= History of linguistic prescription in English =

Prescription is the formulation of normative rules for language use. This article discusses the history of prescription in English. For a more general discussion, see linguistic prescription.

== Origins ==
Languages, especially standard varieties or official languages used in courts of law, for administration of government, and for the promulgation of official works, tend to acquire formally regulated norms over time. Once English became the language of administration of law in England, a form of late Middle English called chancery English became such a standard. When William Caxton introduced printing with movable type into England, the norms of his grammar and spelling were taken largely from chancery English.

However, the "correction" of English grammar was not a large subject of formal study until the 18th century. Poet John Dryden remarked that the grammar in use in his day (second half of the 1600s) was an improvement over the usage of William Shakespeare. Dryden was himself the first to promulgate the rule that a sentence must not end with a preposition. Samuel Johnson's 1755 dictionary contributed to the standardization of English spelling. More influentially, the first of a long line of prescriptionist usage commentators, Robert Lowth, published A Short Introduction to English Grammar in 1762. Lowth's grammar is the source of many of the prescriptive shibboleths that are studied in schools and was the first of a long line of usage commentators to judge the language in addition to describing it. For example, the following footnote from his grammar is, in turn, descriptive and prescriptive: "Whose is by some authors made the Possessive Case of which, and applied to things as well as persons; I think, improperly."

Lowth's method included criticising "false syntax"; his examples of false syntax were culled from Shakespeare, the King James Bible, John Donne, John Milton, Jonathan Swift, Alexander Pope, and other famous writers. A number of his judgments were reinforced by analogies to Latin grammar, though it was his stated principle that such an analogy should not in itself be the basis for English prescriptions. Thus for example he criticises Addison's sentence "Who should I meet the other night, but my old friend?" on the grounds that the thing acted upon should be in the "Objective Case", corresponding, as he says earlier, to an accusative in Latin. (Descriptive critics, on the other hand, would take this example and others as evidence from noted writers that "who" can refer to direct objects in English.) Lowth's ipse dixits appealed to those who wished for certainty and authority in their language. Lowth's grammar was not written for children; nonetheless, within a decade of its appearance, versions of it were adapted for schools, and Lowth's stylistic opinions acquired the force of law in the classroom.

== Wider dissemination ==
During the 19th century, with the rise of popular journalism, the common usage of a tightly knit educated and governing class was extended to a more widely literate public than before or since, through the usage of editors of newspapers and magazines. A broader market for usage guides therefore developed. In general, these attempted to elucidate the distinctions between different words and constructions, promoting some and condemning others as unclear, declassé, or simply wrong. Perhaps the best-known and most historically important text of this sort was Henry Watson Fowler's idiosyncratic and much praised Dictionary of Modern English Usage. Originally published in 1926, it was extensively revised for the 1996 third edition, and remains a primary reference for many educated speakers and editors. Besides Fowler, other writers in this tradition include the 19th-century poet and editor William Cullen Bryant, and, in the 20th-century, Theodore Bernstein and William Safire.

Contemporary stylebooks such as the Associated Press Stylebook, from the Associated Press in the United States, or The Times Style and Usage Guide, from The Times in the United Kingdom, are prescriptive in intent, for use by editors of their respective publications to standardise presentation.

== Criticism ==
During the second half of the 20th century, the prescriptivist tradition of usage commentators started to fall under increasing criticism. Thus, works such as the Merriam-Webster's Dictionary of English Usage, appearing in 1993, attempt to describe usage issues of words and syntax as they are actually used by writers of note, rather than to judge them by standards derived from logic, fine distinctions, or Latin grammar.

== Topics in English usage prescription ==
- ain't
- null comparative
- comparison of absolute adjectives
- double negative
- History of English grammars
- preposition
- serial comma
- singular they
- split infinitive
- superlative of two
- y'all
