= Spelling =

Set of conventions to represent words in writing

Spelling is a set of conventions for written language regarding how graphemes should correspond to the sounds of spoken language. Spelling is one of the elements of orthography, and is a subject of linguistic prescription.

Spellings originated as transcriptions of the sounds of speech according to the alphabetic principle. Fully phonemic orthography is usually only approximated, due to factors including changes in pronunciation over time, and the borrowing of vocabulary from other languages without adapting its spelling. Homophones may be spelled differently on purpose in order to disambiguate words that would otherwise have identical spellings.

== Standards and conventions ==
Standardization of spelling is connected with the development of writing and the establishment of modern standard dialects. Languages with established orthography are those languages that enjoy an official status and a degree of institutional support in a country. Therefore, normative spelling is a relatively recent development linked to the compiling of dictionaries (in many languages, special spelling dictionaries, also called orthographic dictionaries, are compiled, showing prescribed spelling of words but not their meanings), the founding of national academies and other institutions of language maintenance, including widespread education and literacy, and often does not apply to minority and regional languages.

In countries or regions where there is an authoritative language academy, such as France, the Netherlands, and the German-speaking areas, spelling reforms have occasionally been introduced (not always successfully) so that spelling better matches the changing pronunciation.

Examples are:

- German orthography reform of 1996
- Portuguese spelling reform of 1990
- French rectifications orthographiques of 1990.

There have occasionally been English-language spelling reform proposals, at least since the 16th century, but they have made little impact apart from a few spellings preferred by Noah Webster having contributed to American and British English spelling differences.

== Methodology ==
=== Learning ===
Learning proper spelling by rote is a traditional element of elementary education, and divergence from standard spelling is often perceived as an indicator of low intelligence, illiteracy, or lower class standing.

Spelling tests are commonly used to assess a student's mastery of the words in the spelling lessons the student has received so far. They can also be an effective practice method. Spelling bees are competitions to determine the best speller of a group. Prominent spelling bees are sometimes even televised, such as the National Spelling Bee in the United States.

=== Deliberate alteration ===
Divergent spelling is a popular advertising technique, used to attract attention or to render a trademark "suggestive" rather than "merely descriptive", or to evade copyright restrictions. The pastry chains Dunkin' Donuts and Krispy Kreme, for example, employ non-standard spellings.

=== Misspellings ===
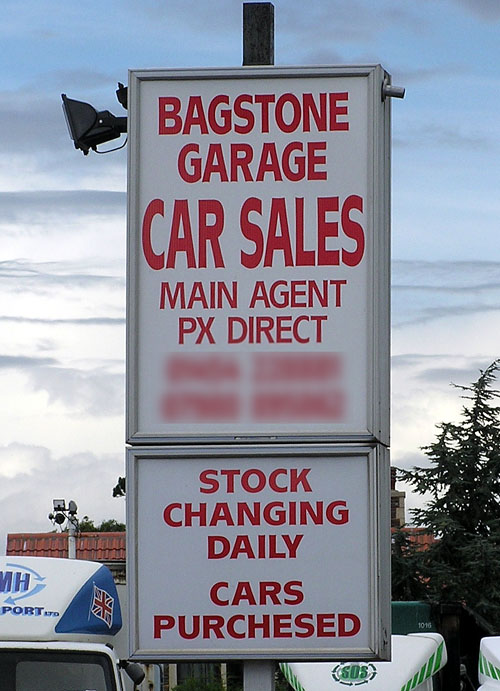
A gas station sign with the word "purchased" misspelled as "purchesed"

While some words admit multiple spellings, some spellings are not considered standard. These are commonly called "misspellings". A misspelled word can be a series of letters that represents no correctly spelled word of the same language at all (such as "leik" for "like") or a correct spelling of another word (such as writing "here" when one means "hear", or "no" when one means "know"). Misspellings of the latter type are called "atomic typos", and they can easily make their way into printed material because they are not caught by simple computer spell checkers. Deliberate misspellings that emphasize the pronunciation of a regional dialect are part of eye dialect (such as writing "'Murica" instead of "America", or "helluva" instead of "hell of a").

Misspellings may be due to accidental typing errors (e.g. the transposition error teh for the), lack of knowledge of the normative spelling, or lack of concern over spelling rules at all. Whether or not a word is misspelled may depend on context and the orthographic conventions adopted, as is the case with American/British English distinctions. Misspelling can also be a matter of opinion when variant spellings are accepted by some and not by others. For example, "miniscule" (for "minuscule") is a misspelling to many, and yet it is listed as an acceptable variant in some dictionaries.

A well-known internet scam involves the registration of domain names that are deliberate misspellings of well-known corporate names to mislead or defraud. The practice is commonly known as "typosquatting".

=== Notable English misspellings in history ===
- Arab, Alabama – This town in north Alabama was named Arad, after its founder, Arad Thompson, but the name was misspelled on a US Post Office map as "Arab", and the misspelled name stuck.
- Google – accidental misspelling of googol (which is the written form of 10^100). According to Google's vice president, as quoted on a BBC The Money Programme documentary, January 2006, the founders – noted for their poor spelling – registered Google as a trademark and web address before someone pointed out that it was not correct.
- Grampian Mountains, Scotland: the name arose from a medieval manuscript copyist's error in copying Mons Graupius in Tacitus' Agricola.
- Ovaltine, a popular bedtime drink in the UK and Australia, came about because someone misspelled the original name Ovomaltine on the trademark documentation.
- Referer – common misspelling of the word referrer. It is so common that it made it into the official specification of HTTP – the communication protocol of the World Wide Web – and has, therefore, become the standard industry spelling when discussing HTTP referers.
- Sequim, Washington – "In 1879 the first post office was built and named 'Seguin' for the surrounding area. [...] In 1907, due to a Postal Official's error in reading an official report, the post office was titled 'Seguim' for approximately a month. With the next report, the Official read the letter 'g' as a 'q', and the post office here became known as 'Sequim.' The name change did not worry the residents enough to protest. It has been known as Sequim ever since."
- According to some, the name of Quartzsite, a mining town in Arizona, was spelled wrongly. It should be Quartzite, after the mineral quartzite.
- Zenith – Arabic zamt was misread; in Latin letters, at the time, the letter i was never dotted, so "m" looked like "ni".

=== English ===
English orthography has a broad degree of standardization. However, there are several ways to spell almost every sound, and most letters have several variants of pronunciation depending on their position in the word and context. Therefore, some spelling mistakes are common even among native speakers. This is mainly due to large number of words that were borrowed from other languages with no successful attempts of complete spelling reform. Most spelling rules usually do not reflect phonetic changes that have taken place since the end of the 15th century (for example, the Great Vowel Shift).

=== Other languages ===
Portuguese spelling is not strictly phonematic. It is associated with an extension of the Portuguese language and the emergence of numerous regional and dialect variants. In 2009 the global reform of the Portuguese language was initiated to eliminate 98% of inconsistencies in spelling between various countries.

The orthography of the Icelandic language is based on the etymological principle, like English; thus the Icelanders themselves experience difficulties in writing. The modern Icelandic alphabet is based on the standard introduced by the Danish philologist Rasmus Rask.

The fundamental principles of the Spanish orthography are phonological and etymological, that is why there are several letters with identical phonemes. Beginning from the 17th century, various options for orthographic reforms were suggested that would create a one-to-one correspondence between grapheme and phoneme, but all of them were rejected. Most modern proposals to reform spelling are limited to the removal of homophone letters that are preserved for etymological reasons.

In many languages, types of misspelling arise from features of those languages which are not present in English: for example,

- In German, the rules for initial capitalisation, the use of ß, and the splitting of words at line breaks,
- In Japanese, the choice between kanji, hiragana and katakana, and the choice of katakana for the many words borrowed from English and other foreign languages,
- In Welsh (and other Celtic languages), errors in the application of the mutation system for initial consonants (camdreigladau).

== See also ==
- Dyslexia
- Eye dialect
- Grapheme
- Official script
- Orthography
- Phonetic spelling
- Pronunciation spelling
- Register (sociolinguistics)
- Spell checker
- Spelling bee
- Spelling pronunciation
- Spelling reform

=== English spelling ===
- American and British English spelling differences
- English orthography
- English terms with diacritical marks
- English spelling reform
- Pronunciation respelling for English
- Commonly misspelled English words
- Frequently misused words

=== Other languages ===
- List of language orthographies
- French orthography
- German orthography
- Greek orthography
- Hangul orthography
- Italian orthography
- Latin spelling and pronunciation
- Russian orthography
- Spanish orthography
