= Spelling test =

Assessment of word spelling ability

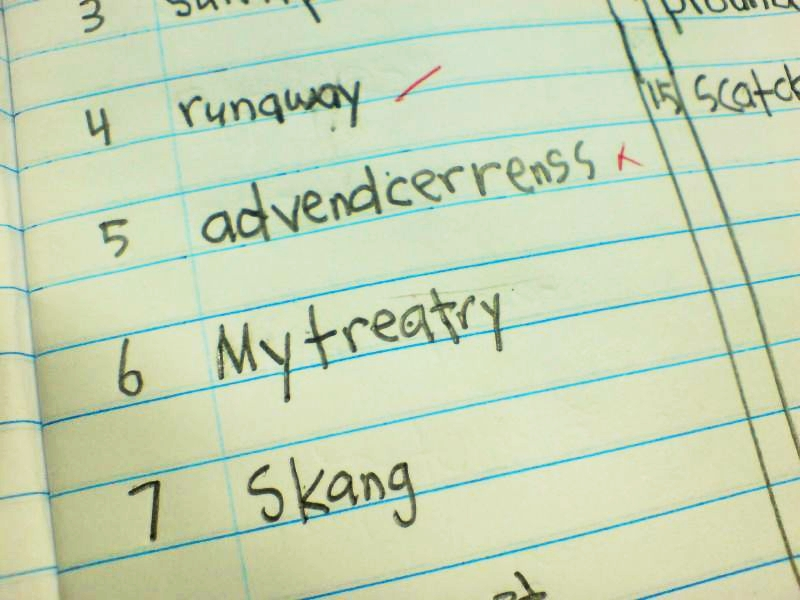
A spelling test for a Year 3 student

A spelling test is an assessment of a person's (usually a student's) ability to spell words correctly. Spelling tests are usually given in school during language arts class, to see how well each student has learned the most recent spelling lesson. Typical intervals for spelling tests are one per week throughout the school year, except for spelling bees, which are generally held once per year. Spelling tests are associated with linguistic prescriptivism, the idea that language should be used in a certain manner as opposed to others.

== Types of spelling tests ==
There are generally four types of spelling tests. In an oral spelling test, the teacher pronounces each word out loud and the students write each word down. In a spelling bee-type test (see spelling bee below), each student is asked individually one-at-a-time to spell a (different) specific word out loud. In a proofreading-style test, sentences or paragraphs are given to the student on one or more sheets of paper, and the student must find the incorrectly spelled words and supply the correct spellings in the spaces provided. In a multiple choice spelling test, two or more spellings are given for each word in the test, and the student must place a mark next to the one that is correct. The main difference between most spelling tests at school and a spelling bee is that in a spelling bee the students do not get to know in advance which words will be tested, but for regular spelling tests they do.

=== Spelling bee ===
One very difficult kind of spelling test is the spelling bee: a competition where contestants, usually children, are asked to spell English words. The practice originated in the United States and has since spread to elsewhere in the English-speaking world, especially North America. It is not, however, a very familiar concept in most Commonwealth nations, where, if the term is known at all, it is usually perceived as a peculiar American tradition. Every year in the United States, there is a national spelling bee involving most primary and secondary schools in the country; in addition to being awarded a scholarship, the winners in each age group get to meet the President of the United States.

== Preparing for a spelling test ==
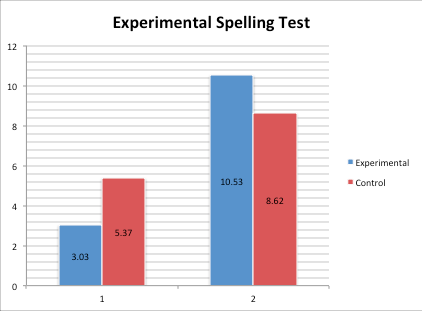
WRAT pre- and post-test results for experimental and control groups

=== Repetition ===
In this method, the student typically writes out each word in the current spelling lesson a set number of times each, for example, 50 to 100 times.

=== Making mnemonics ===
One of the most effective ways to memorize spellings is to make up mnemonics to help remember them. A mnemonic is a memory trick which associates the thing that is to be remembered with something else to make it easier. For spelling, it can be the exaggerated pronunciation of a word, like indepenDENT. Or it might be a silly sentence or visual image to help remember the word, like "the independents all dented their cars with sledgehammers". Or it might describe a key aspect of a word to help remember it, like "all the vowels in cemetery are the same: three little e's, each on its own little tombstone."

== See also ==
- Common European Framework of Reference for Languages
- WRAT
