= Linguistic prescription =

Prescriptive rules of grammar and usage

Linguistic prescription (Note: Also called prescriptivism or prescriptive grammar.) is the establishment of rules defining publicly preferred usage of language, including rules of spelling, pronunciation, vocabulary, and grammar. Linguistic prescriptivism may aim to establish a standard language, teach what a particular society or sector of a society perceives as a correct or proper form, or advise on effective and stylistically apt communication. If usage preferences are conservative, prescription might appear resistant to language change; if radical, it may produce neologisms. Such prescriptions may be motivated by consistency (making a language simpler or more logical); rhetorical effectiveness; tradition; aesthetics or personal preferences; linguistic purism or nationalism (i.e. removing foreign influences); or to avoid causing offense (etiquette or political correctness).

Prescriptive approaches to language are often contrasted with the descriptive approach of academic linguistics, which observes and records how language is actually used (while avoiding passing judgment). The basis of linguistic research is text (corpus) analysis and field study, both of which are descriptive activities. Description may also include researchers' observations of their own language usage. In the Eastern European linguistic tradition, the discipline dealing with standard language cultivation and prescription is known as "language culture" or "speech culture".

Despite being apparent opposites, prescriptive and descriptive approaches have a certain degree of conceptual overlap as comprehensive descriptive accounts must take into account and record existing speaker preferences, and a prior understanding of how language is actually used is necessary for prescription to be effective. Since the mid-20th century some historically prescriptive works - even including style guides, which are prescriptive works by nature - have increasingly integrated descriptive material and approaches. Examples of guides updated to add more descriptive material include Webster's Third New International Dictionary (1961) and the third edition Garner's Modern English Usage (2009) in English, or the Nouveau Petit Robert (1993) in French. A partially descriptive approach can be especially useful when approaching topics of ongoing conflict between authorities, or in different dialects, disciplines, styles, or registers. Other guides, such as The Chicago Manual of Style, are designed to impose a single style and thus remain primarily prescriptive (as of 2017).

Some authors define "prescriptivism" as the concept where a certain language variety is promoted as linguistically superior to others, thus recognizing the standard language ideology as a constitutive element of prescriptivism or even identifying prescriptivism with this system of views. Others, however, use this term in relation to any attempts to recommend or mandate a particular way of language usage (in a specific context or register), without, however, implying that these practices must involve propagating the standard language ideology. According to another understanding, the prescriptive attitude is an approach to norm-formulating and codification that involves imposing arbitrary rulings upon a speech community, as opposed to more liberal approaches that draw heavily from descriptive surveys; in a wider sense, however, the latter also constitute a form of prescriptivism.

Mate Kapović makes a distinction between "prescription" and "prescriptivism", defining the former as "a process of codification of a certain variety of language for some sort of official use", and the latter as "an unscientific tendency to mystify linguistic prescription".

== Aims ==
Linguistic prescription is a part of a language standardization process. The chief aim of linguistic prescription is to specify socially preferred language forms (either generally, as in Standard English, or in style and register) in a way that is easily taught and learned. Prescription may apply to most aspects of language, including spelling, pronunciation, vocabulary, morphology, syntax, and semantics.

Prescription is useful for facilitating inter-regional communication, allowing speakers of divergent dialects to understand a standardized idiom used in broadcasting, for example, more readily than each other's dialects. While such a lingua franca may evolve by itself, the tendency to formally codify and normalize it is widespread in most parts of the world. Foreign language instruction is also considered a form of prescription, since it involves instructing learners how to speak, based on usage documentation laid down by others.

Linguistic prescription may also be used to advance a social or political ideology. Throughout history, prescription has been created around high-class language, and therefore it degeneralizes lower-class language. This has led to many justifications of classism, as the lower-class can easily be portrayed to be incoherent and improper if they do not speak the standard language. This also corresponds to the use of prescription for racism, as dialects spoken by what is seen as the superior race are usually standardized in countries with prominent racism. A good example of this is the demeaning of AAVE in the United States, as the idea that the "lower race" speaks improperly is propagated by people with an opposing ideology.

== Authority ==
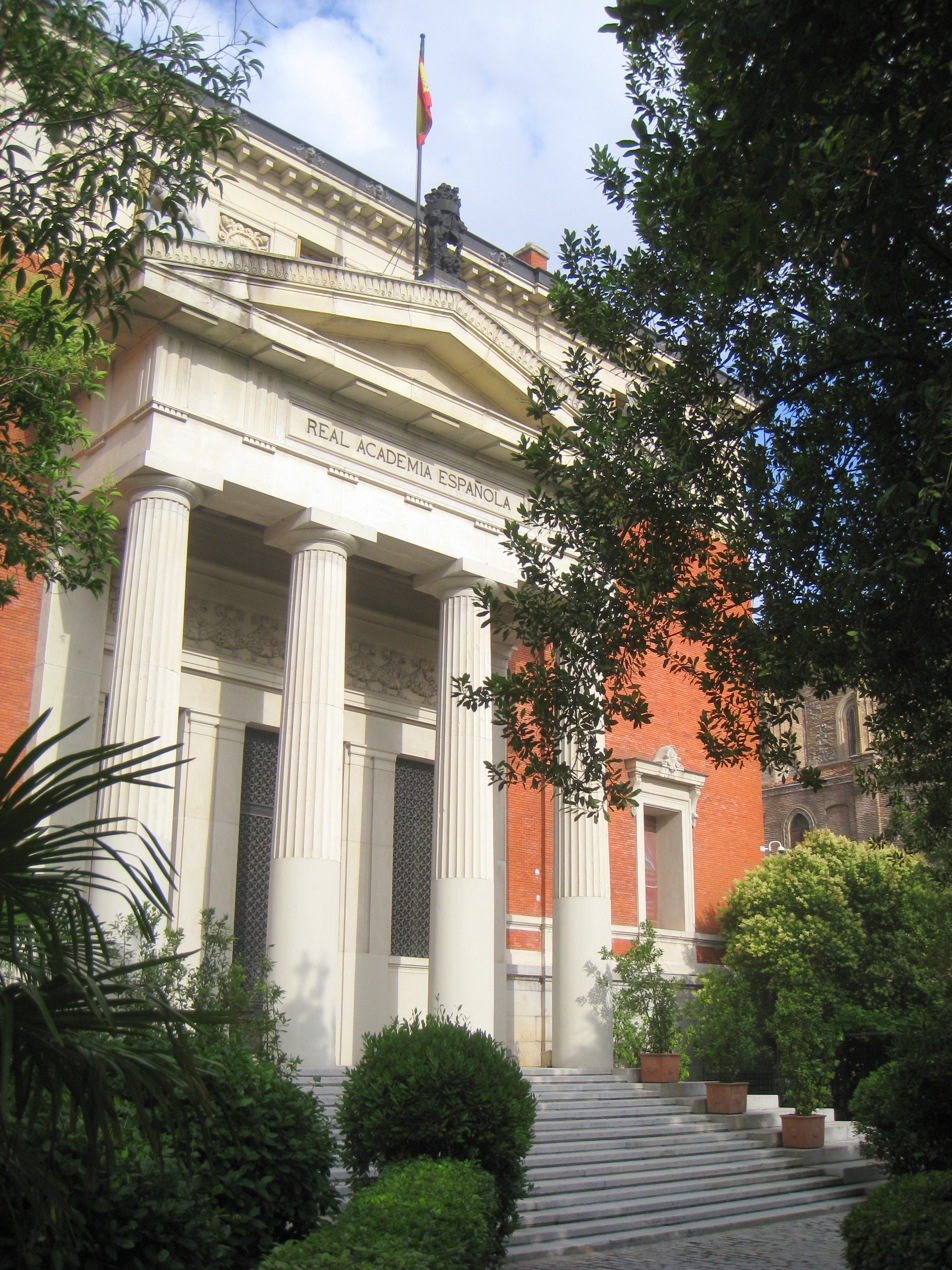
The Royal Spanish Academy, Madrid

Prescription presupposes authorities whose judgments may come to be followed by many other speakers and writers. For English, these authorities tend to be books. H. W. Fowler's Modern English Usage was widely taken as an authority for British English for much of the 20th century; Strunk and White's The Elements of Style has done similarly for American English. The Duden grammar (first edition 1880) has a similar status for German.

=== Dictionaries ===
Although lexicographers often see their work as purely descriptive, dictionaries are widely regarded as prescriptive authorities. They are invoked in everyday conversations and word-based game shows as authorities on how words are supposed to be used, and speakers frequently appeal to earlier senses or etymologies of words to argue for what a word "really" means. Bourdieu characterises dictionaries as providing a "normalized" language.

In practice, however, major dictionaries tend to operate descriptively. Both Merriam-Webster and the Oxford English Dictionary (OED) regularly publish new entries or update existing definitions based on observed usage, adding a word once its frequency passes a threshold rather than attempting to create or sanction new vocabulary. Both also contextualise definitions with real-life usage examples, with Merriam-Webster drawing on notably current sources. The OED's own description of itself as "the accepted authority on the English language" illustrates the tension: the phrase invites readers to treat the dictionary as prescriptive, even though the dictionary's methodology is largely descriptive.

Some dictionaries lower the degree of normalisation further by mapping regional variation. The Dictionary of American Regional English (DARE), for example, aims at "representing the full panoply of American regional vocabulary," cataloguing which senses are part of the shared norms of which communities rather than declaring a single standard.

Books such as Lynne Truss's Eats, Shoots & Leaves (2003), which argues for stricter adherence to prescriptive punctuation rules, also seek to exert an influence.

=== Formal regulation ===
Linguistic prescription is imposed by regulation in some places. The French Academy in Paris is the national body in France whose recommendations about the French language are often followed in the French-speaking world (francophonie), though not legally enforceable. In Germany and the Netherlands, recent spelling and punctuation reforms, such as the German orthographic reform of 1996, were devised by teams of linguists commissioned by the respective governments and then implemented by statutes, some met with widespread dissent.

Examples of national prescriptive bodies and initiatives are:

- Afrikaans: The Taalkommissie (Language Commission) is responsible for the compilation of the Afrikaanse Woordelys en Spelreëls (Afrikaans Word-list and Spelling Rules), an orthography of formal, standardized Afrikaans.
- Albanian: The Social Sciences and Albanological Section of the Academy of Sciences of Albania for the Tosk variety of the Albanian standard language.
- Canadian French: The Office québécois de la langue française in the Canadian province of Québec, where French is perceived to be particularly threatened by the incursion of English.
- Dutch: In the Netherlands and the Flanders region of Belgium, standardized spelling norms are compulsory for government publications and in education (see Wordlist of the Dutch language). The Flemish press and other media also adhere to these rules. In the Netherlands, some media apply a slightly adapted spelling, as outlined in the White Booklet.
- French: The recommendations of the Académie française, a national body, are legally unenforceable, but they are often followed by standard French speakers.
- German: The German orthography reform of 1996 established statutory national normative spelling usages for each of the German-speaking countries (Germany, Austria, Liechtenstein, Switzerland, and Belgium). It has been disregarded by many people, and it became so controversial in the state of Schleswig-Holstein that in a plebiscite held there in 1998 56.4% of voters opposed its implementation. Notwithstanding, the Schleswig-Holstein parliament reversed the referendum outcome in 1999. Many major German newspapers chose to implement the reforms only partially (e.g. Axel Springer AG, Der Spiegel) or to reject it entirely, ending a period when combined German spelling, although officially only necessary in government and educational use, was the widespread de facto standard.
- Italian: The Accademia della Crusca, the Italian language academic body.
- Polish: The Polish Language Council for standard Polish, which aims to popularize Polish language knowledge, provide guidance on standard usage, as well as formulate the rules of orthography. The Polish prescriptive policy recognizes two subvarieties of standard Polish: the "model/official norm" (Polish: norma wzorcowa) and the "colloquial/vernacular norm" (Polish: norma użytkowa), with the former being a highly traditionalistic idiom for written language and public usage, and the latter being a more liberal idiom for private contexts that is more permissive for loanwords and deviations from "traditional" usage. The latter is also considered to include certain "educated" regional forms, known as regionalizmy. The term "standard Polish" is not much used in Poland; instead, the name polszczyzna ogólna ("General [Common] Polish") is preferred, with the codified standard dialect being prescribed as "correct Polish".
- Portuguese: The Portuguese Language Orthographic Agreement of 1990 sets a standard orthography for the language, it has been made into law in both Brazil (2009) and Portugal (2008).
- Romanian: The Romanian Academy for standard Romanian, whose interpretations and instructions are approved by the Romanian state and other substances where Romanian is authoritatively recognized (e.g. the European Union and Vojvodina). In Moldova, the only country besides Romania where Romanian is the state language, it is monitored by the Institute of Linguistics of Academy of Sciences of Moldova.
- Russian: In 1783, the Russian Academy was founded; in 1841, it merged to the Russian Academy of Sciences and became its Department of the Russian Language and Literature, which existed until 1927. Later, two authoritative prescriptive Russian dictionaries were written by Dmitry Ushakov et al. (Explanatory Dictionary of the Russian Language, 1935–1940) and Sergei Ozhegov (Dictionary of the Russian Language, 1949). In 1952, a department of speech culture was formed at the Institute of Linguistics of the USSR Academy of Sciences; since 1958, Russian language norms have been regulated by the V.V. Vinogradov Russian Language Institute of the Russian Academy of Sciences.
- Spanish: The Real Academia Española in affiliation with the Association of Spanish Language Academies for standard Spanish in 21 countries.
- Turkish: The Turkish Language Association, founded in 1932 by Atatürk, regulates the Turkish language.

=== Style manuals ===
Other kinds of authorities exist in specific settings, most commonly in the form of style guidebooks (also called style guides, manuals of style, style books, or style sheets). Style guides vary in form, and may be alphabetical usage dictionaries, comprehensive manuals divided into numerous subsection by the facet of language, or very compact works insistent upon only a few matters of particular importance to the publisher. Some aim to be comprehensive only for a specific field, deferring to more general-audience guides on matters that are not particular to the discipline in question. There are different types of style guides, by purpose and audience. Because the genres of writing and the audiences of each manual are different, style manuals often conflict with each other, even within the same vernacular of English.

Many publishers have established an internal house style specifying preferred spellings and grammatical forms, such as serial commas, how to write acronyms, and various awkward expressions to avoid. Most of these are internal documentation for the publisher's staff, though various newspapers, universities, and other organizations have made theirs available for public inspection, and sometimes even sell them as books, e.g. The New York Times Manual of Style and Usage and The Economist Style Guide.

In a few cases, an entire publishing sector complies with a publication that originated as a house style manual, such as The Chicago Manual of Style and New Hart's Rules in non-fiction book publishing in the United States and the United Kingdom, respectively, and The Associated Press Stylebook in American news style. Others are by self-appointed advocates whose rules are propagated in the popular press, as in "proper Cantonese pronunciation". The aforementioned Fowler, and Strunk & White, were among the self-appointed, as are some modern authors of style works, like Bryan A. Garner and his Modern English Usage (formerly Modern American Usage).

Various style guides are used for academic papers and professional journals and have become de facto standards in particular fields, though the bulk of their material pertains to formatting of source citations (in mutually conflicting ways). Some examples are those issued by the American Medical Association, the Modern Language Association, and the Modern Humanities Research Association; there are many others. Scientific Style and Format, by the Council of Science Editors, seeks to normalize style in scientific journal publishing, based where possible on standards issued by bodies like the International Standards Organization.

None of these works have any sort of legal or regulatory authority (though some governments produce their own house style books for internal use). They still have authority in the sense that a student may be marked down for failure to follow a specified style manual; a professional publisher may enforce compliance; a publication may require its employees to use house style as a matter of on-the-job competence. A well-respected style guide, and usually one intended for a general audience, may also have the kind of authority that a dictionary does consult as a reference work to satisfy personal curiosity or settle an argument.

== Origins ==
Historically, linguistic prescriptivism originates in a standard language when a society establishes social stratification and a socio-economic hierarchy. The spoken and written language usages of the authorities (state, military, church) is preserved as the standard language. Departures from this standard language may jeopardize social success (see social class). Sometimes, archaisms and honorific stylizations may be deliberately introduced or preserved to distinguish the prestige form of the language from contemporary colloquial language. Likewise, the style of language used in ritual also differs from everyday speech. Special ceremonial languages known only to a select few spiritual leaders are found throughout the world; Liturgical Latin has served a similar function for centuries.

Traditional and simplified Chinese characters

When a culture develops a writing system, orthographic rules for the consistent transcription of culturally important transactions (such as laws, scriptures, contracts, or poetry) allow a large number of discussants to understand written conversations easily, and across multiple generations.

Early historical trends in literacy and alphabetization were closely tied to the influence of various religious institutions. Western Christianity propagated the Latin alphabet. Eastern Orthodoxy spread the Greek and Cyrillic alphabets. Judaism used the Hebrew alphabet, and Islam the Arabic script. Hinduism used the Devanagari script. In certain traditions, strict adherence to prescribed spellings and pronunciations was and remains of great spiritual importance. Islamic naming conventions and greetings are notable examples of the linguistic prescription being a prerequisite to spiritual righteousness. Another commonly cited example of prescriptive language usage closely associated with social propriety is the system of Japanese honorific speech.

Most, if not all, widely spoken languages demonstrate some degree of social codification in how they conform to prescriptive rules. Linguistic prestige is a central research topic within sociolinguistics. Notions of linguistic prestige apply to different dialects of the same language and also to separate, distinct languages in multilingual regions. Prestige level disparity often leads to diglossia: speakers in certain social contexts consciously choose a prestige language or dialect over a less prestigious one, even if it is their native tongue.

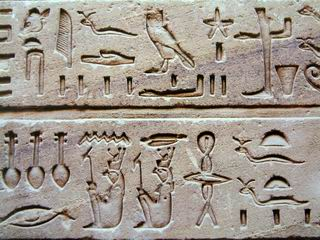
Ptolemaic hieroglyphics from the Temple of Kom Ombo

Government bureaucracy tends toward prescriptivism as a means of enforcing functional continuity. Such prescriptivism dates from ancient Egypt, where bureaucrats preserved the spelling of the Middle Kingdom of Egypt into the Ptolemaic period through the standard usage of Egyptian hieroglyphics.

== Sources ==
From the earliest attempts at prescription in classical times grammarians have based their norms on observed prestige use of language. Modern prescriptivist textbooks draw heavily on descriptive linguistic analysis.

The prescription may privilege some existing forms over others for the sake of maximizing clarity and precision in language use. Others are subjective judgments of what constitutes good taste. Some reflect the promotion of one class or region within a language community over another, which can become politically controversial.

Prescription can also reflect ethical considerations, as in prohibiting swear words. Words referring to elements of sexuality or toilet hygiene may be regarded as obscene. Blasphemies against religion may be forbidden. In the 21st century, political correctness objects to the use of words perceived as offensive.

Some elements of prescription in English are sometimes thought to have been based on the norms of Latin grammar. Robert Lowth is frequently cited as having done so, but he specifically objected to "forcing the English under the rules of a foreign Language".

== Criticisms ==
Prescriptivism is often subject to criticism. Many linguists, such as Geoffrey Pullum and other posters to Language Log, are skeptical of the quality of advice given in many usage guides, including highly regarded books like Strunk and White's The Elements of Style. Linguists point out that popular books on English usage written by journalists or novelists (e.g. Simon Heffer's Strictly English: The Correct Way to Write ... and Why It Matters) often make basic errors in linguistic analysis.

A frequent criticism is that prescription has a tendency to favor the language of one particular area or social class over others, and thus militates against linguistic diversity. Frequently, a standard dialect is associated with the upper class, for example the United Kingdom's Received Pronunciation (RP). RP has now lost much of its status as the Anglophone standard, and other standards are now alternative systems for English as a foreign language. Although these have a more democratic base, they still exclude the vast majority of the English-speaking world: speakers of Scottish English, Hiberno-English, Appalachian English, Australian English, Indian English, Nigerian English or African-American English may feel the standard is arbitrarily selected or slanted against them. Therefore, prescription has political consequences; indeed, it can be—and has been—used consciously as a political tool.

A second issue with prescriptivism is that it tends to explicitly devalue non-standard dialects. It has been argued that prescription, apart from formulating standard language norms, often attempts to influence speakers to apply the proposed linguistic devices invariably, without considering the existence of different varieties and registers of language. While some linguists approve the practical role of language standardization in modern nation states, certain models of prescriptive codification have been criticized for going far beyond mere norm-setting, i.e. by promoting the sanctioned language variety as the only legitimate means of communication and presenting it as the only valid baseline of correctness, while stigmatizing non-standard usages as "mistakes". Such practices have been said to contribute to perpetuating the belief that non-codified forms of language are innately inferior, creating social stigma and discrimination toward their speakers. In contrast, modern linguists would generally hold that all forms of language, including both vernacular dialects and different realizations of a standardized variety, are scientifically equal as instruments of communication, even if deemed socially inappropriate for certain situational contexts. Resulting in standard language ideology, normative practices might also give rise to the conviction that explicit formal instruction is an essential prerequisite for acquiring proper command of one's native language, thus creating a massive feeling of linguistic insecurity. Propagating such language attitudes is characteristic of the prescriptivists in Eastern Europe, where normativist ideas of correctness can be found even among professional linguists.

Another serious issue with prescription is that prescriptive rules quickly become entrenched and it is difficult to change them when the language changes. Thus, there is a tendency for prescription to lag behind the vernacular language. In 1834, an anonymous writer advised against the split infinitive, reasoning that the construction was not a frequent feature of English as he knew it. Today the construction is in everyday use and generally considered standard usage, yet the old prohibition can still be heard.

A further problem is a challenge of specifying understandable criteria. Although prescribing authorizations may have clear ideas about why they make a particular choice, and their choices are seldom entirely arbitrary, there exists no linguistically sustainable metric for ascertaining which forms of language should be considered standard or otherwise preferable. Judgments that seek to resolve ambiguity or increase the ability of the language to make subtle distinctions are easier to defend. Judgments based on the subjective associations of a word are more problematic.

Finally, there is the problem of inappropriate dogmatism. Although competent authorities tend to make careful statements, popular pronouncements on language are apt to condemn. Thus, wise prescriptive advice identifying a form as colloquial or non-standard and suggesting that it be used with caution in some contexts may – when taken up in the classroom – become converted into a ruling that the dispreferred form is automatically unacceptable in all circumstances, a view academic linguists reject. (Linguists may accept that a construction is ungrammatical or incorrect in relation to a certain lect if it does not conform to its inherent rules, but they would not consider it absolutely wrong simply because it diverges from the norms of a prestige variety.) A classic example from 18th-century England is Robert Lowth's tentative suggestion that preposition stranding in relative clauses sounds colloquial. This blossomed into a grammatical rule that a sentence should never end with a preposition.

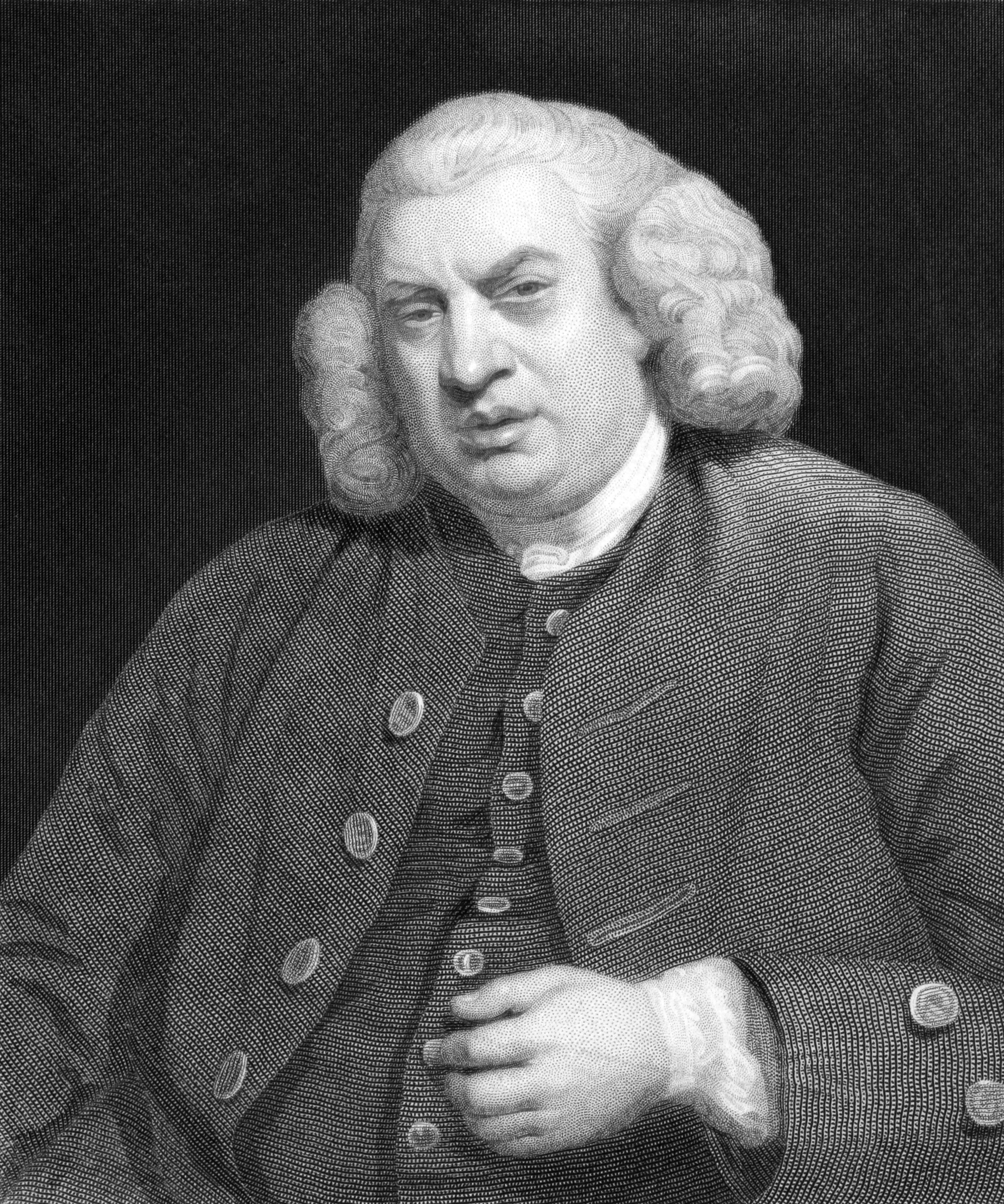
Samuel Johnson, c. 1772

For these reasons, some writers argue that linguistic prescription is foolish or futile. Samuel Johnson commented on the tendency of some prescription to resist language change:

When we see men grow old and die at a certain time one after another, from century to century, we laugh at the elixir that promises to prolong life to a thousand years; and with equal justice may the lexicographer be derided, who is able to produce no example of a nation that has preserved their words and phrases from mutability, shall imagine that his dictionary can embalm his language, and secure it from corruption and decay, that it is in his power to change sublunary nature, and clear the world at once from folly, vanity, and affectation. With this hope, however, academies have been instituted, to guard the avenues of their languages, to retain fugitives, and repulse intruders; but their vigilance and activity have hitherto been vain; sounds remain too volatile and subtle for legal restraints; to enchain syllables, and to lash the wind, are equally the undertakings of pride, unwilling to measure its desires by its strength. The French language has visibly changed under the inspection of the academy; the stile of Amelot's translation of Father Paul is witnessed, by Pierre François le Courayer to be un peu passé; and no Italian will maintain that the diction of any modern writer is not perceptibly different from that of Boccace, Machiavel, or Caro.

— Preface to a Dictionary of the English Language at Project Gutenberg

== See also ==
- Constructionism (learning theory) – Learning theory involving the construction of mental models
- Skunked term – Word avoided due to problematic meanings
- History of English grammars
- History of linguistic prescription in English
- Hypercorrection – Non-standard language usage
- Language policy – Body of practices intended to cause a desired change in language
- Linguistic insecurity – Lack of confidence about one's way of speaking
- Linguistic purism – Preferring a language variety as purer
- Politics and the English Language – 1946 essay by George Orwell
- Traditional grammar – Framework for the description of the structure of a language
- Error (linguistics) – Unintended deviation from the rules of a language variety
- Schizoglossia – Linguistic insecurity about one's native language
- Barbarism (linguistics) – Linguistic deviation
- Solecism – Phrase that transgresses the rules of grammar
- Legalese – English as used in legal matters
- Psychobabble – Form of speech or writing that uses psychological jargon in a misleading way
- Technobabble – Jargon-sounding nonsense
- Plain English – Simple terms in the English language

== Examples of prescriptivist topics ==
- Common English usage misconceptions – Beliefs about the use of the English language considered by others as wrong
- Fowler's Modern English Usage – Style guide by Henry Watson Fowler
- List of Germanic and Latinate equivalents in English
- List of English words with disputed usage
- Wikipedia:List of commonly misused English words
- Pleonasm – Redundancy in linguistic expression
- Rectification of Names – Confucian political concept

== Sources ==
- McArthur, Tom, ed. (1992). The Oxford Companion to the English Language. Oxford University Press. ISBN 978-0-19-214183-5.
- Heinz, Michaela (2003). "Les locutions figurées dans le Nouveau Petit Robert: évolution de quelques traitements entre 1993 et 2003". Les dictionnaires Le Robert: Genèse et évolution. pp. 227–245. doi:10.4000/books.pum.13867. ISBN 9782760619425.
- Strunk and White's The Elements of Style
