= Codification (linguistics) =

Normalisation of a language's variations

In linguistics, codification is the social process of a language's natural variation being reduced and features becoming more fixed or subject to prescriptive rules. Codification is a precursor to standardization: the development of a standard variety of a language.

Codifying a language can vary from case to case and depends on the stage of standardization that might have already occurred naturally. It typically means to develop a writing system, set up normative rules for grammar, orthography, pronunciation, and usage of vocabulary as well as publish grammar books, dictionaries and similar guidelines. In cases where several variants exist for a specific aspect, e.g. different ways of spelling a word, decisions on which variant is going to be the standard one have to be made.

In some countries such codification is done by a body constituted by the state, such as the Académie française. Codification often happens due to new inventions, changes in values or other cultural influences. After the process of decolonialization, many African states had to decide whether they wanted to keep the colonial language or chose one (or more) of their indigenous language varieties as official languages, which made language planning necessary.

In a well-known model of language planning by Einar Haugen, codification is only the second step. Step one is the selection process, step three is the implementation of the changes in society and step four is the elaboration of vocabulary (especially technical terms). In the process of language planning, two major levels exist: corpus planning and status planning (Heinz Kloss). Codification is part of the corpus planning of a language, because the "body" of the language itself is being planned as opposed to status planning, where the prestige and usage of a language is enhanced:

- Corpus planning: Codification of a language (step 2); elaborating its functions to meet language needs (step 4)
- Status planning: Selection of a language (step 1); implementing its functions by spreading it (step 3)

Whether the codification is successful depends heavily on its acceptance by the population as well as its form of implementation by the government, e.g. promoting its prestige and spread, teaching the codified norm in school and language courses, and so on.

== See also ==
- Official language
- Code
- Character encoding
- Language planning
- List of language regulators
- Usage
- Usus
