= Merriam-Webster's Dictionary of English Usage =

United States English usage dictionary

Merriam-Webster's Dictionary of English Usage (MWDEU) is a usage dictionary published by Merriam-Webster, Inc., of Springfield, Massachusetts. It is currently available in a reprint edition (1994) ISBN 0-87779-132-5 or ISBN 978-0-87779-132-4. (The 1989 edition did not include Merriam- in the title. It was added as part of the rebranding campaign to emphasize the differences between Merriam-Webster's dictionaries and dictionaries of other publishers using the generic trademark Webster's.)

The book has been praised by language experts. Stan Carey at the blog Sentence First concludes that it operates "in such a thorough and unbiased way is what elevates MWDEU so far above the ordinary. Each entry is presented in a much broader context than is typically the case in books that advise on English usage and style." It is critically acclaimed by the linguist Geoffrey Pullum, who calls it "the best usage book I know of... utterly wonderful." The Economist included it in its list "What to read to become a better writer," stating, "What distinguishes MWDEU is its relentless empiricism." It is known for its historical scholarship, analysis, use of examples, and descriptive approach. It has more than 2,300 entries, and includes more than 20,000 quotations from prominent writers.

A concise version is also available.

== See also ==
- A Dictionary of Modern English Usage
- The Cambridge Guide to English Usage
- Garner's Modern American Usage
- List of English words with disputed usage
