= Haplology =

Elision through dissimilation

Haplology (from Greek ἁπλόος haplóos "simple" and λόγος lógos, "speech") is, in spoken language, the elision (elimination or deletion) of an entire syllable or a part of it through dissimilation (a differentiating shift that affects two neighboring similar sounds). The phenomenon was identified by American philologist Maurice Bloomfield in the 20th century. Linguists sometimes jokingly refer to the phenomenon as "haplogy", an autology. As a general rule, haplology occurs in English adverbs of adjectives ending in "le", for example gentlely → gently; ablely → ably.

== Examples ==
- Basque: sagarrardo → sagardo ('apple cider')
- German: Zaubererin → Zauberin (female 'wizard' or 'magician'; male: der Zauberer; female ending -in); this is a productive pattern applied to other words ending in (spelt) -erer.
- Dutch: narcissisme → narcisme ('narcissism')
- French: fémininité → féminité ('femininity')
- English:
  - Old English Engla land → Engle lond → England (expected form would be *Engelland)
  - Old English cyning → English king (expected form would be *kinning)
  - morphophonology → morphonology
  - conservativism → conservatism
  - femininism → feminism
  - mononomial → monomial
  - urine analysis → urinalysis
  - Colloquial (non-standard and eye dialect spellings signalled by #):
    - library (RP: /ˈlaɪbrəri/) → #libry /ˈlaɪbri/
    - particularly → #particuly
    - probably → #probly
    - February → #Febury, #Febuary or #Febr(u)y (compare e.g. Austrian German Feber)
    - representative → #representive
    - authoritative → #authoritive
    - deteriorate → #deteriate
- Latin:
  - nutritrix → nutrix ('nurse')
  - idololatria → idolatria (hence idolatry)
- Biological Latin:
  - Hamamelididae (disallowed spelling: Hamamelidae)
  - Nycterididae → Nycteridae
  - Anomalocarididae (disallowed spelling: Anomalocaridae)
- Homeric Greek:
  - amphiphoreus (ἀμφιφορεύς) → amphoreus (ἀμφορεύς) ('two-handled pitcher, amphora')
  - kelainonéphēs (κελαινονέφης) → kelainéphēs (κελαινέφης) ('black with clouds')
- Arabic:
  - tataqātalūna (تَتَقَاتَلُونَ) → taqātalūna (تَقَاتَلُونَ) ('you are fighting each other')
  - * ʾaʾkulu (*أَأْكُلُ) → ʾākulu (آكُلُ) ('I eat')
- Spanish: impudicicia → impudicia ('lack of modesty', i.e. the nominal form of impúdico, 'immodest')
- Portuguese:
  - idadoso → idoso (aged person, senior)
  - femininismo → feminismo (feminism)
  - Colloquially in sequences like campo pequeno pronounced like "campequeno" or faculdade de letras pronounced like "faculdadletras".
- Italian:
  - tragico-comico → tragicomico ('tragicomic')
  - domani mattina → domattina ('tomorrow morning')

== Reduplication ==
The reverse process is known as reduplication, the doubling of phonological material.

== See also ==
- Haplography
- Dissimilation
- Portmanteau
