= List of commonly misused English words =

This is a list of English words that are thought to be commonly misused. It is meant to include only words whose misuse is deprecated by most usage writers, editors, and professional grammarians defining the norms of Standard English. It is possible that some of the meanings marked non-standard may pass into Standard English in the future, but at this time all of the following non-standard phrases are likely to be marked as incorrect by English teachers or changed by editors if used in a work submitted for publication, where adherence to the conventions of Standard English is normally expected. Some examples are homonyms, or pairs of words that are spelled similarly and often confused.

The words listed below are often used in ways that major English dictionaries do not approve of. See List of English words with disputed usage for words that are used in ways that are deprecated by some usage writers but are condoned by some dictionaries. There may be regional variations in grammar, orthography, and word-use, especially between different English-speaking countries. Such differences are not classified normatively as non-standard or "incorrect" once they have gained widespread acceptance in a particular country.

== List ==
=== A ===
- a lot and allot. A lot means "many" or "much"; allot means to distribute something.
- abdicate, abnegate, abrogate, and arrogate. To abdicate is to resign from the throne, or more loosely to cast off a responsibility. To abnegate is to deny oneself something. To abrogate is to repeal (do away with) a law or abolish (put an end to) an arrangement, also to evade a responsibility. To arrogate is to attempt to take on a right or responsibility to which one is not entitled.
  - Standard: Edward VIII abdicated the throne of the United Kingdom.
  - Standard: Henry VIII abrogated Welsh customary law.
  - Non-standard: You should not abrogate to yourself the whole honour of the President's visit (should be "arrogate").
- accept and except. While they sound similar (or even identical in parts of the US), except is a preposition that means "apart from", while accept is a verb that means "agree with", "take in", or "receive". Except is also occasionally used as a verb, meaning to take out or to leave out.
  - Standard: We accept all major credit cards, except Diners Club.
  - Standard: People are fools... present company excepted! (meaning "present company excluded")
  - Non-standard: I had trouble making friends with them; I never felt excepted.
  - Non-standard: We all went swimming, accept for Jack.
- acute and chronic. Acute means "sharp", as an acute illness is one that rapidly worsens and reaches a crisis. A chronic illness may also be a severe one, but it is long-lasting, lingering, or having a long history.
  - Standard: She was treated with epinephrine during an acute asthma attack.
  - Standard: It is not a terminal illness, but it does cause chronic pain.
  - Non-standard: I have suffered from acute asthma for twenty years.
  - Non-standard: I just started feeling this chronic pain in my back.
- adverse and averse. Adverse means unfavorable, contrary or hostile. Averse means having a strong feeling of opposition, antipathy, or repugnance. Merriam-Webster notes that adverse is commonly used as an attributive adjective (before the noun), while averse is rarely used in this situation.
  - Standard: They sailed despite adverse weather conditions.
  - Standard: He was averse to taking his medicine.
  - Non-standard: He is not adverse to having a drink now and then.
- aesthetic and ascetic. Aesthetic relates to an appealing or unappealing visual look or atmosphere. Ascetic is used to express the avoidance of pleasure due to self-discipline.
  - Standard: The aesthetics of the building were beautiful.
  - Standard: Some religions support ascetic practices.
- affect and effect. The verb affect means "to influence something", and the noun effect means "the result of". Effect can also be a verb that means "to cause [something] to be", while affect as a noun has technical meanings in psychology, music, and aesthetic theory: an emotion or subjectively experienced feeling.
  - Standard: The other benefit of class and collective actions is that they effect social and economic change.
  - Standard: This poem affected me so much that I cried.
  - Standard: Temperature has an effect on reaction spontaneity.
  - Standard: The dynamite effected the wall's collapse.
  - Standard: He seemed completely devoid of affect.
  - Non-standard: An IOC spokesman told Press Association Sport: "We were aware that FIFA might consider changing the dates for the 2022 World Cup. We are confident that FIFA will discuss the dates with us so as to co-ordinate them and avoid any affect on the Winter Games."
  - Non-standard: Some neighbors complain about Romney's new presidential entourage—including dozens of Secret Service agents who now guard the candidate 24 hours a day—and its affect on their quiet street.
  - Non-standard: His teammate Steve Nash can see how the time off had an affect on Gasol.
  - Non-standard: Seneca Jones Timber Co. executives say the pipe will effect 2,000 acres of their timberland, another 1,000 acres of property for roads, as well as public lands where Seneca harvests and transports logs.
  - Non-standard: The rain effected our plans for the day.
  - Non-standard: We tried appeasing the rain gods, but to no affect.
- aisle and isle. An aisle is a corridor through which one may pass from one place to another. An isle is an island.
  - Standard: He came from a small isle in the Caribbean.
  - Standard: The coffee is down the third aisle on the left.
- algorithm and logarithm. An algorithm is a step-by-step procedure, usually for calculation, the processing of data, or choosing among alternatives. The logarithm of a number is the power (i.e., exponent) to which a specified base must be raised to produce that number.
  - Standard: The board of directors developed an algorithm for choosing the company's new president from among the remaining candidates.
  - Standard: The algorithm for long division is usually taught in grade school. On the other hand, the algorithm for square root extraction, of which the best known pencil-and-paper form is still the one developed by Hero of Alexandria, is nowadays rarely taught, even in secondary school.
  - Standard: Using a base of 2, the logarithm of 32 is 5, because 2^{5} equals 32.
  - Standard: The number of octaves between two sounds is equal to the base-2 logarithm of the ratio of their frequencies.
- allow. The verb allow usually requires a referent. The construction "allows to" is a common error of German-speakers and South Asians with English as a second language. An accepted intransitive construction is "allows for" ("allows of" is also attested but obsolete).
  - Standard: The application allows users to download more quickly.
  - Standard: Roman law allowed a soldier to make a valid will without any formality.
  - Non-standard: The instrument allows to measure ...
  - Standard but awkward: "Allows to" can be used in this way, by moving the referent to the end: "The screen does not allow to pass any insects larger than gnats" and "A tenant who causes or allows to transpire damage to the property is liable ...". Such phraseology is awkward and should usually be rewritten, but not always.
- allusion and illusion. An allusion is an indirect or metaphorical reference to something; an illusion is a false picture of something that is there.
- appraise and apprise. To appraise is to assess or value something; to apprise is to teach or inform.
  - Standard: His performance was appraised very positively.
  - Standard: I lost no time in apprising her of the situation.
  - Non-standard: Has he been appraised of the fact?
- Arab and Arabic. As an adjective, Arab refers to people and things of ethnic Arab origin. Arabic refers to the Arabic language or writing system. Its use as a synonym for Arab is considered controversial by some.
- are and our. Are is the second-person singular present and the first-, second-, and third-person plural present of the verb be. Our means "belonging to us".
  - Standard: Are you coming to our house after the show?
  - Standard: Our family has been trying to save money because of the country's current economic situation.
- ascent and assent. To ascend means to go up or advance from an original position. To assent is to agree.
  - Standard: I watched the balloon's ascent into the sky.
  - Standard: We need to reach assent on how to do this project.
- assure, ensure, and insure. In American English, to assure is purely to intend to give the listener confidence, to ensure is to make certain of something, and to insure is to purchase or provide insurance for something. The only difference with British English is that assure can be used instead of insure, particularly in the context of life insurance or assurance.
  - Standard: I assure you that I will have your car washed by the time you return.
  - Standard: When you mow the lawn, ensure there are no foreign objects in the grass.
  - Standard: I plan to purchase the collision policy when I insure my car.
  - Standard: Progressive insured his SUV.
  - Standard: I already have more than enough life assurance.
  - Non-standard: His actions insured that the attacking army would fail.
- awaken and awoken: Awaken is typically used to express waking in the present tense. Awoken is typically used to express waking in the past tense. Awoken is the original "hard verb" inflection of "to wake", but through morphological leveling the soft form awakened has become more common.
  - Standard: We must awaken the dragon.
  - Standard: The dragon has awoken.

=== B ===
- barter, haggle and banter. To barter means to exchange goods rather than carrying out commercial transactions using money. To haggle is to negotiate a price. Banter is a noun meaning a friendly or good-natured exchange of remarks.
- belie. To belie means "to contradict" or "to give a false impression of". It is sometimes used incorrectly to mean to betray something hidden.
- bemused. To be bemused is to be perplexed or bewildered; however, it is commonly used incorrectly in place of amused.
- bisect and dissect. Bisect means "to cut into two"; dissect means "to cut apart", both literally and figuratively. Disect is an archaic word meaning "to separate by cutting", but has not been in common use since the 17th century.
  - Standard: The Americas are bisected by the Panama canal.
  - Standard: She dissected Smith's dissertation, pointing out scores of errors.
  - Standard: We dissected the eye of a bull in biology class today.
  - Probably non-standard: We bisected the eye of a bull in biology class today.
- born and borne. Born is when a living creature enters the world through the birthing process. Borne means to carry, realize, or bear something.
  - Standard: I was born on March 6, 1982.
  - Standard: I contracted mosquito-borne malaria while in Africa.
- brake and break. Break is a versatile word that, as a verb, means to separate something into pieces, to damage or destroy, to interrupt a continuous activity, or to exceed a limit, but as a noun, refers to a pause, a gap, a fracture, or a short rest period. Brake refers to a device or mechanism used to slow down or stop a moving object.
  - Standard: This might be a valid cause for pumping the brakes on reporting positive news, except we now have very strong reasons to radically reevaluate what these “new case” numbers really mean.
  - Non-standard: This week, Bevell pumped the breaks a bit.
  - Non-standard: The driver slammed the breaks and the passengers, those who hadn’t yet fainted or died, fell over.
  - Non-standard: Brooklyn residents are urging the city to pump the breaks on a new electric vehicle charging station set to be built across from an elementary school, insisting possible health risks aren’t worth the purported green benefits, The Post has learned.
  - Non-standard: It’s time to pump the breaks on romance rumors between country singer Megan Moroney and 49ers defensive end Nick Bosa.
- breath and breathe. A breath (noun) is the air that is inhaled or exhaled from the lungs. To breathe (verb) is the act of inhaling or exhaling.
- buy and by. Buy means to purchase or spend money on something. By is a preposition meaning close to or indicating who did something.
  - Standard: I want to buy a TV.
  - Standard: We are by the station now.
  - Standard: My favorite novel is by Ursula Le Guin.

=== C ===
- cache, cachet and cash. A cache (IPA: /kæʃ/) is a storage place from which items may be quickly retrieved. A cachet (IPA: /kæˈʃeɪ/) is a seal or mark, such as a wax seal on an envelope or a mark of authenticity on a product (usually used figuratively to mean "marked by excellence, distinction or superiority").
  - Standard: The pirates buried a cache of jewels near the coast.
  - Standard: Living in New York City definitely has a certain cachet.
  - Standard: But if a recommendation out of the Board of Governors meeting Tuesday in Las Vegas gets enacted as soon as this autumn, division titles would lose more than cachet.
  - Standard: The Wiz would be safer following the path San Antonio took with Leonard, only they haven't built up the cachet that allowed the Spurs to say, essentially, "Trust us. Hold tight as a cheap cap hold, and we'll make it worth your while."
  - Standard: This of course would be the second time Prokhorov was able to take advantage of a situation where his huge cache of cash helped him with the Nets.
  - Non-standard: It was easy: For one, he was an athlete who had made it, which provided the ultimate caché among parents who wanted their kids to go as far in sports as their talent could take them.
  - Non-standard: The greatest cache this team has is that one of the players has an umlaut in his name.
  - Non-standard: You need a couple of money guys (serious big money), then it doesn't hurt if you have a minority owner or two with some cache in said city to help win over the local fans.
  - Non-standard: Despite the celebrity status, big-name athletes seem to have more cache with average Americans than their cohorts from Hollywood or the Executive Suite.
- can't and cant. Can't is a contraction of cannot. Cant has a number of different meanings, including a slope or slant, or a kind of slang or jargon spoken by a particular group of people. "Canting arms" is a coat-of-arms that represents meaning of the bearer's surname.
  - Standard: I can't understand the dialogue in this book because it is written in cant.
  - Standard: Heralds do not pun; they cant.
  - Non-standard: I cant swim; I have never taken lessons.
- canvas and canvass. Canvas is a type of fabric known for being tough and strong. Canvass is a way to try to get people's support or find out where their support lies.
  - Standard: I use a canvas cover to protect the barbecue.
  - Standard: Canvass the block for information on their votes.
  - Non-standard: My political party needs to canvas the local neighborhoods.
- cloth, clothe and clothes. Cloth is the material that is typically woven and available in rolls, known as 'bolts' (though 'bolt' is a defined length of cloth) and sold in fabric stores. Clothe is a verb and refers to the action of putting on clothes that have been created using (usually) cloth. Clothes are garments that have been manufactured, usually using cloth.
  - Standard: I will look for a clothes shop to purchase some garments to wear.
  - Standard: At the local cloth shop I can purchase fabric to sew some garments.
  - Standard: I will clothe her in the new garment I have made, so that she may attend the ball.
  - Non-standard: This cloth shop only sells women's garments.
  - Non-standard: The clothes shop only sells bolts of cloth.
- complementary and complimentary. Things or people that go together well are complementary (i.e., they complete each other); complimentary describes an item given without charge (considered a 'gift'), usually in addition to a product or service that may have been purchased. It also describes praise given to someone or something.
  - Standard: Exercise, nutrition, and medical care are complementary factors in good health.
  - Standard: The motel provides a complimentary breakfast to overnight guests.
  - Standard: Jane was complimentary about the new couch, which she said complements the drapes and carpet.
- Similarly, a complement is an accessory, while a compliment is a statement of admiration.
- complacency and complaisance. Complacency means self-satisfaction especially when accompanied by unawareness of actual dangers or deficiencies. Complaisance means the willingness to comply with the wishes of others.
- contiguous, continual, and continuous. Contiguous means "touching" or "adjoining in space"; continual means "repeated in rapid succession"; continuous means "uninterrupted" (in time or space).
  - Standard: Alaska is not one of the forty-eight contiguous states.
  - Standard: The field was surrounded by a continuous fence.
  - Standard: The continuous murmur of the stream.
  - Standard: His continual interruptions are very irritating.
- contingent and contingency. As a noun, a contingent is a representative group; a contingency is a possible event.
  - Standard: The explorers were prepared for every contingency.
  - Standard: He was a member of the California contingent at the convention.
  - Non-standard: He was greeted by a contingency from the school board.
- copy write and copyright: Copy write means to make written copies for manuals, press releases, or advertisements. A copyright consists of select privileges that legally protect a work and prohibit its duplication.
  - Standard: Contact a copy writer if you need more advertisements written for the event.
  - Standard: This book has another five years of protection under its copyright.

=== D ===
- defuse and diffuse. To defuse is to remove the fuse from a bomb, or in general to render a situation less dangerous, whereas to diffuse is to disperse randomly. Diffuse can also be used as an adjective, meaning "not concentrated".
  - Standard: Bill's face turned red at Joe's tactless remark to the Kennel Club meeting, but Clarice defused the situation by turning it into a joke. "Not that even a Dachshund would stoop so low, of course!" she quipped.
  - Standard: The speaker droned on, his words like a powerful sleeping gas slowly diffusing through the stuffy air of the auditorium.
  - Standard: The spotlights went dark, leaving the scene lit only by the diffuse glow of the lanterns.
  - Non-standard: Houston was aware it was happening and worked to diffuse the campaign late in the process.
  - Non-standard: A government agency long associated with efforts to mediate and diffuse tense situations in communities helped organize rallies over the killing of Florida teen Trayvon Martin last year, a conservative leaning legal advocacy group claims.
  - Non-standard: Cavaliers small forward Luol Deng tried to diffuse all the questions about how emotional it will be facing his former team – the Chicago Bulls – Wednesday night at The Q.
  - Non-standard: After finding the suspected bomb, Pennsylvania state police were called in to diffuse it.
- desert and dessert. As a verb, desert means to abandon. As a noun, desert is a barren or uninhabited place; an older meaning of the word is "what one deserves", as in the idiom just deserts. A dessert is the last course of a meal.
- disassemble and dissemble. To disassemble means "to dismantle" (e.g., to take a machine code program apart to see how it works); to dissemble means "to tell lies".
- disburse and disperse. Disburse means "to give out", especially money. Disperse means "to scatter".
- discreet and discrete. Discreet means "circumspect". Discrete means "having separate parts", as opposed to contiguous.

=== E ===
- e.g. and i.e. The abbreviation e.g. stands for the Latin exempli gratiā "for example", and should be used when the example(s) given are just one or a few of many. The abbreviation i.e. stands for the Latin id est "that is", and is used to give the only example(s) or to otherwise qualify the statement just made.
  - Standard: A Briton is a British citizen, e.g., John Lennon.
  - Standard: Tolkien's The Hobbit is named after its protagonist, i.e., Bilbo Baggins.
  - Non-standard: A Briton is a British citizen, i.e., Paul McCartney (at the last count, there were about 60 million Britons—Sir Paul is far from being the only one)
- economic and economical. Economic means "having to do with the economy". Economical means "financially prudent, frugal" and also figuratively in the sense "sparing use" (of time, language, etc.)
  - Standard: Buying in bulk can often be the most economical choice.
  - Standard: The actor should be economical in his use of movement.
  - Standard: He attended the School of Economic and Business Sciences.
  - Non-standard: Leading economical indicators suggest that a recession may be on the horizon.
  - Non-standard: The actor should be economic in his use of movement.
- elicit and illicit. Elicit is a verb that means to draw out, evoke or obtain. Illicit is an adjective that refers to something illegal or improper.
  - Standard: The lawyer hopes to elicit convincing testimony from the witness.
  - Standard: Police found a large amount of illicit drugs.
  - Standard: They had an illicit love affair.
- emigration and immigration. Emigration is the process of leaving a country; immigration is the process of arriving in a country—in both cases, indefinitely.
  - Standard: Ethnic communities, such as Little Italy, were created by people emigrating from their home countries.
- eminent, immanent, imminent, and preeminent. Eminent, originally meaning "emerging", means "illustrious or highly-regarded". Preeminent means "most highly-regarded". Imminent means "about to occur". Immanent (less common than the other two, and often theological) means "indwelling, pervading".
  - Standard: The eminent doctor Jones testified on behalf of the defence.
  - Standard: Rumours that war was imminent soon spread through the population.
  - Standard: God's grace is immanent throughout the entire creation.
- emoji and emoticon. Emojis are actual pictures, whereas emoticons are typographic displays of a facial representation, e.g. :-).
- epitome is used to mean a typical or ideal example of something; an epidemy is an epidemic disease.
- eponymous is used to describe something that gives its name to something else, not something that receives the name of something else.
  - Standard: Frank, the eponymous owner of Frank's Bistro, prepares all meals in a spotless kitchen.
  - Non-standard: Frank maintains an eponymous restaurant, Frank's Bistro.
- ethic and ethnic. Ethic refers to morals. Ethnic refers to nationalities.
- every day and everyday. Every day (two words) is an adverb phrase meaning "daily" or "every weekday". Everyday (one word) is an adjective meaning "ordinary".
- exacerbate and exasperate. Exacerbate means "to make worse". Exasperate means "to annoy".
  - Standard: Treatment by untrained personnel can exacerbate injuries.
  - Standard: Do not let Jack talk to the state trooper; he is tactless and will just exasperate her.
- expedient and expeditious. Expedient means "done conveniently or quickly, but possibly improperly". Expeditious means "done efficiently", and does not carry any negative connotation.
  - Standard: The chef's expedient solution was to microwave the undercooked hamburger.
  - Standard: The chef's expeditious solution was to cook a new hamburger.

=== F ===
- flack and flak. Flak is adverse criticism or anti-aircraft fire (the latter being the original definition). A flack is a publicity agent or press relations person.
  - Standard: He took a lot of flak for his unpopular position.
  - Standard: The B-17 was shot down by German flak.
  - Non-standard: But he took no flack from her people.
- flesh and flush. To flesh out is to add flesh to a skeleton, or metaphorically to add substance to an incomplete rendering. To flush out is to cause game fowl to take to flight, or to frighten any quarry from a place of concealment.
  - Standard: The forensic pathologist will flesh out the skull with clay.
  - Standard: The beaters flushed out the game with drums and torches.
  - Non-standard: This outline is incomplete and must be flushed out.
- flounder and founder. To flounder is to be clumsy, confused, indecisive, as if flopping about like a fish out of water (a flounder being a kind of fish). To founder is to fill with water and sink (or, figuratively, to fail).
  - Standard: The ship is damaged and may founder.
  - Standard: She was floundering on the balance beam.
  - Non-standard: The ship is damaged and may flounder.
- flout and flaunt. One flouts a rule or law by flagrantly ignoring it. One flaunts something by showing it off.
  - Standard: If you have it, flaunt it.
  - Standard: He continually flouted the speed limit.
  - Standard: The diplomat's son flaunted his ability to flout the speed limit.
  - Non-standard: If you have it, flout it.
  - Non-standard: He continually flaunted the speed limit.
- forego and forgo: Forego means to go before. Forgo means to give up or do without.
  - Standard: After reading the foregoing paragraph, she decided to forgo the rest of the book.

=== G ===
- gone and went. Gone is the past participle of go. Went is the simple past tense of go.
  - Non-standard: Looking back on it, they should have went No. 1 in their respective drafts.
  - Non-standard: She had previously underwent a surgical procedure to remove an abscess discovered during a recent ultrasound.
  - Non-standard: Phoenix has went 5–15 over the last 20 games and now that Bledsoe is out with another knee injury, the Suns could potentially see their losing streak extend to seven as they face the elite Cleveland Cavaliers, San Antonio Spurs and Oklahoma City Thunder in their next three games.
- guarantee and guaranty. In legal terms, a guaranty is a binding assurance of the performance of a product or service, commonly a security for the fulfillment of an obligation (often on another's behalf), while a guarantee is a person who benefits from a guaranty (provided by a guarantor). However, it has become common for the word guarantee to refer to any assurance itself (often verbal, rather than a written warranty) of a certain outcome, including figuratively. The verb form has also become guarantee.
  - Standard: I guarantee that you will make a return on your investment.
  - Standard: The radio advertisement promised a three-month, money-back satisfaction guarantee.
  - Standard: The collision statistics to date seem to virtually guarantee several such accidents per month until this intersection is redesigned.
  - Standard: The completion bond firm lost its $50 million guaranty when the film production collapsed after the death of the director.
  - Uncommon except in law: This phone comes with a written one-year guaranty against defects. (Use warranty in most contexts, which is more precise and more common.)
  - Uncommon except in law: The guarantee studio received a $50 million payout from the completion bond firm. (Rephrase, e.g.: The studio received a $50 million guaranty payout from the completion bond firm.)

=== H ===
- hang. The standard past participle of hang is hung. The past participle hanged is reserved for execution by hanging, and sometimes for suicide by hanging, although usage guides differ on the importance of the distinction between hanged and hung.
- hangar and hanger.
  - Standard: The aeroplane is in the hangar; the coat is on the hanger.
- hay and straw. Hay is animal fodder made by cutting and drying a grassy plant. Straw is the dry stalk of a cereal plant (e.g., barley, oats, rice, or rye), after the grain or seed has been removed; it is used to line an animal's stall or for insulation.
- hear and here. To hear is to detect a sound with one's ears. Here refers to one's immediate location.
- hoard and horde. A hoard is a store or accumulation of things. A horde is a large group of people.
  - Standard: A horde of shoppers lined up to be the first to buy the new gizmo.
  - Standard: He has a hoard of discontinued rare cards.
  - Non-standard: Do not horde the candy, share it.
  - Non-standard: The hoard charged when the horns sounded.
  - Non-standard: It probably shouldn't come as a surprise; an angry hoard is calling for his head to be mounted on a wall.
  - Non-standard: Despite good progress on the team's bid for a new arena, the Bucks aren't getting LeBron James or Durant next summer, so why horde cap space to chase ghosts?

=== I ===
- imply and infer. Something is implied if it is a suggestion intended by the person speaking, whereas a conclusion is inferred if it is reached by the person listening.
  - Standard: When Tony told me he had no money, he was implying that I should give him some.
  - Standard: When Tony told me he had no money, I inferred that I should give him some.
  - Non-standard: When Tony told me he had no money, he was inferring that I should give him some.
- inherent and inherit. A part inherent in X is logically inseparable from X. To inherit is a verb, meaning "pass down a generation".
  - Standard: Risk is inherent in the stock market.
  - Standard: The next president inherits a legacy of mistrust and fear.
  - Non-standard: There is violence inherit in the system.
- it's and its. It's is a contraction that replaces it is or it has (see apostrophe). Its is the possessive determiner corresponding to it, meaning "belonging to it".
  - Standard: It's time to eat! (it is time)
  - Standard: It's been nice getting to meet you. (it has been)
  - Standard: My cell phone has poor reception because its antenna is broken.
  - Non-standard: Its good to be the king.
  - Non-standard: The bicycle tire had lost all of it's pressure.

=== J ===
- jibe and jive. Jibe is to be in accord with. Jive is hepcat patois or deception.
  - Standard: Don't give me that same old jive.
  - Standard: Your report doesn't jibe with the facts.
  - Non-standard: Your report doesn't jive with the facts.

=== L ===
- levee and levy. A levee is a structure built along a river to raise the height of its banks, thereby preventing nearby land from flooding (see: dike). To levy is to impose (1) a tax, fine or other assessment, or (2) a military draft; as a noun, a levy is an assessment or army thus gathered. The two words share a common root, but they are not considered interchangeable in Standard English. Because they are homophones, misuse is usually only apparent when observed in writing.
  - Standard: The Netherlands is well known for its elaborate system of levees.
  - Standard: This statute allows the state to levy a 3% tax.
  - Non-standard: Recent storms have weakened the levy.
- loathe and loath or loth: Loathe is a verb meaning "to strongly dislike", and loath (or loth) is an adjective meaning "unwilling" or "reluctant".
  - Standard: I loathe arrogant people.
  - Standard: I was loath to concede defeat.
  - Standard: I was loth to concede defeat.
  - Non-standard: Colangelo and Krzyzewski are loathe to break the players up into categories, but essentially, that's what is in place.
  - Non-standard: Which is why the Panthers were loathe to give him a guaranteed contract.
- loose and lose. Loose, as an adjective, can mean the opposite of "tight", the opposite of "tighten", or (datedly) "promiscuous"/"of lax morals"; loose, as a verb, means "release". Lose can mean "fail to win", "misplace", or "cease to be in possession". Lose is often misspelled loose.
  - Standard: We cannot afford to lose customers to our competitors.
  - Standard: A screw is loose and I need a screwdriver to tighten it.
  - Standard: Loose the hounds!
  - Dated: He regularly consorted with loose women.
  - Non-standard: If the team cannot score any points, they will loose the game.

=== M ===
- militate and mitigate. To militate is to fight or exert pressure for something to happen or not to happen; it is typically followed by a preposition. To mitigate is to make something milder, typically something undesirable, and takes no preposition.
  - Standard: The seriousness of your crime was mitigated by the provocation you were under.
  - Standard: Over-protective practices in this factory militate against increased efficiency.
  - Non-standard: Over-protective practices in this factory mitigate against increased efficiency.

=== N ===
- novice and novitiate. A novice is a prospective or trainee member, as of a religious order. The novitiate is the state of being a novice, or the time for which one is a novice. However, a novice monk or nun is often incorrectly described as "a novitiate" (perhaps confused with "initiate").

=== O ===
- of and have. In some dialects of spoken English, of and the contracted form of have, 've, sound alike. However, in standard written English, they are not interchangeable.
  - Standard: Susan would have stopped to eat, but she was running late.
  - Standard: You could have warned me!
  - Non-standard: I should of known that the store would be closed. (Should be "I should've known" or “I should have known”)
- overestimate and underestimate. There is frequent confusion between things that cannot and should not be over/underestimated, though the meanings are opposite.
  - Standard: The damage caused by pollution cannot be overestimated (i.e., it is so enormous that no estimate, however high, is excessive)
  - Standard: The damage caused by pollution should not be overestimated (i.e., while significant, it would be wrong to exaggerate it)
  - Standard: The damage caused by pollution should not be underestimated (i.e., it is wrong to regard it as minor)
  - Probably non-standard: The damage caused by pollution cannot be underestimated (literal meaning: it is so minimal that no estimate is too small. Intended meaning: probably as in the first or third example)

=== P ===
- palate, palette, and pallet. The palate is the roof of the mouth; used metaphorically to refer to one's preferences in food. A palette is a board for holding and mixing paint; used metaphorically to refer to a range or selection of colors or other features. A pallet is a wooden platform for raising stacked goods off the floor, or a thin sleeping mattress placed on the floor.
  - Standard: After unloading the boxes from the pallets, I slept on a pallet on the floor.
  - Standard: My palate is not very refined.
  - Standard: The artist placed globs of varying paint colors on his palette before beginning to paint.
- past and passed. Past refers to events that have previously occurred, while passed is the past tense of "to pass", whether in a congressional action or a physical occurrence.
  - Standard: Congress passed the bill limiting the powers of the President.
  - Standard: History is mainly concerned with the events of the past.
  - Standard: He went past my house on his way to the store.
  - Standard: He passed my house on his way to the store.
  - Non-standard: He past my house on his way to the store.
- peremptory and preemptive. A peremptory act or statement is absolute; it cannot be denied. A preemptive action is one taken before an adversary can act.
  - Standard: He issued a peremptory order.
  - Standard: Preemptive air strikes stopped the enemy from launching the new warship.
- perpetrate and perpetuate. To perpetrate something is to commit it, while to perpetuate something is to cause it to continue or to keep happening.
  - Standard: The gang perpetrated outrages against several citizens.
  - Standard: The stories only serve to perpetuate the legend that the house is haunted.
- perquisite and prerequisite. Perquisite usually means 'an extra allowance or privilege'. Prerequisite means 'something required as a condition'.
  - Standard: He had all the perquisites of a movie star, including a stand-in.
  - Standard: Passing the examination was one of the prerequisites for a teaching position.
- perspective and prospective. Perspective is a view with correct visual angles, example: parallel railway tracks converging in the distance. Prospective is a future possibility or expectation.
- perspicuity and perspicacity. If something is perspicuous, it is easily understood; its meaning is obvious. If one is perspicacious, then one is quick to understand or has good insight.
  - Standard: I admired her perspicacity; she just seemed to get it so much better than I.
  - Standard: He expressed the idea so perspicuously that anyone could understand.
  - Non-standard: She spoke in a perspicacious way.
- photogenic and photographic. The former means someone's likeness is particularly amenable to being well photographed. The latter is anything pertaining to photography whether it is technical, e.g., photographic chemicals or equipment, or generic, e.g., photographic journals.
- pored and poured. The phrase 'pored over' means to study an item intently, however sometimes seen incorrectly in its place is poured over, which would mean the act of tipping a substance onto something.
- prescribe and proscribe. To prescribe something is to command or recommend it. To proscribe somebody or something is to outlaw them or it.
  - Standard: The doctor prescribed some medicine to clear up the infection.
  - Standard: The new law was going to proscribe public gatherings.
- prevaricate, procrastinate, and prognosticate. To prevaricate is to avoid telling the truth. To procrastinate is to put off doing something that must be done. To prognosticate is to predict or prophesy.
- principal and principle. Principal is an adjective meaning "main" (though it can also be a noun meaning the head of a college or similar institution). Principle is a noun meaning a fundamental belief or rule of action.
  - Standard: The principal achievement of the nineteenth century is the rise of industry.
  - Standard: He got sent to the principal's office for talking during class.
  - Standard: I like a man who sticks to his principles.
  - Non-standard: The principle belief of Marxism–Leninism is the dictatorship of the proletariat.
- progeny, prodigy, and posterity. Progeny are offspring, or things that follow or develop from something else. A prodigy is a genius or extremely talented person (especially a young one). Posterity means future generations, or the future in a personified sense (usually used after "for" or "to").
- prosecute and persecute. Prosecute is the act of legally charging a crime. Persecute is the selective harming of certain groups of people.

=== R ===
- rain, reign and rein. Rain is liquid precipitation. A reign refers to the rule of a monarch. Reins are the straps used to control the movements of an animal (typically a horse). Thus, to "take the reins" means to assume control, and to have "free rein" means to be free of constraints.
  - Standard: From dozens of ideas floated to rein in skyrocketing costs of Oregon's public pension system, Gov. John Kitzhaber and lawmakers two years ago pinned their hopes on one, risky option.
  - Standard: Harrison would thrive in bench units with less attentive defenders and presumably a less capable lead guard who can let him take the reins from time to time.
  - Standard: And there are signs that ESPN's spending may need to be reined in.
  - Standard: Thursday's central bank comments came after analysts said allowing market forces free rein could drive the yuan sharply lower.
  - Standard: It is but one example of Israel's failure to rein in youths suspected of carrying out ultranationalist attacks.
  - Standard: Nationally, gambling has been slow to recover since the Great Recession as people continue to rein in leisure spending.
  - Standard: Button's representatives said in a statement Friday that police have told them such thefts have become a growing problem, with thieves pumping in the gas to give them free rein in the properties.
  - Standard: It's rare to bring homicide charges against a physician, but the case came amid a prescription drug abuse epidemic that has led lawmakers to try to rein in so-called pill mills that dole out medications with little scrutiny.
  - Standard: But reining in Maduro, who became president after Chavez died in 2013, will be tough.
  - Standard: A few months later, the ailing president, Boris Yeltsin, stepped aside and Vladimir Putin took the reins as Russian president.
  - Non-standard: ...the Suns gave Sports Illustrated's Jack McCallum free reign of practices...
  - Non-standard: Bobby Jindal, a whiz kid takes the reigns of Louisiana's Department of Health and Hospital
  - Non-standard: Taylor will be passing on the reigns of the neighborhood school to Assistant Principal Amy Kleiner.
  - Non-standard: ...his rein of terror in 1969 is fascinating part of the history of 20th century crime...
  - Non-standard: He spent the last four seasons trying to patch together lineups in Houston, where injuries reined supreme, and he had a great deal of success under the circumstances.
  - Non-standard: Wesley Johnson: It's more that Johnson was proven a long-limbed bust before Lindsey Hunter and a tanking Phoenix team gave him free reign to jack triples and perhaps clarify his NBA destiny. Johnson still shot just 32 percent from deep amid all that freedom; his chances of membership here look slim.
  - Non-standard: Over 13 games, he averaged 15.5 points and 9.9 assists while shooting 44.8 percent from 3-point range (while reigning in his attempts a bit).
  - Non-standard: The transition from the previous luxury tax system, which penalized teams one dollar for every dollar they went over the tax threshold, to the new one that includes an escalating pay scale for every $5 million teams go over the threshold, was supposed to reign in spending and help level the playing field.
  - Non-standard: If you're Mike Lupica you have the biggest column in one of America's largest circulation newspapers, you host a prestige show on ESPN each week and you have, presumably, free reign to talk about whatever you want to talk about in sports.
  - Non-standard: In fact, many moms say there's no way they would let their children do what their own parents gave them free reign to do as kids.
  - Non-standard: Brooks allowed Durant and Westbrook free reign as players and kept an open-door policy in terms of suggestions, not that he had much choice.
  - Non-standard: It'll be up to Doc Rivers and Chris Paul to reign Stephenson in early on.
  - Non-standard: Mexican fans reigned down debris on Panama players, and the match was held up for 11 minutes before Guardado stepped up to nail his first penalty kick and send the match to extra time.
  - Non-standard: Bryant has been given free reign for close to a decade.
- raise and raze. Raise means to move to a higher position while raze means to tear down.
- redundant does not mean "useless" or "unable to perform its function". It means that there is an excess of something, that something is "surplus to requirements" and no longer needed. It can also refer to a duplicate of something retained as a backup, failsafe, or reinforcement.
  - Standard: The week before Christmas, the company made seventy-five workers redundant.
  - Standard: A new pill that will instantly cure any illness has made antibiotics redundant. (Antibiotics could still be used to cure illnesses, but they are no longer needed because a better pill has been invented.)
  - Standard: The security system has two levels of redundancy.
  - Non-standard: Over-use of antibiotics risks making them redundant. (This should read: over-use of antibiotics risks making them ineffective)
- regime, regimen and regiment. A regimen is a system of order, and may often refer to the systematic dosing of medication. A regiment is a military unit.
  - Standard: The sick soldier was removed from his regiment.
  - Standard: The sick soldier was ordered to complete a regimen of amoxicillin.
  - Standard: But there were issues regarding his training regimen and conditioning, and he was demoted by the Kings last season to their American Hockey League affiliate in Manchester.
  - Standard: The story states that TB12 markets Guerrero's training regimen as "a proven approach to help people reach and maintain their peak levels of performance. Developed by Brady and his body coach, Alex Guerrero, their revolutionary approaches to wellness in the areas of nutrition and supplementation, as well as physical and mental fitness training, have helped athletes maximize their potential and maintain peak performance levels for more than a decade."
  - Non-standard: But wow, without the daily regiment of basketball, imagine what will happen to him?
  - Non-standard: Sports, science and technology are converging at an all-time pace and eight NBA teams are experimenting with a new device designed to optimize and personalize training regiments, thus the ability to maximize performance and reduce injury.
  - Non-standard: A treatment regiment, sometimes constant, was not enough.
  - Non-standard: It's going to require a lot of additional work but she already runs a lot as part of her training regiment for tennis.
  - Non-standard: It would appear that Guerrero's training, eating, and supplemental regiment works, at least for Brady, to whom Guerrero devotes near-constant attention by mapping out his training and nutrition years into the future.
- regretful and regrettable. Regretful is an adjective meaning to be full of regret. Regrettable is an adjective meaning deplorable or unfortunate.
  - Standard: She felt very regretful about her regrettable actions.
- revert. To revert is to return to a former state, not to reply or respond to someone.
  - Standard: The Hulk reverted to Bruce Banner after he had a nice cup of tea and calmed down a bit.
  - Non-standard: Thanks for your email, I will look into this and revert to you.

=== S ===
- sensual and sensuous. Both words mean "to do with the senses". Sensual is more often applied to a pleasure or experience or to a person's character; sensuous to someone or something of enticing appearance.
  - Standard: Don Juan is the most sensual character in fiction.
  - Standard: Ascetics believe in avoiding all sensual pleasures.
  - Standard: Marilyn Monroe looks extremely sensuous in this film clip.
- set and sit. When used as a transitive verb, to set means "to place" or "to adjust to a value", whereas to sit means "to be seated".
  - Standard: Set the pot upon the stove.
  - Standard: Set the temperature-control to 100 °C.
  - Non-standard: Set down over there.
  - Standard: Sit on the chair.
- shirk and shrink. To shirk means "to consistently avoid", "to neglect", "to be too afraid to engage". To shrink means "to contract", "to become physically smaller in size"; also, to shrink away means, "to suddenly jerk away from something in horror". However, to shrink from may also mean, "to hesitate or show reluctance toward".
  - Standard: I will not shirk discussion.
  - Standard: I will not shrink from discussion.
  - Standard: She shrank away from me.
  - Non-standard: I will not shrink discussion.
  - Non-standard: I will not shirk from discussion.
- shall, will, should and would. See Shall and will.
- since and sense. Since is used as an adverb or a preposition to imply the same meaning as "after then" or "from" in a sentence. Sense is a noun meaning any method to gather data about an environment.
  - Standard: I have known her since last year.
  - Standard: My sense of smell is weak.
  - Non-standard: I won't go sense I have no fuel.
  - Non-standard: I can since your aura.
- cite, sight and site. A sight is something seen; a site is a place. To cite is to quote or list as a source.
  - Standard: You are a sight for sore eyes.
  - Standard: I found a list of the sights of Rome on a tourist site.
  - Standard: Please cite the sources you used in your essay.
  - Standard: You must travel to the site of the dig to see the dinosaur bones.
  - Standard: It is necessary to have line-of-sight if you want to use semaphore.
  - Non-standard: One must be careful on a construction sight.
  - Non-standard: I will site the book in which I saw the statistics.
  - Non-standard: I could not fire because I did not have line-of-site to the target.
- stationary and stationery. Stationary is an adjective meaning "not moving"; stationery is a noun meaning office supplies.
  - Standard: The train remained stationary for a few moments, before lurching forward along the track.
  - Standard: We can pick up more paper and pens at the stationery store.
  - Non-standard: Let's go buy some stationary at the department store.
  - Non-standard: An object remains stationery until a force acts upon it.
- suit and suite. Suit is a noun meaning an article of clothing; it is also a verb meaning to make/be appropriate. Suite is a noun meaning a set of things forming a series or set.
  - Standard: He got dressed in his new suit.
  - Standard: Before leaving the hotel suite, she checked her lipstick in the mirror.
  - Non-standard: That wall color will suite our apartment nicely.

=== T ===
- taut and tout: Taut is when something is tight or stretched. Tout means to hype up, advertise, or promote.
  - Standard: You need to hold it taut to stretch it properly.
  - Standard: This concert needs a lot of tout to be successful.
- temblor and trembler. A temblor is an earthquake. A trembler is something that trembles (also, a fine-tuned motion detector).
- tenant and tenet. A tenant is a person or body that rents property. A tenet is a particular belief of a religion or other belief system.
  - Standard: I am looking for a tenant for my apartment.
  - Standard: One of the tenets of Roman Catholicism is the infallibility of the Pope.
  - Non-standard: "... to accept certain tenants of Islam while rejecting others".
- than and then. Than is a grammatical particle and preposition associated with comparatives, whereas then is an adverb and a noun. In certain dialects, the two words are usually homophones because they are function words with reduced vowels, and this may cause speakers to confuse them.
  - Standard: I like pizza more than lasagna.
  - Standard: We ate dinner, then went to the movies.
  - Non-standard: You are a better person then I am.
- their, there, they're, and there're. There refers to the location of something. Their means "belonging to them". They're is a contraction of "they are". There're is a contraction of "there are".
  - Standard: There're five of them, and they're all coming to the restaurant for their dinner; we will meet them there.
  - Non-standard: I don't like peanuts because of there texture when being chewed.
  - Non-standard: Bobby and Sally are coming over later and there bringing some friends with them.
  - Non-standard: The dogs are lying over their in the shade.
- there's, where's, etc. In spoken English, a singular contraction can be used in reference to a plural in words like there's and where's. This stems from the fact that there're and where're are more difficult to enunciate and are often avoided for that reason in colloquial speech.
  - Non-standard: Where's the cars? (Instead of Where're or where are)
  - Non-standard: There's many types of car. (Instead of There are)
- throe and throw. Throe is a spasm (more often seen in the plural throes). Throw means to propel an object through the air.
- to and too. Too means "in excess" or "also". To is a preposition or is a part of a verb in the infinitive. At the end of a sentence to may also refer to a dropped verb in the infinitive.
  - Standard: I have too much time on my hands.
  - Standard: Kick it to me.
- trimester. A trimester is a period of three months. Because it is most commonly used in conjunction with a nine-month academic year or a nine-month term of human pregnancy, it is sometimes wrongly assumed that trimester is a synonym for one third of a year or other period.
  - Standard: One calendar year contains four trimesters.
  - Non-standard: Without further delay, then, comes ESPN.com's annual (and overdue) First Trimester Report, ushering folks back to the office by taking stock of the season's opening third.

=== U ===
- use and used. Used is the past participle of use. Among its meanings is "accustomed". The expression used to is in some spoken accents similar sounding to use to, leading to confusion.
  - Standard: I always carry an umbrella because I am used to the weather being unpredictable in Melbourne.
  - Standard: An umbrella is what I use to avoid getting wet.
  - Non-standard: You should be use to it by now.

=== V ===
- venal and venial. These words are sometimes confused; venal means "corrupt", "able to be bribed", or "for sale"; venial means "pardonable, not serious".
  - Standard: According to Catholic doctrine, eating meat on a Friday during Lent is a venial sin, but murder is a mortal sin.
  - Standard: All ages have examples of venal politicians.

=== W ===
- waive and wave
  - Standard: Brent Barry, TNT's analyst for Thursday's Bulls-Knicks game, views Phil Jackson's latest experiment a lost cause and advocates Carmelo Anthony waive his no-trade clause to join a winner.
  - Standard: The forthcoming "pink slime" trial has the feeling to some degree of Hogan v. Gawker, insofar as there being a state court judge who waved off First Amendment objections to let a jury decide.
  - Non-standard: Scott waived off the notion that the Pac 12 might become a dumping ground for the SEC.
  - Non-standard: Tensions were apparently high at this meeting, and three SPD officers moved toward the pie-thrower — but Johnson waived them off.
  - Non-standard: Except, upon review, the referees said that the clock should have started when Cousins touched the ball and that meant the shot did not get off on time. The officials waived off the shot.
  - Non-standard: On the call, Van Gundy argued for Snyder to waive it off and end the game.
  - Non-standard: Only two people, Ed Gilmartin, vice president of Beta Theta Pi, and Ryan Foster, waved their right to a preliminary hearing.
  - Non-standard: In his post, Obama waives off the legal challenge.
- want, won't and wont. Want means the act of desiring or wishing for something. Won't is a contraction for "will not", while wont is a word meaning "accustomed" or "inclined to" (as an adjective) or "habit or custom" (as a noun).
  - Standard: He won't let me drive his car.
  - Standard: He spent the morning reading, as he was wont to do.
  - Standard: He took a walk in the evening, as was his wont.
  - Standard: His only want was to see his son again.
  - Non-standard: I wont need to go to the supermarket after all.
  - Non-standard: He took a walk in the evening, as was his want.
- warrantee and warranty. A warranty is a legal assurance that some object can perform some specified task or meets certain quality standards. A warrantee is a person who benefits from a warranty, provided by a warrantor. The verb form is warrant.
  - Standard: Most new cars come with at least a three-year warranty.
  - Standard: This contract warrants that you will make a certain minimum return on your investment.
  - Non-standard: Your mobile phone has stopped working? Maybe you need to file a claim under the warrantee.
- where and wherefore. Wherefore means 'why'. In the well-known passage from Romeo and Juliet she is not asking where he is but rather why he is Romeo, whose name only stands in the way of their love.
- who's and whose. Whose is an interrogative word (Whose is this?) or a relative pronoun (The people whose house you admired); who's is a contraction for "who is" or "who has".
  - Non-standard: Which brings us right back to Del Negro, whose navigated this mercurial stretch seamlessly.
  - Non-standard: But there remains a group of teams, of which the Brooklyn Nets are a member, who's fate remains in the balance.
  - Non-standard: Mr. Cent, who's real name is Curtis Jackson, was worth as much as $150 million earlier this year.
  - Non-standard: Well, more like 19 months older, but whose counting?
  - Non-standard: At 7’2 300, Haas is one of the only players in the country whose actually bigger than Hammons.
  - Non-standard: Embattled, hard-line, milquetoast coach who's job is on the line so he cuts it loose and starts winning???
  - Non-standard: Amy Carey, a VIPP volunteer whose the first to respond to a lost dog call, made it her mission to find the canines.
  - Non-standard: They have run the numbers and they know that enough guys slip through the cracks the first time they come through the league that it's worth giving unproven guys a shot as opposed to a veteran on the downside of his career whose already shown what he will be.
  - Non-standard: Duncan is getting older but he's still a 7’0 with one of the most refined post games in NBA history whose capable of stepping out and playing at the high post.
  - Non-standard: There's a world full of young basketball players who slipped through the cracks in their first stint through the NBA and there's no reason for any of the league's 30 teams to waste a roster spot on a proven commodity whose proven he can't play anymore.
  - Non-standard: Sen. Marco Rubio, who's seat is up, has said he will not seek re-election.
  - Non-standard: Renowned Dallas sports anchor Dale Hansen of WFAA believes that Starr isn't the only one who's job should be in the chopping block, however.
  - Non-standard: Track, supposedly the glue that brings the whole thing together, would be nothing more than a collection of pole vaulters, distance runners and others who's every accomplishment immediately falls under the lens of the ever-present doping microscope: Is anything you see in this stadium really to be believed?
- woman and women. Woman is the singular form of the word for an adult human female. Women is the plural form.
  - Non-standard: USADA is the national anti-doping partner of the Olympics, and Rousey spent much of her childhood training to compete in the Games, eventually becoming the first American women to medal in judo with her 2008 bronze medal campaign in Beijing.
  - Non-standard: The audience cheered as the woman were asked to leave, and everyone gave Lochte a standing ovation.
  - Non-standard: Keenly aware of her role as a women of color in media, Ifill once told The New York Times, "When I was a little girl watching programs like this – because that's the kind of nerdy family we were – I would look up and not see anyone who looked like me in any way. No women. No people of color.

=== Y ===
- you're and your. While they sound the same in many dialects, in standard written English they have separate meanings. You're is a contraction of "you are", and your is a possessive pronoun meaning "belonging to you". When in doubt, check whether the word in question can logically be expanded to "you are".
  - Standard: When driving, always wear your seatbelt.
  - Standard: If you're going out, please be home by ten o'clock.
  - Non-standard: You also can't use 4G or LTE if you're Android phone doesn't support Bluetooth tethering.
  - Non-standard: If you're first instinct is "man the USA lucked into the soft side of the bracket" your instinct would be correct.
  - Non-standard: From here, you draft supporting talent, develop that talent, add some veteran free agents, and if your lucky, you're on your way to truly competing.
  - Non-standard: You're mother called this morning.
  - Non-standard: Your the first person to notice my new haircut today!

== See also ==
- Commonly misspelled English words
- English language, English grammar, Disputed English grammar
- Engrish, Franglais, Spanglish, Yinglish
- Eggcorn
- Homonym, Synonym, Antonym
- Hypercorrection
- Malapropism
- Misspelling
- List of common English usage misconceptions
- List of dialects of the English language
- List of English homographs
- List of English words with disputed usage
- List of words having different meanings in British and American English

Wiktionary appendices

- List of dialect-independent homophones
- List of dialect-dependent homophones
