= Commonly misspelled English words =

Commonly misspelled English words (UK: misspelt words) are words that are often unintentionally misspelled in general writing. A selected list of common words is presented below, under Documented list of common misspellings. Although the word common is subjective depending on the situation, the focus is on general writing, rather than in a specific field. Accepted spellings also vary by country or region, with some rejecting the American or British variants as incorrect for the region.

Within a particular field of study, such as computer graphics, other words might be more common for misspelling, such as "pixel" misspelled as "pixle" (or variants "cesium" and "caesium"). Sometimes words are purposely misspelled, as a form in slang, abbreviations, or in song lyrics, etc.

In general writing, some words are frequently misspelled, such as the incorrect spelling "concensus" for "consensus" found in numerous webpages. Other common misspellings include "mispell" (for "misspell"), "equiptment" (for "equipment"), "independant" (for "independent"), "readible" (for readable), or "usible" (for usable or useable).

== Unlimited misspellings ==
Because many words can be extended with prefixes (such as "un-" or "anti-" or "re-") or suffixes (such as "-ly" or "-ing" or "-ness"), a comprehensive list of words prone to misspelling would contain thousands of variations from combining prefixes or suffixes (or both) added to the root words. To limit the scope to common words, the top 350 words are considered (according to various sources).

== Documented list of common misspellings ==
The following list, of about 350 words, is based on documented lists of the top 100, 200, or 400 most commonly misspelled words in all variants of the English language, rather than listing every conceivable misspelled word. Some words are followed by examples of misspellings:

=== A–B ===
- absence – absense, absentse, abcense, absance
- acceptable – acceptible
- accidentally– accidentaly
- accommodate – accomodate, acommodate
- achieve – acheive
- acknowledge – acknowlege, aknowledge
- acquaintance – acquaintence, aquaintance
- acquire – aquire, adquire
- acquit – aquit
- acreage – acrage, acerage
- address – adress
- adultery – adultary
- advisable – adviseable, advizable
- affect – effect (both words exist, but are distinct)
- aggression – agression
- aggressive – agressive
- allegiance – allegaince, allegience, alegiance
- almost – allmost
- a lot – alot (must be two words), allot (a lot and allot both exist, but are distinct)
- amateur – amatuer, amature
- annually – anually, annualy
- apparent – apparant, aparent, apparrent, aparrent
- arctic – artic
- argument – arguement
- atheist – athiest, athist
- awful – awfull, aweful
- because – becuase, becasue
- beautiful – beatiful
- becoming – becomeing
- beginning – begining
- believe – beleive
- bellwether – bellweather
- benefit – benifit
- buoy – bouy
- buoyant – bouyant
- business – buisness

=== C–D ===
- calendar – calender
- camouflage – camoflage, camoflague
- capitol – capital (both words exist, but are distinct)
- Caribbean – Carribean
- category – catagory
- caught – cauhgt, caugt
- cemetery – cemetary, cematery
- changeable – changable
- chief – cheif
- colleague – collaegue, collegue
- column – colum
- coming – comming
- committed – commited, comitted
- comparison – comparsion
- concede – conceed
- congratulate – congradulate
- conscientious – consciencious
- conscious – concious, consious
- consensus – concensus
- controversy – contraversy
- coolly – cooly
- daiquiri – dacquiri, daquiri
- deceive – decieve
- definite – definate, definit
- definitely – definitly, definately, definatly, defiantly
- desperate – desparate
- difference – diffrence
- dilemma – dilema
- disappoint – dissapoint
- disastrous – disasterous
- drunkenness – drunkeness
- dumbbell – dumbell

=== E–H ===
- embarrass – embarass
- equipment – equiptment (wrong in numerous webpages)
- exceed – excede
- exhilarate – exilerate
- existence – existance
- experience – experiance
- extreme – extreem
- fascinating – facinating
- fiery – firey
- fluorescent – flourescent
- foreign – foriegn
- forty – fourty
- friend – freind
- fulfil – fullfil (American: fulfill)
- gauge – guage
- grateful – gratefull, greatful
- great – grate, grat (grate and grateful both exist, but are distinct)
- guarantee – garantee, garentee, garanty
- guidance – guidence
- harass – harrass
- height – heighth, heigth
- hierarchy – heirarchy
- hors d'oeuvres – hors derves, ordeurves
- humorous – humerous
- hygiene – hygene, hygine, hiygeine, higeine, hygeine
- hypocrisy/hypocrite – hipocrit

=== I–K ===
- ignorance – ignorence
- imitate – immitate
- immediately – imediately
- indict – indite
- independent – independant
- indispensable – indispensible
- inoculate – innoculate
- intelligence – inteligence, intelligance
- jewelry (US)/jewellery (UK) – jewelery
- judgment – judgement (only a misspelling in the U.S.)
- kernel – kernal (distinct from homophone "colonel")

=== L–O ===
- leisure – liesure
- liaison – liason
- library – libary, liberry
- license – lisence (US always license, UK noun licence)
- lightning – lightening
- lose – loose (both words exist, but are distinct)
- maintenance – maintainance, maintnance
- marshmallow – marshmellow
- medieval – medeval, medevil, mideval
- memento – momento
- millennium – millenium, milennium
- miniature – miniture
- minuscule – miniscule
- mischievous – mischievious, mischevous, mischevious (The spelling "mischievious" and the corresponding pronunciation are still considered non-standard despite being current and existing since at least the 16th century.)
- misspell – mispell, misspel
- necessary – neccessary, necessery
- niece – neice
- neighbour – nieghbor
- noticeable – noticable
- occasion – occassion
- occasionally – occasionaly, occassionally
- occurrence – occurrance, occurence
- occurred – occured
- omission – ommision, omision
- original – orignal
- outrageous – outragous

=== P–Q ===
- parliament – parliment
- pastime – passtime, pasttime
- pedagogue – pedagoge
- perceive – percieve
- perseverance – perseverence
- personnel – personell, personel
- plagiarize – plagerize
- playwright – playright, playwrite
- possession – posession, possesion
- potatoes – potatos
- precede – preceed
- presence – presance
- principle – principal
- privilege – privelege, priviledge
- professor – professer
- promise – promiss
- pronunciation – pronounciation
- proof – prufe
- prophecy (as noun) – prophesy (valid as verb)
- publicly – publically
- quarantine – quarentine
- queue – que
- questionnaire – questionaire, questionnair

=== R–S ===
- readable – readible
- really – realy
- receive – recieve
- receipt – reciept
- recommend – recomend, reccommend
- referred – refered
- reference – referance, refrence
- relevant – relevent, revelant
- religious – religous, religius
- repetition – repitition
- restaurant – restarant, restaraunt
- rhyme – rime
- rhythm – rythm, rythem
- secretary – secratary, secretery
- seize – sieze
- separate – seperate
- sergeant – sargent
- similar – similer
- skilful – skilfull (American: skillful)
- speech – speach, speeche (archaic)
- successful – succesful, successfull, sucessful
- supersede – supercede
- surprise – suprise, surprize

=== T–Z ===
- than – then
- their – there, they're
- tomatoes – tomatos
- tomorrow – tommorow, tommorrow
- twelfth – twelth
- tyranny – tyrany
- underrate – underate
- until – untill
- upholstery – upholstry
- usable/useable – usible
- vacuum – vaccuum, vaccum, vacume
- vehicle – vehical
- vicious – visious
- what – wat
- weather – wether, whether
- weird – wierd
- welfare – wellfare, welfair
- whether – wether (a wether is a castrated ram)
- wilful – wilfull (American: willful)
- withhold – withold
- writing – writting, writeing
- you're – your
- your – you're

== Common causes of misspellings ==
=== Mispronunciation ===
Mispronunciation is known to be one of the most common causes of misspelling. Hence, phonetic misspelling is common, once a word is mispronounced. For example, the word realise may be misspelled as "relise".

=== Typing errors ===
Some spelling errors are introduced because the typing of certain people is not perfect, such as

- letters are doubled, or more frequently double letters tripled, such as "betwween" and "betweeen"
- letters are singled, such as "betwen"
- keys are transposed, so "because" becomes "becuase". (see Teh)

Some of the errors listed may be due to mistyping rather than ignorance, for example "solider" for "soldier", although these forms of errors rarely happen in handwritten text.

=== Homophones ===
Two (or more) differently spelled words with different meanings are homophones if they are nonetheless pronounced the same; e.g., "right", "rite", "wright", and "write"; "read" (most tenses of verb) and "reed"; "read" (past, past participle) and "red". This list includes only a few homophones although incorrect use of homophones is a very common error; the following words from the list are all correct English words, though often incorrectly used in place of their homophones:

- advice – advise
- affect – effect
- artic – arctic (colloquial UK usage for "articulated lorry")
- aweful – awful
- calender – calendar
- capital – capitol
- dose – doze
- hart – heart
- its – it's
- lightening – lightning
- principal – principle
- reign – rain
- rime – rhyme
- sight – site
- they're – their – there
- whether – weather
- you're – your

Spell checkers do not detect incorrect use of homophones.

=== Personal names ===
Personal names and surnames may be pronounced like a standard English word, but with different spelling: "balance" and "John Ballance"; "war" and "Evelyn Waugh" (if spoken with a non-rhotic accent); "marshal" and "George Marshall"; "chaplain" and "Charlie Chaplin". Personal names do, of course, generally start with a capital letter. Furthermore, personal names themselves have spelling variations, e.g. "Catherine", "Katharine" and "Kathryn", or "Stewart" and "Stuart", and sometimes a writer may be unaware of the correct spelling of a given individual's name.

=== Foreign writers ===
A misspelling in English might be made by someone used to a different spelling in another language; for example, "address" is translated "adresse" in French and German. Many Spanish words are similar or identical to English words, but with an "n" inserted, or replacing an "m", leading to errors: "inmigrant" from "inmigrante", "cementery" from "cementerio", "confortable" instead of "comfortable". The English word 'lose' reasonably looks like it should be pronounced as 'lose' to Germans, as in German the lone 's' often has the sound of an English 'z', and a lone 'o' in English very seldom has the 'oo' sound.

=== Apostrophes ===
There can be confusion over a plural possessive form. If the singular is "book's title" and the plural "books' titles", the latter can appear as "book's", or even "books's". The plural can be written with an erroneous apostrophe ("grocer's apostrophe" in Britain): "apple's and pear's". Elision can lead to misspelling: "doesn't", where the apostrophe represents the elided "o", can be misspelled "does'nt".

== See also ==
- Cut Spelling
- Haplography
- List of commonly misused English words
