= Haplography =

Accidental omission of content in text

Haplography (from Greek: haplo- 'single' + -graphy 'writing'), also known as lipography (from Greek: lip- from leipein 'to leave/to omit' + -graphy 'writing'), is a scribal or typographical error where a letter or group of letters that should be written twice is written once. It is not to be confused with haplology, where a phoneme is omitted to prevent two similar sounds from occurring consecutively: the former is a textual error, while the latter is a phonological process.

In English, a common haplographical mistake is the rendering of consecutive letters between morphemes as a single letter. Many commonly misspelled words have this form. For example, misspell is often misspelled as mispell. The etymology of the word misspell is the affix "mis-" plus the root "spell", their bound morpheme having two consecutive ss, one of which is often erroneously omitted. The reverse phenomenon, in which a copyist inadvertently repeats a portion of text, is known as dittography.

Other examples of words liable to be written haplographically in different languages are: German Rollladen ("shutters", from roll + Laden) which requires an uncommon sequence of three l‘s and is often spelt Rolladen, or Arabic takyīf تكييف ("air conditioning"), which would require a sequence of two semivowels y (one as a true semivowel, and another as a device to mark long ī) and is often misspelt as takīf تكيف, with only one.

The term haplography is commonly used in the field of textual criticism to refer to the phenomenon of a scribe's, copyist's or translator's inadvertently skipping from one word or phrase to a similar word or phrase further on in the text, and omitting everything in between. It is considered to be a form of parablepsis.
