= List of English words with disputed usage =

Some English words are often used in ways that are contentious among writers on usage and prescriptive commentators. The contentious usages are especially common in spoken English, and academic linguists point out that they are accepted by many listeners. While in some circles the usages below may make the speaker sound uneducated or illiterate, in other circles the more standard or more traditional usage may make the speaker sound stilted or pretentious.

For a list of disputes more complicated than the usage of a single word or phrase, see English usage controversies.

Abbreviations of dictionaries cited
Abbrev.	Dictionary	Further details
AHD4	The American Heritage Dictionary of the English Language	4th edition
AHD5	The American Heritage Dictionary of the English Language	5th edition, 2013, online
CHAMBERS	Chambers 21st Century Dictionary	2006
COD11	Concise Oxford English Dictionary	11th edition
COED	Compact Oxford English Dictionary	Lexico
ENCARTA	Encarta World English Dictionary	Online
FOWLER	The New Fowler's Modern English Usage	Revised 3rd edition (1998)
MAU	Garner's Modern American Usage	3rd edition (2009)
M-W	Merriam-Webster	Online
OED	Oxford English Dictionary	Online
RH	Random House Unabridged Dictionary	2006; on Dictionary.com

== A ==
- aggravate – Some have argued that this word should not be used in the sense of "to annoy" or "to oppress", but to mean only "to make worse". According to AHDI, the use of "aggravate" as "annoy" occurs in English as far back as the 17th century. In Latin, from which the word was borrowed, both meanings were used. Sixty-eight percent of AHD4's usage panel approves of its use in "It's the endless wait for luggage that aggravates me the most about air travel." M-W mentions that while aggravate in the sense of "to rouse to displeasure or anger by usually persistent and often petty goading" has been around since the 17th century, disapproval of that usage only appeared around 1870. RH states in its usage note under aggravate that "The two most common senses of aggravate are 'to make worse' and 'to annoy or exasperate.' Both senses first appeared in the early 17th century at almost the same time; the corresponding two senses of the noun aggravation also appeared then. Both senses of aggravate and aggravation have been standard since then." Chambers cites this usage as "colloquial" and that it "is well established, especially in spoken English, although it is sometimes regarded as incorrect."
- ain't – originally a contraction of "am not", this word is widely used as a replacement for "aren't", "isn't", "haven't" and "hasn't" as well. While ain't has existed in the English language for a very long time and is a common word in many dialects in both North America and the British Isles, its use in formal writing is not recommended by most usage commentators. The above notwithstanding, ain't is used by educated speakers and writers for deliberate effect or as part of a cliche, what Oxford American Dictionary describes as "tongue-in-cheek" or "reverse snobbery", and what Merriam-Webster Collegiate calls "emphatic effect" or "a consistently informal style".
- alibi – Some argue this cannot be used in the non-legal sense of "an explanation or excuse to avoid blame or justify action." AHD4 notes that this usage was acceptable to "almost half" of the usage panel, while most opposed the word's use as a verb. M-W mentions no usage problems, listing the disputed meaning second to its legal sense without comment. OED cites the non-legal noun and verb usages as colloquial and "orig[inally] U.S.". Chambers deems this use "colloquial".
- alright – An alternative to "all right" that some consider illiterate but others allow. RH says that it probably arose in analogy with other similar words, such as altogether and already; it does concede the use in writing as "informal", and that all right "is used in more formal, edited writing". AHD4 flags alright as "nonstandard", and comments that this unacceptance (compared to altogether etc.) is "peculiar", and may be due to its relative recentness (altogether and already date back to the Middle Ages, alright only a little over a century). Chambers refers to varying levels of formality of all right, deeming alright to be more casual; it recommends the use of all right "in writing for readers who are precise about the use of language".
- also – Some contend this word should not be used to begin a sentence. AHD4 says "63 percent of the Usage Panel found acceptable the example 'The warranty covers all power-train components. Also, participating dealers back their work with a free lifetime service guarantee.'" See also and and but (below).
- alternative – Some argue that alternative should be used only when the number of choices involved is exactly two. While AHD4 allows "the word's longstanding use to mean 'one of a number of things from which only one can be chosen' and the acceptance of this usage by many language critics", it goes on to state that only 49% of its usage panel approves of its use as in "Of the three alternatives, the first is the least distasteful." Neither M-W nor RH mentions any such restriction to a choice of two. Chambers qualifies its definition as referring to "strictly speaking, two, but often used of more than two, possibilities".
- a.m./p.m. – These are abbreviations for the Latin adverbial phrases ante meridiem ("before noon") and post meridiem ("after noon"). Some argue that they therefore should not be used in English as nouns meaning "morning" and "afternoon"; however, such use is consistent with ordinary nominalization features of English. AHD4 lists adjectival usage with "an A.M. appointment" and "a P.M. appointment". RH gives "Shall we meet Saturday a.m.?" without comment. Also, the National Institute of Standards and Technology contends it is incorrect to use 12 a.m. or 12 p.m. to mean either noon or midnight.
- amidst – Some speakers feel it is an obsolete form of amid. Amidst is more common in British English than American English, though it is used to some degree in both.
- amongst – Some speakers feel it is an obsolete form of among. "Amongst" is more common in British English than American English, though it is used to some degree in both.
- among/amongst and between – The traditionalist view is that between should be used only when there are only two objects (or people) for comparison; and among or amongst should be used for more than two objects (or people). Most style guides and dictionaries do not support this advice, saying that between can be used to refer to something that is in the time, space or interval that separates more than two items. M-W says that the idea that between can be used only of two items is "persistent but unfounded" and AHD4 calls it a "widely repeated but unjustified tradition". The OED says "In all senses, between has been, from its earliest appearance, extended to more than two". Chambers says "It is acceptable to use between with reference to more than two people or things", although does state that among may be more appropriate in some circumstances.
  - Undisputed usage: I parked my car between the two telegraph poles.
  - Undisputed usage: You'll find my brain between my ears.
  - Disputed usage: The duck swam between the reeds. (Undisputed if there are exactly two reeds)
  - Disputed usage: They searched the area between the river, the farmhouse, and the woods.
  - Undisputed usage: We shared the money evenly amongst the three of us.
  - Disputed usage: We shared the money between Tom, Dick, and me.
  - Undisputed usage: My house was built among the gum trees.
- amount – Some argue amount should not be substituted for number. They recommend the use of number if the noun is countable and amount only if it is uncountable. While RH acknowledges the "traditional distinction between amount and number, it mentions that "[a]lthough objected to, the use of amount instead of number with countable nouns occurs in both speech and writing, especially when the noun can be considered as a unit or group (the amount of people present; the amount of weapons) or when it refers to money (the amount of dollars paid; the amount of pennies in the till). (see also less)
  - Disputed usage: I was amazed by the amount of people who visited my website.
  - Undisputed usage: The number of people in the lift must not exceed 10.
  - Undisputed usage: I was unimpressed by the amount of water consumed by the elephant.
- and – Some argue that sentences should not begin with the word and on the argument that as a conjunction it should only join clauses within a sentence. AHD4 states that this stricture "has been ridiculed by grammarians for decades, and ... ignored by writers from Shakespeare to Joyce Carol Oates." RH states "Both and and but, and to a lesser extent or and so, are common as transitional words at the beginnings of sentences in all types of speech and writing"; it goes on to suggest that opposition to this usage "... probably stems from the overuse of such sentences by inexperienced writers." ENCARTA opines that said opposition comes from "too literal an understanding of the 'joining' function of conjunctions", and states that any overuse is a matter of poor style, not grammatical correctness. COED calls the usage "quite acceptable". Many verses of the King James Bible begin with and (though this could be regarded as a Hebraism), as does William Blake's poem And did those feet in ancient time (a.k.a. Jerusalem). Fowler's Modern English Usage defends this use of and. Chambers states that "Although it is sometimes regarded as poor style, it is not ungrammatical to begin a sentence with and." See also also (above) and but (below).
- anticipate – Although the expect sense is accepted by 87% of the Usage Panel, some prescriptivists insist that deal with in advance is the only correct use. Acceptance of the forestall sense has dropped to 57%.
  - Undisputed usage: We anticipated the coming winter by stocking up on firewood.
  - Disputed usage: We anticipated a pleasant sabbatical year.
- anxious – Some argue that this word should be used only in the sense of "worried" or "worrisome" (compare "anxiety"), but it has been used in the sense of "eager" for "over 250 years"; 52% of AHD4's Usage Panel accepts its use in the sentence "We are anxious to see the new show of contemporary sculpture at the museum." Also, it suggests that the use of anxious to mean "eager" may be mild hyperbole, as the use of dying in the sentence "I'm dying to see your new baby." RH states bluntly that "its use in the sense of 'eager' ... is fully standard." M-W defines anxious as "3 : ardently or earnestly wishing <anxious to learn more> / synonym see EAGER" Chambers gives "3 very eager • anxious to do well."

== B ==
- barbaric and barbarous – Barbaric applies to the culture of barbarians and may be positive ("barbaric splendor"); barbarous applies to the stereotypical behavior of barbarians and is negative ("barbarous cruelty"). This is standard English usage. However, M-W equates the third meaning of "barbaric" with the third of "barbarous", that is, "mercilessly harsh or cruel"; COD11 and Chambers list "savagely cruel" and "cruel and brutal; excessively harsh or vicious", respectively, as the first meanings for "barbaric". Only AHD4 disallows this usage, and without comment.
  - Undisputed. The environment of the venue was barbaric.
  - Undisputed. Terrorism is barbarous.
  - Disputed. Capital punishment is a disgusting, barbaric measure.
- begging the question – In logic, begging the question is another term for petitio principii or arguing in a circle, in other words making assumptions in advance about the very issue in dispute. It could also be understood as "beggaring the question", i.e. making a beggar of the question.

It is now often used to mean simply "raising the question" or "leading to the question". The latter usage does not match the usual pattern (e.g. "begging for money", "begging for mercy"), which would suggest "begging for the question".
- Undisputed. You argue that Christianity must be true because the Bible says so. Isn't that begging the question?
- Disputed. You want to go to the theatre. That begs the question which day we should go.

- but – Some argue that if and should not be used to begin sentences, then neither should but. These words are both conjunctions; thus, they believe that they should be used only to link clauses within a sentence. AHD4 states that "it may be used to begin a sentence at all levels of style."

== C ==
- can and may – Some argue that can refers to possibility and may refers to permission, and insist on maintaining this distinction, although usage of can to refer to permission is pervasive in spoken and very frequent in written English. M-W notes: "Can and may are most frequently interchangeable in senses denoting possibility; because the possibility of one's doing something may (or can) depend on another's acquiescence, they have also become interchangeable in the sense denoting permission. The use of can to ask or grant permission has been common since the 19th century and is well established, although some commentators feel may is more appropriate in formal contexts. May is relatively rare in negative constructions (mayn't is not common); cannot and can't are usual in such contexts." AHD4 echoes this sentiment of formality, noting that only 21% of the Usage Panel accepted can in the example "Can I take another week to submit the application?". For its part, OED labels the use of can for may as "colloquial".
- comprise – Comprise means "to consist of". A second meaning, "to compose or constitute", as in "comprised of", is sometimes attacked by usage writers. However, it is supported as sense 3 along with a usage note in M-W. AHD5 notes: "Our surveys show that opposition to this usage has abated but has not disappeared. In the 1960s, 53 percent of the Usage Panel found this usage unacceptable; by 1996, the proportion objecting had declined to 35 percent; and by 2011, it had fallen a bit more, to 32 percent." Collins gives a usage note: "The use of of after comprise should be avoided: the library comprises (not comprises of) 500 000 books and manuscripts". Some usage writers further say to use comprise only for exhaustive inclusion. Reuters suggests "Use only when listing all the component parts of a whole".
  - Undisputed usage: The English Wikipedia comprises more than five million articles.
  - Undisputed usage: More than five million articles are comprised in the English Wikipedia.
  - Disputed usage: The English Wikipedia comprises of more than five million articles.
  - Disputed usage: The English Wikipedia is comprised of more than five million articles.
  - Disputed usage: More than five million articles comprise the English Wikipedia.
  - Disputed usage: Diatoms comprise more than 70% of all phytoplankton.
  - Disputed usage: "Those in the industry have mostly scoffed at the young, inexperienced Carter and the rest of the high school pals that comprise the company."
  - Disputed usage: "Both the union and the league are comprised of many individuals, ..."
  - Disputed usage: "The committee is comprised of several NBA owners, including committee chair Clay Bennett of Oklahoma City."
- contact – First used in the 1920s as a transitive verb meaning "to get into contact or in touch with (a person)", AHD5 notes that its usefulness and popularity have worn down resistance. In 1969, only 34 percent of the Usage Panel accepted its use, but in 1988, 65 percent of the Panel accepted it in the sentence She immediately called an officer at the Naval Intelligence Service, who in turn contacted the FBI. In 2004, 94 percent accepted contact in this same sentence.

== D ==
- deprecate – The original meaning in English is "deplore" or "express disapproval of" (the Latin from which the word derives means "pray to avert evil", suggesting that some event would be a calamity). The word is now also used to mean "play down", "belittle" or "devalue", a shift that some disapprove of, as it suggests the word is being confused with the similar word depreciate; in fact, AHD4 states that in this sense deprecate has almost completely supplanted depreciate; however, a majority of the dictionary's Usage Panel approved this sense. Its use with the approximate meaning to declare obsolescent in computer jargon is also sometimes condemned.
- diagnose – Cochrane (2004) states that to "diagnose [someone] with a disease" is an incorrect usage of the verb diagnose, which takes the physician as subject and a disease as object (e.g. "to diagnose cancer"). In American English, according to AHD4 and M-W, the sense of "diagnose [someone] with a disease" is listed without comment or tag; however, for its part, RH does not list such a usage, with or without comment. For British English, COD11 offers "identify the medical condition of (someone): she was diagnosed as having epilepsy (2004); this usage, however, did not appear in editions as recently as the 1990s. Chambers does not offer this sense at all.
  - Disputed usage: Mr. Smith was diagnosed with diabetes.
  - Undisputed usage: The doctor diagnosed diabetes.
- different – Standard usage in both the UK and USA is "different from" (on the analogy of "to differ from"). In the UK, this competes with "different to" (coined on the analogy of "similar to"). In America, it competes with "different than" (coined on the analogy of "other than"). "Different to" is also found in Irish, South African, Australian, and New Zealand English.
  - Undisputed usage: The American pronunciation of English is different from the British.
  - Disputed usage: The American pronunciation of English is different to the British.
  - Disputed usage: The American pronunciation of English is different than the British.
- disinterested – Standard usage is as a word for "unbiased," but some have also rendered it synonymous with "uninterested".
  - Undisputed usage: As their mutual best friend, I tried to remain disinterested in their argument so as not to anger either.
  - Disputed usage: The key to attracting a member of the opposite sex is to balance between giving attention to him or her and appearing disinterested.
- due to – The adjectival use of due to is undisputed. Its adverbial use, however, has been a subject of dispute for many years, as witnessed by several (especially U.S.) dictionary usage notes that in the end designate it as "standard." William Strunk, in his Elements of Style, labelled the disputed adverbial use of due to as "incorrect." Although the first (1926) edition of Fowler condemned the adverbial use as "common ... only ... among the illiterate", the third (1996) edition said, "Opinion remains sharply divided, but it begins to look as if this use of due to will form part of the natural language of the 21C., as one more example of a forgotten battle." Due to is frequently used in place of by, from, for, with, of, because of, and other prepositions and prepositional phrases. Undisputed synonyms for due to are caused by and attributable to.
  - Disputed usage: He died due to cancer. (He died of cancer.)
  - Disputed usage: Due to the end of the Second War, circumstances altered profoundly. (With the end of the Second War, circumstances altered profoundly.)
  - Undisputed usage: His death was due to cancer.
  - Undisputed usage: Many thought the problem was due to mismanagement.

== E ==
- enormity – Frequently used as a synonym for "enormousness" or "immensity", but traditionally means "extreme wickedness". According to AHD4, this distinction has not always occurred historically, but is now supported by 59% of the dictionary's Usage Panel. COD11 states that enormity as a synonym for hugeness "is now broadly accepted as standard English." Although Chambers lists "immenseness or vastness" as a meaning, it says it "should not be used" in that sense, commenting that it is encountered often because the word enormousness is "awkward"; it recommends using instead another word, such as hugeness, greatness, etc.
  - Disputed usage: The enormity of the elephant astounded me.
  - Traditional usage: The enormity of Stalin's purges astounds me.

== F ==
- farther and further – Many adhere to the rule that farther should only refer to matters of physical distance or position, while further should be reserved for more abstract usages involving time or degree (as well as undisputed descriptions of moreover and in addition).
  - Disputed usage: San Jose is further from L.A. than Santa Barbara.
  - Disputed usage: L.A. was a couple of hours farther from home than I expected.
  - Disputed usage: If her fever increases any farther, I will call the doctor.
  - Undisputed usage: I would like to discuss the issue further at a later time.
- fortuitously – Used by some interchangeably with fortunately, strictly speaking fortuitousness is a reference to an occurrence depending on chance. M-W notes that use of the word in the sense of "fortunate" has been standard for at least 70 years, and notes that the sense of "coming or happening by a lucky chance" is virtually unnoticed by usage critics.

== G ==
- gender – Gender is often used interchangeably with sex in the sense of the biological or social qualities, male and female. It is never used to refer to sexual intercourse.
  - Gender traditionally refers to grammatical gender, a feature in the grammar of a number of different languages. Some argue that its use as a euphemism for sex is to be avoided as a genteelism; Fowler (p. 211) says it is used "either as a jocularity ... or a blunder."
  - Sex and gender can be used in different but related senses, with sex referring to biological characteristics and gender to social roles and expectations based on sex. Use of gender as interchangeable with or as a replacement for sex may confuse readers who draw this distinction. See gender identity, gender role.

== H ==
- hoi polloi – The question surrounding hoi polloi is whether it is appropriate to use the article the preceding the phrase; it arises because οἱ (hoi) is the Greek word for "the" in the phrase and classical purists complain that adding the makes the phrase redundant: "the the common people". Foreign phrases borrowed into English are often reanalyzed as single grammatical units, requiring an English article in appropriate contexts. AHD4 says "The Arabic element al- means 'the', and appears in English nouns such as alcohol and alchemy. Thus, since no one would consider a phrase such as the alcohol to be redundant, criticizing the hoi polloi on similar grounds seems pedantic."
- hopefully – Some argue this word should not be used as an expression of confidence in an outcome; however, M-W classes hopefully with other words such as interestingly, frankly, and unfortunately (which are unremarkably used in a similar way) as disjuncts, and describes this usage as "entirely standard". AHD4, however, notes that opposition to this usage by their usage panels has grown from 56% to 73%, despite support for similar disjuncts (such as 60% support for the use of mercifully in "Mercifully, the game ended before the opponents could add another touchdown to the lopsided score"). AHD4 opines that this opposition is not to the use of these adverbs in general, but that this use of hopefully has become a "shibboleth". OED lists this usage without any "colloquial" or other label, other than to say "Avoided by many writers". See also the discussion of hopefully as a dangling modifier. One investigation in modern corpora on Language Log revealed that outside fiction, where it still represents 40% of all uses (the other qualifying primarily speech and gazes), disjunct uses account for the vast majority (over 90%) of all uses of the word.
  - Disputed usage: "Hopefully, I shall be spared the guillotine", the prisoner thought.
  - Undisputed usage: Hopefully, the prisoner approached the guillotine. His hope was misplaced.
- humanitarian – The Compact Oxford Dictionary from 1996 has a usage note criticizing use of humanitarian as in humanitarian disaster, saying "the adjective humanitarian is often used inaccurately by reporters, e.g This is the worst humanitarian disaster within living memory, as if humanitarian meant 'of or relating to humanity'", though the current entry given by OxfordDictionaries.com has a more tempered commentary: "The primary sense of humanitarian is 'concerned with or seeking to promote human welfare.' Since the 1930s, a new sense, exemplified by phrases such as the worst humanitarian disaster this country has seen, has been gaining currency, and is now broadly established, especially in journalism, although it is not considered good style by all". Most dictionaries are implicitly neutral, giving no sense covering this usage but neither any usage comment criticizing it. However, besides the current OxfordDictionaries.com entry, Random House Dictionary, the Longman Dictionary of Contemporary English, and the Macmillan Dictionary all give senses for the use in humanitarian disaster.

== I ==
- impact – A large majority of the AHD Usage Panel has disapproved of the use of the verb meaning "to have an effect" since the early 1980s. Even in its 2001 survey, 85 percent of the Panel rejected the intransitive use in the sentence These policies are impacting on our ability to achieve success, and 80 percent rejected the transitive use in the sentence The court ruling will impact the education of minority students.
- ironic – Irony refers to an incongruity between what is expected and what actually occurs, especially if what actually occurs thwarts human wishes or designs. People often misuse ironic, applying it to events and circumstances that are simply coincidental, improbable, or unfortunate. In AHD's 1987 survey, 78 percent of the Usage Panel rejected the use of ironically in the sentence In 1969 Susan moved from Ithaca to California where she met her husband-to-be, who, ironically, also came from upstate New York. By contrast, 73 percent accepted the sentence Ironically, even as the government was fulminating against American policy, American jeans and videocassettes were the hottest items in the stalls of the market, where the incongruity can be seen as an example of human inconsistency.

== L ==
- lay and lie – Lay is a transitive verb, requiring a direct object. Lay and its principal derivatives (laid, laying) are correctly used in these examples: Now I lay me down to sleep. The chicken is laying an egg. Lie is an intransitive verb and cannot take an object. Lie and its principal derivatives (lay, lain, lying) are correctly used in these examples: My mother lies [not lays] down after meals. I fell asleep as soon as I lay [not laid] on the sand. The bills had lain [not laid] there all week. I was lying [not laying] in my nest when she rang.·
- less Some argue that less should not be substituted for fewer. Merriam-Webster notes "The traditional view is that less applies to matters of degree, value, or amount and modifies collective nouns, mass nouns, or nouns denoting an abstract whole while fewer applies to matters of number and modifies plural nouns. Less has been used to modify plural nouns since the days of King Alfred and the usage, though roundly decried, appears to be increasing. Less is more likely than fewer to modify plural nouns when distances, sums of money, and a few fixed phrases are involved <less than 100 miles> <an investment of less than $2000> <in 25 words or less> and as likely as fewer to modify periods of time <in less (or fewer) than four hours>."
  - Disputed usage: This lane 12 items or less.
  - Undisputed usage: We had fewer players on the team this season.
  - Undisputed usage: There is less water in the tank now.
- like and as – Some object to the use of like as a conjunction, stating it is rather a preposition and that only as would be appropriate in this circumstance. M-W, however, cites like's use as a conjunction as standard since the 14th century, and opines that opposition to it is "perhaps more heated than rational" (see M-W's entry "like [7, conjunction]"). AHD4 says "Writers since Chaucer's time have used like as a conjunction, but 19th-century and 20th-century critics have been so vehement in their condemnations of this usage that a writer who uses the construction in formal style risks being accused of illiteracy or worse", and recommends using as in formal speech and writing. OED does not tag it as colloquial or nonstandard, but notes, "Used as conj[unction]: = 'like as', as. Now generally condemned as vulgar or slovenly, though examples may be found in many recent writers of standing." Chambers lists the conjunctive use as "colloquial".
  - Undisputed usage. He is an American as am I.
  - Undisputed usage. He is an American like me.
  - Undisputed usage. It looks as if this play will be a flop.
  - Undisputed usage. This play looks like a flop.
  - Disputed usage. He is an American like I am.
  - Disputed usage. It looks like this play will be a flop.
- literally – Some argue literally should not be used as a mere emphatic, unless the thing to which it refers is actually true. It is used to disambiguate a possible metaphorical interpretation of a phrase. M-W does not condemn the second use, which means "in effect" or "virtually", but says "the use is pure hyperbole intended to gain emphasis, but it often appears in contexts where no additional emphasis is necessary".
  - Disputed usage: The party literally went off with a bang. [No, it did not, unless there was an actual loud noise.]
  - Undisputed usage: I literally ran more than 25 miles today. I ran a marathon.
- loan – The use of loan as a verb meaning "to give out a loan" is disputed, with lend being preferred for the verb form. AHD4 flatly states "[t]he verb loan is well established in American usage and cannot be considered incorrect"; M-W states "... loan is entirely standard as a verb". RH says "Sometimes mistakenly identified as an Americanism, loan as a verb meaning "to lend" has been used in English for nearly 800 years"; it further states that objections to this use "are comparatively recent". Chambers defines the verb loan as "to lend (especially money)". OED merely states "Now chiefly U.S.", and COD11 includes the meaning without tag or comment.
  - Undisputed usage: I lent him some money.
  - Undisputed usage: Fill out the paperwork for a loan.
  - Disputed usage: I loaned him some money.

== M ==
- meet – Some state that as a transitive verb in the context "to come together by chance or arrangement", meet (as in meet (someone)) does not require a preposition between verb and object; the phrase meet with (someone) is deemed incorrect. Chambers flags this usage "US"; RH allows it in the sense of "to join, as for conference or instruction: I met with her an hour a day until we solved the problem." On the other hand, none of M-W, AHD4, or COD11 entertains this usage. NOTE: In the sense of fulfilling prerequisites or criteria (We met with the entry requirements), or that of encountering (Our suggestions may meet with opposition; the soldiers met with machine-gun fire), the verb phrase meet with is not in dispute.
  - Disputed usage: I will meet with you tonight.
  - Undisputed usage: I will meet you tonight.
- momentarily – Traditionally, momentarily means "for a moment", but its use to mean "in a moment" is disputed. M-W and RH give this latter usage a standard entry without comment, while OED and Chambers tag it "N.Amer." AHD5 has a usage note indicating that 68% of their Usage Panel deems this usage "acceptable". See also List of commonly misused English words#M.
  - Disputed usage: Ladies and gentlemen, the captain wishes to inform you the plane will be in the air momentarily.
  - Undisputed usage: The flash from the atom bomb momentarily lit up the night sky.

== N ==
- nauseous – Traditionally nauseous means "causing nausea" (synonymous with "nauseating"); it is commonly used now as a synonym for "queasy," that is, having the feeling of nausea. AHD4 notes the traditional view, stating that 72% of the Usage Panel preferred nauseated over nauseous to mean "affected with nausea"; however, 88% of that same panel preferred nauseating to nauseous to mean "causing nausea"; in other words, a maximum of only 28% prefers nauseous in either case. It also states that in common usage, nauseous is synonymous with nauseated. M-W, however, asserts that "[t]hose who insist that nauseous ... is an error for nauseated are mistaken". Both M-W and AHD4 accept that nauseous is supplanting nauseated for "feeling nausea", and in turn being replaced by nauseating for "causing nausea" in general usage; they differ only on the correctness of the change. RH states "The two literal senses of nauseous [...] appear in English at almost the same time in the early 17th century, and both senses are in standard use at the present time. Nauseous is more common than nauseated in the sense 'affected with nausea', despite recent objections by those who imagine the sense to be new." CHAMBERS lists the sense of causing nausea first and affected with nausea second, while COD11 gives the affliction first and causation second; both dictionaries list the entries without comment. OED goes further, tagging its "nauseated" usage as "Orig[inally] U.S.", but demoted its "nauseating" usage to "literary". OED also notes that the original (now obsolete) sense of the word in English was "inclined to sickness or nausea; squeamish". Curiously, this oldest seventeenth-century meaning (inclined to nausea), while distinct from the disputed twentieth-century usage (afflicted by nausea), more closely resembles the latter than it does the prescribed meaning (causing nausea).
  - Undisputed usage: That smell is nauseous.
  - Disputed usage: That smell is making me nauseous.
  - Undisputed usage: That smell is nauseating.
  - Undisputed usage: That smell is making me nauseated.
  - Obsolete usage: You should not invite him to go fishing next week, as he is quite nauseous.
  - Obsolete usage: As she was a nauseous woman by nature, she avoided fishmongers' and butchers' shops.

== O ==
- overly – Fowler notes that some editors regard this as an Americanism. The American source M-W's Webster's Dictionary of English Usage, 1989, eventually settles on accepting it, but has this to say: "Bache 1869 and Ayres 1881 succinctly insulted contemporaries who used this word, calling them vulgar and unschooled. Times have changed: modern critics merely insult the word itself. Follett 1966, for example, claims that overly is useless, superfluous, and unharmonious, and should be replaced by the prefix over-. Bryson 1984 adds that 'when this becomes overinelegant ... the alternative is to find another adverb [...]'." The prefix over- is safer, and accepted by all: "He seemed over-anxious." M-W, AHD4, and RH include the word without comment, and OED notes only "After the Old English period, rare (outside Scotland and North America) until the 20th cent." In most cases "too" or "excessively" would be better choices than "over-".

== P ==
- people and persons – Today, all major style guides recommend people. For example, the Associated Press and the New York Times recommend "people" except in quotations and set phrases. Under the traditional distinction, which Garner says is pedantic, persons describes a finite, known number of individuals, rather than the collective term people. This debate raged towards the end of the 19th century. "Persons" is correct in technical and legal contexts.
  - Disputed usage: There are 15 people registered to attend.
  - Undisputed usage: There are countless people online at this moment.
  - Undisputed usage: The law makes special provision for children and young persons.
  - Undisputed usage: In Christian theology there are three persons in the Trinity.
- pleasantry originally meant a joke or witticism (as in French plaisanterie). It is now generally used to mean only polite conversation in general (as in the phrase "exchange of pleasantries").
- presently – Traditionally, presently is held to mean "after a short period of time" or "soon". It is also used in the sense "at the present time" or "now", a usage which is disapproved of by many, though in medieval and Elizabethan times "presently" meant "now" (but in the sense of "immediately" rather than "currently"). RH dates the sense of "now" back to the 15th century—noting it is "in standard use in all varieties of speech and writing in both Great Britain and the United States"—and dates the appearance of the sense of "soon" to the 16th century. It considers the modern objection to the older sense "strange", and comments that the two senses are "rarely if ever confused in actual practice. Presently meaning 'now' is most often used with the present tense (The professor is presently on sabbatical leave) and presently meaning 'soon' often with the future tense (The supervisor will be back presently)." M-W mentions the same vintage for the sense of "now", and that "it is not clear why it is objectionable." AHD4 states that despite its use "nowadays in literate speech and writing" that there is still " lingering prejudice against this use". In the late 1980s, only 50% of the dictionary's Usage Panel approved of the sentence General Walters is … presently the United States Ambassador to the United Nations. COD11 lists both usages without comment; CHAMBERS merely flags the sense of "now" as "N Amer, especially US".
  - Disputed usage: I am presently reading Wikipedia.
  - Undisputed usage: I will be finished with that activity presently.

== R ==
- raise and rear – Some people argue that raise should not be used to mean an upbringing of a being, since raise originally meant to cause something or someone to rise, and rear meant to bring up something or someone. Although raise was formerly condemned in this sense, it may now be considered standard, at least with regard to animals, and is common at least informally with regard to human children.
  - Disputed usage: You rear hogs, but you raise children.
  - Disputed usage: You raise hogs, but you rear children.
  - Undisputed usage: You rear hogs, and you rear children.
- raise and rise – According to traditional rules of English grammar, "raise is almost always used transitively", whereas "rise is almost exclusively intransitive in its standard uses". However, because of their similar meanings, they may be used by many informal speakers as though they were interchangeable.
  - Disputed usage: The elevator was raising.
  - Disputed usage: The elevator was being risen.
  - Undisputed usage: The elevator was rising.
  - Undisputed usage: The elevator was being raised.
- refute – The traditional meaning of refute is "disprove" or "dispel with reasoned arguments". It is now often used as a synonym for "deny". The latter sense is listed without comment by M-W and AHD4, while CHAMBERS tags it as colloquial. COD11 states that "Traditionalists object to [the use of refute as deny], but it is now widely accepted in standard English." However, RH does not mention this use at all. Refute is also often confused with rebut; a rebuttal, in formal debate terms, is a counter-refutation, and it also has a specific legal sense, though like refutation, the word has taken on the informal and disputed meaning of denial.
- relatively – Literally meaning "compared with", some now use relatively to mean "moderately" or "somewhat" (perhaps in the sense of "compared to the average or to the expectation"). AHD4 does not list this usage at all; M-W has apparently blended the two usages into one.
  - Disputed usage: That man was relatively annoying.
  - Undisputed usage: Though relatively harmless when compared with dimethylmercury, mercury (II) oxide is still quite toxic.

== S ==
- Scottish, Scots and Scotch – Formerly, "Scotch" was used as an alternative for "Scots" or "Scottish". The current convention is as follows:
  - "Scottish" for most purposes, including people, animals, and things in general.
  - "Scots" also for people, and for identifiably human matters and institutions (e.g., the Scots, Scotsmen; Scots Law (capitalised); the Scots language, which is never "the Scottish language"; rarely Scots culture, which is more commonly Scottish culture). It appears in combining form in Scots-Irish. The Scots pine is named after Scotland, though not limited to it.
  - "Scotch" is sometimes (and decreasingly) used for foods produced in Scotland (e.g., Scotch salmon, Scotch tomatoes; more commonly Scottish), and always for Scotch whisky (never "Scottish whisky"). It also appears in Scotch bonnet, Scotch egg, Scotch broth and the scotch doubles tournament format (which is usually lower-cased); and in the Scotch Game or Scotch Opening in chess. Scotch is otherwise best avoided, especially as applied to people, as Scots themselves consider it offensive, including the archaic Scotchmen.

There is also the unrelated verb scotch (also lower-cased), as in the following example from Shakespeare's Macbeth:
- Undisputed usage: "We have scotched the snake, not killed it."

- seek – This means "look for", but is sometimes used to mean "try" or "want". The latter usage is criticised by Fowler in the entry "Formal Words".
  - Disputed usage: "... we did seek to resolve the Iraq crisis by peaceful means ... those who seek to emulate his legacy of murder ... the Conservatives seek to undermine that future ..."

- Undisputed usage: "Seek and ye shall find."

== T ==
- than – Than is the subject of a longstanding dispute as to its status as a preposition or conjunction.
- they – Originally the third person plural pronoun, but sometimes used with a singular meaning. It may be used to refer either to an indefinite individual, or to a specific individual of unknown, unspecified, or non-binary gender. This singular usage has traditionally been considered informal but is becoming more accepted in formal writing. For example, The Washington Post in 2015 deemed it permissible as a last resort. The Chicago Manual of Style in 2017 acklowledged its growing popularity but still recommended avoiding it when possible.
  - Disputed usage: A person is rude if they show no respect for their hosts.
  - Undisputed usage: One is rude if one shows no respect for one's hosts.
  - Undisputed usage: It is rude not to show respect for hosts.
- thusly – Thusly (AHD4 suggests) was originally coined by educated writers to make fun of uneducated people trying to sound genteel. The word "thusly" appears with no associated usage notes in M-W; COD11 tags it as "informal", with the entry thus tagged as "literary or formal". CHAMBERS does not list the word at all, and it is unknown in British usage. MAU considers it a nonword and laments that it appears in otherwise respectable writing. However, thusly has diffused into popular usage. Some people accept it as an adverb in its own right, while others believe thus should be used in all cases.

== U ==
- unique – Some usage critics and style guides have argued that unique means only "sole" or "without equal". The AP Stylebook says "it means one of a kind. Do not describe something as rather unique, most unique, or very unique" but most dictionaries do give a third meaning: "unusual", which can be qualified by, quite, very, somewhat, as in "The theme of the party was somewhat unique" (see comparison). M-W has a usage (i.e. descriptive) note under its entry for "unique", which says in part "Many commentators have objected to the comparison or modification (as by somewhat or very) of unique, often asserting that a thing is either unique or it is not. Objections are based chiefly on the assumption that unique has but a single absolute sense, an assumption contradicted by information readily available in a dictionary." The Merriam-Webster Dictionary of English Usage is quite plain in its disagreement with the critics:
  Those who insist that unique cannot be modified by such adverbs as more, most, and very are clearly wrong: our evidence shows that it can be and frequently is modified by such adverbs.

- Disputed usage: "As documented in depth by the Boston Globe, Massachusetts high schools feature some of the most uniquely oriented fields in all of baseball." "None of those may be more unique than the field that Braintree (Mass.) High calls home." "The setting has required some rather unique rule modifications to work in the town hall." "While French's Common may be the Bay State's most unique park, it certainly isn't alone."

- urgent – The primary meaning of urgent is as a description of a pressing need. Especially in journalistic contexts, it is sometimes used by transference to describe the thing needed, or to mean "happening very soon".
  - Undisputed usage: There is an urgent need for talks
  - Disputed usage: There is a need for urgent talks
  - Disputed usage: The President promised that urgent talks would be held

== W ==
- whilst and while – Penguin Working Words recommends while only, and notes that whilst is old-fashioned. Cambridge Guide to English Usage and M-W's Webster's Guide to English Usage comment on its regional character, and note that it is rare in American usage. It is thus safer to use only while in international English. Both whilst and amongst are excrescent inflections of the more standard while and among, and could be classified as grammatically incorrect; however, other excrescent inflections are widely accepted in Modern English (against, midst, etc.), and some others are widely encountered in both forms (amid and amidst, among and amongst). Although against has no widely acceptable alternative, mid- or middle can be substituted for some uses of midst (the stock phrase in their/our midst remains common and has no widely accepted alternative using mid or middle).
- who – Some argue that who should be used only as a subject pronoun, the corresponding object pronoun being whom. Strictly speaking, using who instead of whom is substituting a subjective pronoun for an objective pronoun and hence is the same as using she instead of her (e.g., "I saw she today."). Most people never use whom in spoken English and instead use who for all cases. Those who use whom in everyday speech may recognize substitution of who as substandard. Fowler's has an extensive entry on who and whom including several quotes from major publications where whom is used incorrectly.
  - Undisputed usage: You are talking to whom?
  - Disputed usage: You are talking to who?
  - Undisputed usage: To whom are you talking?
  - Widely disputed usage: To who are you talking?
  - Disputed usage: Who are you talking to?
  - Incorrect usage: "... far more hostile to Diana whom she believes betrayed the Prince of Wales" – Independent Magazine, 1993 (FOWLER)
  - Undisputed usage: "... far more hostile to Diana who she believes betrayed the Prince of Wales"
  - Disputed usage: "Whom do men say that I am?" (Mark 9:27, King James Version)
- whoever – This extension of who (see above) along with its object form whomever is attended by the same uncertainties as who along with whom, and is discussed in the same sources. (See the relevant section at Who.)
  - Undisputed usage: Give it to whoever wants it.
  - Undisputed usage: Give it to whoever you think should have it.
  - Undisputed usage: Give it to whomever you choose to give it.
  - Disputed usage: Give it to whoever you choose to give it to.
  - Disputed usage: Give it to whomever wants it.
  - Disputed usage: Give it to whomever you think should have it.
- whose – The use of whose to refer to non-persons (called inanimate whose) has drawn criticism from those who note that it derives from who, which can be used only with persons and the personified. English lacks a possessive form of which, so there is no word that could substitute for whose in the disputed example below to make it undisputed; the sentence would have to be reworded. Usually that is done with of which constructions, though these can sometimes be awkward or stilted and may inspire further rewriting.
  - Undisputed usage: That's the woman whose husband keeps waking us up at night.
  - Disputed usage: That's the car whose alarm keeps waking us up at night.
  - Undisputed rewording, but potentially stilted: That's the car of which the alarm keeps waking us up at night.
  - Undisputed rewording, but potentially stilted, though less so than immediately above: That's the car, the alarm of which keeps waking us up at night.
  - Undisputed rewording: That car's alarm is the one that keeps waking us up at night.
