= Usage (language) =

Ways that speakers of a language use words

The usage of a language or language variety is the way in which its written and spoken variations are routinely employed by its speakers; that is, it refers to "the collective habits of a language's native speakers", as opposed to idealized models of how a language works (or should work) in the abstract. For instance, Fowler characterized usage as "the way in which a word or phrase is normally and correctly used" and as the "points of grammar, syntax, style, and the choice of words." In everyday usage, language is used differently, depending on the situation and individual. Individual language users can shape language structures and language usage based on their community.

In the descriptive tradition of language analysis, by way of contrast, "correct" tends to mean functionally adequate for the purposes of the speaker or writer using it, and adequately idiomatic to be accepted by the listener or reader; usage is also, however, a concern for the prescriptive tradition, for which "correctness" is a matter of arbitrating style.

Common usage may be used as one of the criteria of laying out prescriptive norms for codified standard language usage.

Everyday language users, including editors and writers, look at dictionaries, style guides, usage guides, and other published authoritative works to help inform their language decisions. This takes place because of the perception that Standard English is determined by language authorities. For many language users, the dictionary is the source of correct language use, as far as accurate vocabulary and spelling go. Modern dictionaries are not generally prescriptive, but they often include "usage notes" which may describe words as "formal", "informal", "slang", and so on. "Despite occasional usage notes, lexicographers generally disclaim any intent to guide writers and editors on the thorny points of English usage."

== Analysis ==
Lexicographers gather samples of word usage and analyze them to determine patterns of regional or social usage as well as meaning. A word may be only a rare regional usage, or a word may be used worldwide by standard English speakers and have one or several evolving definitions. Since people in a community or group tend to have similar word usage patterns, analysis of these patterns can be a way to predict the communities and groups a person belongs to.

== History ==
According to Jeremy Butterfield, "The first person we know of who made usage refer to language was Daniel Defoe, at the end of the seventeenth century". Defoe proposed the creation of a language society of 36 individuals who would set prescriptive language rules for the approximately six million English speakers.

The Latin equivalent usus was a crucial term in the research of Danish linguists Otto Jespersen and Louis Hjelmslev. In Polish linguistics, the term usus (uzus językowy) is used to designate usage that has widespread or significant acceptance among speakers of the Polish language, regardless of its conformity to what is prescribed as correct.

== See also ==
- Error (linguistics)
- English writing style
- Idiom (language structure)
- Common English usage misconceptions
- List of English words with disputed usage
- Text mining
- Semantic change
