= List of style guides =

Text and document formatting standards

A style guide, or style manual, is a set of standards for the writing and design of documents, either for general use or for a specific publication, organization or field. The implementation of a style guide provides uniformity in style and formatting within a document and across multiple documents. A set of standards for a specific organization is often known as an "in-house style". Style guides are common for general and specialized use, for the general reading and writing audience, and for students and scholars of medicine, journalism, law, and various academic disciplines.

== International ==
Several basic style guides for technical and scientific communication have been defined by international standards organizations. These are often used as elements of and refined in more specialized style guides that are specific to a subject, region, or organization. Some examples are:

- EN 15038, Annex D – European Standard for Translation Services (withdrawn)
- ISO 8 – Presentation of periodicals
- ISO 18 – Contents lists of periodicals
- ISO 31 – Quantities and units
- ISO 214 – Abstracts for publication and documentation
- ISO 215 – Presentation of contributions to periodicals and other serials
- ISO 690 – Bibliographic references – Content, form & structure
- ISO 832 – Bibliographic references – Abbreviations of typical words
- ISO 999 – Index of a publication
- ISO 1086 – Title leaves of a book
- ISO 2145 – Numbering of divisions and subdivisions in written documents
- ISO 5966 – Presentation of scientific and technical reports (withdrawn)
- ISO 6357 – Spine titles on books and other publications
- ISO 7144 – Presentation of theses and similar documents
- ISO 9241 – Ergonomics of Human System Interaction
- ISO 17100 – Translation Services-Requirements for Translation Services

Other style guides that cover international usage:

- The Cambridge Guide to English Usage, by Cambridge University Press
- The Global English Style Guide, by SAS Institute

== Australia ==
=== General ===
- Australian Government Style Manual by Digital Transformation Agency. 7th ed.
- Style Manual: For Authors, Editors and Printers by Snooks & Co for the Department of Finance and Administration. 6th ed. ISBN 0701636483.
- The Australian Handbook for Writers and Editors by Margaret McKenzie. 4th ed. ISBN 9781921606496.
- The Cambridge Guide to Australian English Usage by Pam Peters of Macquarie University. 2nd ed. ISBN 9780521702423.
- The Complete Guide to English Usage for Australian Students by Margaret Ramsay. 6th ed. ISBN 9780521702423.

=== Law ===
- Australian Guide to Legal Citation published by University of Melbourne Law School. 4th ed. ISBN 9780521702423.

=== Science ===
- Australian manual of scientific style (AMOSS) by Biotext; illustrated by Biotext. 1st ed. ISBN 9780994636904

== Canada ==
- "The Canadian style: a guide to writing and editing : : S2-158/1996E". Government of Canada Publications. 1 July 2002.
  - "Writing resources—Writing guidelines – Collection of Canadian language resources". Canada.ca. Translation Bureau - Government of Canada.
- "TERMIUM Plus -Writing Tips Plus – Writing Tools". Canada.ca. Translation Bureau - Government of Canada.
- Canada. Secretary of State (1997). The Canadian Style: A Guide to Writing and Editing. Dundurn Press. ISBN 978-1-55488-317-2.
- "Writing and Editing Style Guides". The Canadian Press. 14 July 2023.
- The Canadian Oxford Dictionary. Oxford University Press. 1 January 2004. doi:10.1093/acref/9780195418163.001.0001. ISBN 978-0-19-541816-3.
- Virag, Karen Jean. Editing Canadian English. ISBN 978-0-9869456-1-8.
- McFarlane, J.A.; Clements, W. (1998). The Globe and Mail Style Book: A Guide to Language and Usage. McClelland & Stewart. ISBN 978-0-7710-3337-7.
- Geoscience Reporting Guidelines—for geoscience reports in industry, academia and other disciplines.

== European Union ==
- Council of Europe - English Style Guide, by the Council of Europe
- English Style Guide ("A handbook for authors and translators in the European Commission" – executive branch of the European Union.)
- Interinstitutional Style Guide.

== New Zealand ==
=== For general writing ===
- New Zealand Style Guide, by Flickerwell.

=== For electronic publishing ===
- Content design guidance, by Digital.govt.nz.

== United Kingdom ==
In the United Kingdom, many major periodicals, academic institutions, and large companies have their own style guides; otherwise, they normally rely on New Hart's Rules, available in the New Oxford Style Manual.

=== For general writing ===
- Rules for Compositors and Readers at the University Press, Oxford (1893), more commonly known as Hart's Rules. First edition circulated privately. Fifteenth edition (first for publication): 1904. Thirty-ninth (final) edition: 1983. Later editions published under new format under the title New Hart's Rules; see entry below for New Oxford Style Manual.
- The King's English (1906), by H. W. Fowler and Francis George Fowler. Third (final) edition: 1931.
- Author & Printer: A Guide for Authors, Editors, Printers, Correctors of the Press, Compositors, and Typists; With full list of Abbreviations; An Attempt to codify the best Typographical Practices of the Present Day (March 1905), by F. Howard Collins. Reprinted under its more familiar title, Authors' and Printers' Dictionary, in 1909.
- A Dictionary of Modern English Usage (1926), by H. W. Fowler. Second edition, edited by Sir Ernest Gowers: Fowler's Modern English Usage (1965). Third edition, edited by Robert Burchfield: New Fowler's Modern English Usage (1996). Fourth (latest) edition: Fowler's Dictionary of Modern English Usage, edited by Jeremy Butterfield (2015). Oxford: Oxford University Press. ISBN 9780199661350
- The Complete Plain Words (1954), by Sir Ernest Gowers. An amalgamation of the author's Plain Words: A Guide to the Use of English (1948) and his ABC of Plain Words (1951). The first edition of 1954 was published to popular acclaim; a second edition, revised by Sir Bruce Fraser, was published in 1973 and was also warmly received for its wit and charm. The latest (fourth) edition, edited by Gowers' great-granddaughter Rebecca Gowers, was published in 2014.
- Copy-editing: The Cambridge Handbook (1975), by Judith Butcher. Fourth (final) edition: Copy-editing: The Cambridge Handbook for Editors, Copy-editors and Proofreaders. Cambridge: Cambridge University Press. ISBN 9780521847131
- New Oxford Style Manual (2016 ed.) Oxford: Oxford University Press. Combining New Hart's Rules and The Oxford Dictionary for Writers and Editors, it is an authoritative handbook on how to prepare copy. ISBN 9780198767251
- Usage and Abusage: A Guide to Good English (1948), by Eric Partridge.

=== For legal documents ===
- Oxford Standard for Citation of Legal Authorities (OSCOLA), by the University of Oxford Faculty of Law
- The Lawyer's Style Guide (2021 ed.) by Bloomsbury Publishing

=== For academic papers ===
- MHRA Style Guide for the arts and humanities; published by the Modern Humanities Research Association
- The British Psychological Society Style Guide, published by The British Psychological Society

=== For journalism ===
- The BBC News Style Guide: by the British Broadcasting Corporation
- The Daily Telegraph Style Guide, by The Daily Telegraph
- The Economist Style Guide by The Economist.
- The Financial Times Style Guide, by the Financial Times
- The Guardian Style Guide, by The Guardian
- The Times Style and Usage Guide, by The Times

=== For electronic publishing ===
- GOV.UK Style Guide, by UK Government
- University of Cambridge Style Guide, by University of Cambridge

=== For the computer industry (software and hardware) ===
- Acorn Technical Publications Style Guide, by Acorn Computers. Provides editorial guidelines for text in RISC OS instructional publications, technical documentation, and reference information.
- RISC OS Style Guide by RISC OS Open Limited. Provides design guidelines, help and dialogue box phrasing examples for the software user interface.

== United States ==
In the United States, most journalistic forms of mass communication rely on styles provided in the Associated Press Stylebook (AP Stylebook). Corporate publications typically follow either the AP Stylebook or the equally respected Chicago Manual of Style, with in-house modifications or exceptions to the chosen style guide.

A classic grammar style guide is Strunk & White's Elements of Style.

=== For general writing ===
- Bryson's Dictionary of Troublesome Words: A Writer's Guide to Getting It Right, by Bill Bryson
- The Careful Writer, by Theodore Bernstein
- The Conscious Style Guide: A Flexible Approach to Language That Includes, Respects, and Empowers, by Karen Yin — provides "style guidance on compassionate, mindful, empowering, respectful, and inclusive language," particularly with regards to marginalized communities
- Garner's Modern American Usage, by Bryan A. Garner
- The Elements of Style, by William Strunk, Jr. and E. B. White — often referred to as "Strunk & White"

=== For legal documents ===
- ALWD Guide to Legal Citation, by the Association of Legal Writing Directors
- The Bluebook: A Uniform System of Citation, by the Harvard Law Review, Yale Law Journal, Columbia Law Review, and Penn Law Review in collaboration
- The Indigo Book: An Open and Compatible Implementation of A Uniform System of Citation, by Professor Christopher Jon Sprigman and NYU law students — unofficial open-source adaptation of the Bluebook
- New York Law Reports Style Manual, by the Law Reporting Bureau of the State of New York

=== For scientific publications ===
- The ACS Guide to Scholarly Communication, by the American Chemical Society
- AMA Manual of Style: A Guide for Authors and Editors, by the Journal of the American Medical Association (JAMA)
- AMS Style Guide – Journals, by the American Mathematical Society (AMS)
- The American Sociological Association Style Guide, by the American Sociological Association
- The CSE Manual: Scientific Style and Format for Authors, Editors, and Publishers, by the Council of Science Editors (CSE)
- IEEE Reference Style Guide for Authors, by the Institute of Electrical and Electronics Engineers (IEEE)
- Publication Manual of the American Psychological Association, by the American Psychological Association — known as "APA style"

=== For other academic writing ===
- Association of Art Editors Style Guide, by Lory Frankel and Virginia Wageman for the Association of Art Editors
- The Chicago Manual of Style, by the University of Chicago Press
  - A Manual for Writers of Research Papers, Theses, and Dissertations: Chicago Style for Students and Researchers, by Kate L. Turabian — often referred to as "Turabian"
- Handbook of Technical Writing, by Gerald J. Alred, Charles T. Brusaw, and Walter E. Oliu
- The Little Style Guide to Great Christian Writing and Publishing, by Leonard G. Goss and Carolyn Stanford Goss — provides a distinctively religious examination of style and language for writers and editors in religion, philosophy of religion, and theology
- MHRA Style Guide: A Handbook for Authors, Editors, and Writers of Theses, by the Modern Humanities Research Association (MHRA)
- MLA Handbook for Writers of Research Papers, by Joseph Gibaldi for the Modern Language Association of America (MLA)
- The SBL Handbook of Style: For Biblical Studies and Related Disciplines, by the Society of Biblical Literature (SBL)
- The Style Manual for Political Science, by the American Political Science Association

=== For journalism ===
- The Associated Press Stylebook, by the Associated Press — known as the AP Stylebook
- The BuzzFeed Style Guide, by Emmy Favilla and Megan Paolone
- GLAAD Media Reference Guide, by GLAAD — provides guidance for writing about LGBTQ people in journalism and media
- The New York Times Manual of Style and Usage, by Allan M. Siegal and William G. Connolly
- The Wall Street Journal Guide to Business Style and Usage, by Ronald J. Alsop and the staff of the Wall Street Journal

=== For electronic publishing ===
- The Columbia Guide to Online Style, by Janice Walker and Todd Taylor
- Web Style Guide: Basic Design Principles for Creating Web Sites, by Patrick J. Lynch and Sarah Horton
- The Yahoo! Style Guide, by Chris Barr

=== For business ===
- The Business Style Handbook: An A-to-Z Guide for Effective Writing on the Job, by Helen Cunningham and Brenda Greene
- The Gregg Reference Manual, by William A. Sabin

=== For the computer industry ===
- Apple Style Guide, published online by Apple Inc. — provides editorial guidelines for text in Apple instructional publications, technical documentation, reference information, training programs, and the software user interface
- DigitalOcean Style Guide, published online by DigitalOcean
- GNOME Developer Documentation Style Guidelines, published online by GNOME
- Google Developer Documentation Style Guide, published online by Google — provides a set of editorial guidelines for anyone writing developer documentation for Google-related projects
- The IBM Style Guide: Conventions for Writers and Editors, by Francis DeRespinis, Peter Hayward, Jana Jenkins, Amy Laird, Leslie McDonald, and Eric Radzinski for IBM Press
- Developing Quality Technical Information: A Handbook for Writers and Editors, by Michelle Carey, Moira McFadden Lanyi, Deirdre Longo, Eric Radzinski, Shannon Rouiller and Elizabeth Wilde for IBM Press
- Mailchimp Content Style Guide, published online by Mailchimp
- Microsoft Writing Style Guide, published online by the Microsoft Corporation
- MongoDB Documentation Style Guide, published by MongoDB
- Mozilla Writing Style Guide, published online by Mozilla
- Read Me First!: A Style Guide for the Computer Industry, by Sun Technical Publications
- Red Hat Technical Writing Style Guide, published online by Red Hat
- Salesforce Style Guide for Documentation and User Interface Text, published online by Salesforce
- The Splunk Style Guide, published online by Splunk
- SUSE Documentation Style Guide, published online by SUSE
- Wired Style: Principles of English Usage in the Digital Age, by Constance Hale and Jessie Scanlon for Wired

=== Editorial style guides on preparing a manuscript for publication ===
- The Chicago Manual of Style, by the University of Chicago Press
- Words into Type, by Marjorie E. Skillin and Robert M. Gay

== See also ==
- Citation
- Diction
- Documentation
- Disputed usage
- English writing style
- Grammar
- Linguistic prescription
- Punctuation
- Sentence spacing in language and style guides
- Spelling
- Stylistics
