= Serial comma =

Comma before the conjunction in a list

The serial comma (also referred to as the Oxford comma or Harvard comma) is a comma placed after the penultimate term in a list (just before the conjunction) when writing out three or more terms. For example, a list of three countries might be punctuated with the serial comma as "France, Italy, and Spain" or without it as "France, Italy and Spain". The serial comma can help avoid ambiguity in some situations, but can also create it in others. There is no universally accepted standard for its use.

The serial comma is popular in formal writing (such as in academic, literary, and legal contexts) but is usually omitted in journalism as a way to save space. Its popularity in informal and semi-formal writing depends on the variety of English; it is usually excluded in British English, while in American English it is common and often considered mandatory outside journalism. Academic and legal style guides such as the APA style, The Chicago Manual of Style, Garner's Modern American Usage, Strunk and White's The Elements of Style, and the U.S. Government Printing Office Style Manual either recommend or require the serial comma, as does The Oxford Style Manual (hence the alternative name "Oxford comma"). Newspaper stylebooks such as the Associated Press Stylebook, The New York Times Style Book and The Canadian Press stylebook typically recommend against it. Most British style guides do not require it, with The Economist Style Guide noting most British writers use it only to avoid ambiguity.

While many sources provide default recommendations on whether to use the serial comma as a matter of course, most also include exceptions for situations where it is necessary to avoid ambiguity or confusion (see Serial comma § Recommendations by style guides).

== History ==
The comma itself is widely attributed to Aldus Manutius, a 15th-century Italian printer who used a mark—now recognized as a comma—to separate words. Etymologically, the word comma, which became widely used to describe Manutius's mark, comes from the Greek κόμμα (lit. 'to cut off'). The serial comma has been used for centuries in a variety of languages, though not necessarily in a uniform or regulated manner.

The serial comma is most often attributed to Horace Hart, the printer and controller of the Oxford University Press from 1893 to 1915. Hart wrote the eponymous Hart's Rules for Compositors and Readers in 1905 as a style guide for the employees working at the press. The guide called for the use of the serial comma, but the punctuation mark had no distinct name until 1978, when Peter Sutcliffe referred to the serial comma as such in his historical account of the Oxford University Press.

Sutcliffe, however, attributed the serial comma not to Horace Hart but to F. Howard Collins, who mentioned it in his 1905 book, Author & Printer: A Guide for Authors, Editors, Printers, Correctors of the Press, Compositors, and Typists.

== Arguments for and against ==
Common arguments for the consistent use of the serial comma are:

- The comma's use is standard in most non-journalistic writing, and even journalism style guides that generally omit it, such as The AP Stylebook, still require it in complex series or when an item in the list already contains a conjunction, to avoid ambiguity.
- The comma's use is consistent with the conventional practice in some regions and style traditions.
- It can resolve ambiguity (see examples below).
- Its use is consistent with other means of separating items in a list (for example, when semicolons are used to separate items, one is always included before the last item).

Common arguments against the consistent use of the serial comma are:

- The comma's omission is the default convention in most American journalism, including The AP Stylebook, for simple series, primarily as a space-saving measure.
- The comma's omission is consistent with the conventional practice in other regions and style traditions.
- It can introduce ambiguity.
- When space is at a premium, it adds redundancy and unnecessary bulk to the text.

Many sources are against both systematic use and systematic avoidance of the serial comma, making recommendations in a more nuanced way as reflected in recommendations by style guides.

== Ambiguity ==
Omitting the serial comma may create ambiguity; writers who normally avoid the comma often use one to avoid this. Consider the apocryphal book dedication below:

To my parents, Mother Teresa and the pope.

There is ambiguity about the writer's parentage as "Mother Teresa and the pope" can be read as an appositive phrase renaming of my parents, leading the reader to believe that the writer claims that Mother Teresa and the pope are their parents. A comma before the and removes the ambiguity:

To my parents, Mother Teresa, and the pope.

Nevertheless, lists can also be written in other ways that eliminate the ambiguity without introducing the serial comma, such as by changing the word order, or by using other or no punctuation to introduce or delimit them (though the emphasis may thereby be changed):

To the pope, Mother Teresa and my parents.

An example collected by Nielsen Hayden was found in a newspaper account of a documentary about Merle Haggard:

Among those interviewed were his two ex-wives, Kris Kristofferson and Robert Duvall.

A serial comma following "Kris Kristofferson" would help prevent this being understood as Kris Kristofferson and Robert Duvall being the ex-wives in question.

In some circumstances, using the serial comma can create ambiguity. If the book dedication above is changed to

To my mother, Mother Teresa, and the pope.

the comma after Mother Teresa creates ambiguity because it can be read as an appositive phrase implying that the writer's mother is Mother Teresa. This leaves it unclear whether this is a list of three entities (1, my mother; 2, Mother Teresa; and 3, the pope) or of only two entities (1, my mother, who is Mother Teresa; and 2, the pope).

The Times once published an unintentionally humorous description of a Peter Ustinov documentary, noting that "highlights of his global tour include encounters with Nelson Mandela, an 800-year-old demigod and a dildo collector". Again, there is ambiguity as to whether the sentence refers to three distinct entities, or whether Mandela is being described as both a demigod and a dildo collector. The addition of a serial comma would not resolve the issue, as he could still be mistaken for a demigod, although he would be precluded from being a dildo collector.

Or consider:

They went to Oregon with Betty, a maid, and a cook.

This is ambiguous because it is unclear whether "a maid" is an appositive renaming of Betty or the second in a list of three people. On the other hand, removing the final comma:

They went to Oregon with Betty, a maid and a cook.

leaves the possibility that Betty is both a maid and a cook (with "a maid and a cook" read as an appositive phrase). In this case, neither the serial-comma style—nor the no-serial-comma style—resolves the ambiguity. A writer who intends a list of three distinct people (Betty, maid, cook) may create an ambiguous sentence, regardless of whether the serial comma is adopted. Furthermore, if the reader is unaware of which convention is being used, both styles can be ambiguous in cases such as this.

These forms (among others) would remove the ambiguity:

- One person
  - They went to Oregon with Betty, who was a maid and a cook.
  - They went to Oregon with Betty, both a maid and a cook.
  - They went to Oregon with Betty (a maid and cook).
  - They went to Oregon with Betty, their maid and cook.
- Two people
  - They went to Oregon with Betty (a maid) and a cook.
  - They went to Oregon with Betty—a maid—and a cook.
  - They went to Oregon with Betty, a maid, and with a cook.
  - They went to Oregon with the maid Betty and a cook.
  - They went to Oregon with a cook and Betty, a maid.
- Three people
  - They went to Oregon with Betty, as well as a maid and a cook.
  - They went to Oregon with Betty and a maid and a cook.
  - They went to Oregon with Betty, one maid and a cook.
  - They went to Oregon with a maid, a cook, and Betty.
  - They went to Oregon with a maid, a cook and Betty.
  - They went with Betty to Oregon with a maid and a cook.

=== In general ===
- The list x, y and z is unambiguous if y and z cannot be read as a renaming of x.
- Equally, x, y, and z is unambiguous if y cannot be read as a renaming of x.
- If neither y nor y and z can be read as a renaming of x, then both forms of the list are unambiguous, but if both y and y and z can be read as a renaming of x, then both forms of the list are ambiguous.
- x and y and z is unambiguous if x and y and y and z cannot both be grouped.

Ambiguities can often be resolved by the selective use of semicolons instead of commas when more separation is required. General practice across style guides involves using semicolons when individual items have their own punctuation or coordinating conjunctions, but typically a "serial semicolon" is required.

== Recommendations by English style guides ==
Lynne Truss writes: "There are people who embrace the Oxford comma, and people who don't, and I'll just say this: never get between these people when drink has been taken."

Omitting a serial comma is often characterized as a journalistic style of writing, as contrasted with a more academic or formal style. Journalists typically do not use the comma, possibly for economy of space. In Australia and Canada, the comma is typically avoided in non-academic publications unless its absence produces ambiguity.

It is important that the serial comma's usage within a document be consistent; inconsistent usage can seem unprofessional.

=== Mainly American style guides supporting mandatory or typical use ===
The United States Government Printing Office's Style Manual
"After each member within a series of three or more words, phrases, letters, or figures used with and, or, or nor." It notes that an age ("70 years 11 months 6 days") is not a series and should not take commas.
Wilson Follett's Modern American Usage: A Guide (Random House, 1981), pp. 397–401
"What, then, are the arguments for omitting the last comma? Only one is cogent – the saving of space. In the narrow width of a newspaper column this saving counts for more than elsewhere, which is why the omission is so nearly universal in journalism. But here or anywhere one must question whether the advantage outweighs the confusion caused by the omission. … The recommendation here is that [writers] use the comma between all members of a series, including the last two, on the common-sense ground that to do so will preclude ambiguities and annoyances at a negligible cost."
The Chicago Manual of Style, 16th edition (University of Chicago Press, 2010), paragraph 6.18
"When a conjunction joins the last two elements in a series of three or more, a comma … should appear before the conjunction. Chicago strongly recommends this widely practiced usage." In answer to a reader's query, The Chicago Manual of Style Online notes that their style guide has been recommending use of the serial comma ever since the first edition in 1906, but also qualifies this, saying "the serial comma is optional; some mainstream style guides (such as the Associated Press) don't use it. … there are times when using the comma (or omitting it) results in ambiguity, which is why it's best to stay flexible."
The Elements of Style (Strunk and White, 4th edition 1999), Rule 2
"In a series of three or more terms with a single conjunction, use a comma after each term except the last." This has been recommended in The Elements of Style since the first edition by Strunk in 1918.
The American Medical Association Manual of Style, 9th edition (1998) Chapter 6.2.1
"Use a comma before the conjunction that precedes the last term in a series."
The Publication Manual of the American Psychological Association, 6th edition (2010) Chapter 4.03
"Use a comma between elements (including before and and or) in a series of three or more items."
The CSE Manual for Authors, Editors, and Publishers (Council of Science Editors, 7th edition, 2006), Section 5.3.3.1
"To separate the elements (words, phrases, clauses) of a simple series of more than 2 elements, including a comma before the closing 'and' or 'or' (the so-called serial comma). Routine use of the serial comma helps to prevent ambiguity."
Garner's Modern English Usage, 4th edition (Oxford University Press, 2016), "Punctuation," § D, "Comma", p. 748
"Whether to include the serial comma has sparked many arguments. But it's easily answered in favor of inclusion because omitting the final comma may cause ambiguities, whereas including it never will – e.g.: 'A and B, C and D, E and F[,] and G and H'."
MLA Style Manual and Guide to Scholarly Publishing (Modern Language Association 2008), paragraph 3.4.2.b
"Use commas to separate words, phrases, and clauses in a series."
AAMT Book of Style for Medical Transcription
"Medical transcriptionists use the serial comma when two medications or diagnoses must be seen as separate; i.e., for 'The patient was on Aspirin, Coversyl, and Dilaudid', the comma is used before 'and' to avoid the reader erroneously thinking that Coversyl and Dilaudid must be taken together."
AIP Style Manual, American Institute of Physics, fourth edition, 1990
"A comma goes before 'and' or 'or' in a series of three or more: Sn, K, Na, and Li lines are invisible."
Plain English Handbook, Revised Edition (McCormick-Mathers Publishing Co., 1959), § 483, p. 78
"Use commas to separate the items in a series of words, phrases, or short clauses:
The farmer sold corn, hay, oats, potatoes, and wheat."

=== Mainly American style guides opposing typical use ===
The New York Times stylebook
"In general, do not use a comma before and or or in a series: The snow stalled cars, buses and trains.
The AP Stylebook
"Use commas to separate elements in a series, but do not put a comma before the conjunction in a simple series. […] Put a comma before the concluding conjunction in a series, however, if an integral element of the series requires a conjunction: I had orange juice, toast, and ham and eggs for breakfast. Use a comma also before the concluding conjunction in a complex series of phrases: The main points to consider are whether the athletes are skillful enough to compete, whether they have the stamina to endure the training, and whether they have the proper mental attitude. In the United States, the choice is between journalistic style (no serial comma) and "literary" style (with serial comma); consistent use of the serial comma is usually recommended for college writing."

=== Mainly British style guides supporting mandatory or typical use ===
MHRA Style Guide (Modern Humanities Research Association), 4th edition (2024)
"In an enumeration of three or more items, the practice in MHRA journals is to insert commas after all but the last item, to give equal weight to each enumerated element … The conjunctions and and or without a preceding comma are understood as linking the parts of a single enumerated element"
However, a note on page 9 states: "The comma after the penultimate item may be omitted in books published by the MHRA, as long as the sense is clear."

=== Mainly British style guides opposing typical use ===
The Times style manual
"Avoid the so-called Oxford comma; say 'he ate bread, butter and jam' rather than 'he ate bread, butter, and jam'."
The Economist Style Guide
"Do not put a comma before and at the end of a sequence of items unless one of the items includes another and. Thus 'The doctor suggested an aspirin, half a grapefruit and a cup of broth. But he ordered scrambled eggs, whisky and soda, and a selection from the trolley.'"
"Sometimes it is essential: compare 'I dedicate this book to my parents, Martin Amis, and JK Rowling' with 'I dedicate this book to my parents, Martin Amis and JK Rowling'."

=== Mainly British style guides that consider it generally unnecessary but discretionary ===
The Guardian Style Guide
"A comma before the final 'and' in lists: straightforward ones (he ate ham, eggs and chips) do not need one, but sometimes it can help the reader (he ate cereal, kippers, bacon, eggs, toast and marmalade, and tea)."
The Cambridge Guide to English Usage
"In British practice there's an Oxford/Cambridge divide … In Canada and Australia the serial comma is recommended only to prevent ambiguity or misreading."
Fowler's Dictionary of Modern English Usage, 4th edition, 2015
"The so-called 'Oxford comma' is an optional comma that follows the penultimate item in a list of three or more items and precedes the word 'and' … The general rule is that it should be used consistently or not at all … However, the Oxford comma can help to avoid ambiguity, ... and it is sometimes helpful to the reader to use an isolated serial comma for clarification, even when the convention has not been adopted in the rest of the text."
New Hart's Rules, 2014
"The general rule is that one style or the other should be used consistently. However, the last comma can serve to resolve ambiguity, particularly when any of the items are compound terms joined by a conjunction, and it is sometimes helpful to the reader to use an isolated serial comma for clarification even when the convention has not been adopted in the rest of the text."

=== Australian style guides opposing typical use ===
The Australian Government Publishing Service's Style Manual for Authors, Editors and Printers
"A comma is used before and, or, or etc. in a list when its omission might either give rise to ambiguity or cause the last word or phrase to be construed with a preposition in the preceding phrase. … Generally, however, a comma is not used before and, or or etc. in a list."

=== Canadian style guides opposing typical use ===
Public Works and Government Services Canada Translation Bureau's The Canadian Style: A Guide to Writing and Editing

Items in a series may be separated by commas:
Complacency, urbanity, sentimentality, whimsicality
They may also be linked by coordinating conjunctions such as and or or:
economists, sociologists or political scientists
the good, the bad and the ugly
Opinions differ on whether and when a comma should be inserted before the final and or or in a sequence. In keeping with the general trend toward less punctuation, the final comma is best omitted where clarity permits, unless there is a need to emphasize the last element in a series.

== Other languages ==
=== Dutch ===
In both Netherlandic and Belgian Dutch, the serial comma is not generally used unless needed to remove ambiguity.

=== German ===
The serial comma does not exist in German when listing items.

=== Japanese ===
The serial comma does not exist in standard Japanese writing. Although it is technically possible to imitate it by writing a list such as 母、父、と私 ("mum, dad, and me"), this is not considered natural. In Japanese, list items are typically connected either with the particle と ("and") throughout or separated simply by commas, as in 母と父と私 or 母、父、私.

=== Spanish ===
The serial comma is proscribed in Spanish. The Royal Spanish Academy explains that, in general, use of the comma is incompatible with the conjunctions y (and), e (and), ni (nor), o (or), and u (or) when they separate elements in the same series or syntactically equivalent members within a statement.

A few exceptions are warranted: a) before the last element of a list of complex elements separated with a semicolon: A; B; C, and D; b) when the last member is linked with the whole previous clause and not the previous coordinated element — and thus there is an and after another and; c) when the last member of a sentence is semantically heterogeneous from the previous ones and thus indicates a conclusion or consequence — with a similar meaning to so; d) it can also be used — but is not mandatory — when two coordinated clauses are very long and especially when they have different subjects; e) when it equals the conjunction but; f) after the closure of an interpolated clause; g) when, rather than being part of a list, it actually introduces an interpolated clause explaining the previous element; h) it can either be repeated or not used when the conjunction and is repeated in a long list, creating a polysyndeton: A[,] and B[,] and C[,] and D....

=== Vietnamese ===
In Vietnamese, the serial comma is commonplace because the conjunction và (and) is routinely omitted from lists. As in English, comma omission can cause drastic changes in sentence meaning.

== Individual disputes ==
=== Maine labor dispute ===
In the U.S. state of Maine, the lack of a serial comma became the deciding factor in a $13 million lawsuit filed in 2014 that was eventually settled for $5 million in 2017. The U.S. appeals judge David J. Barron wrote, "For want of a comma, we have this case."

In O'Connor v. Oakhurst Dairy, a federal court of appeals was required to interpret a statute under which the "canning, processing, preserving, freezing, drying, marketing, storing, packing for shipment or distribution" of certain goods were activities exempted from the general requirement of overtime pay. The question was whether this list included the distribution of the goods, or only the packing of the goods for distribution. The lack of a comma suggested one meaning, while the omission of the conjunction or before "packing" and the fact that the Maine Legislative Drafting Manual advised against use of the serial comma suggested another. It said "Although authorities on punctuation may differ, when drafting Maine law or rules, don't use a comma between the penultimate and the last item of a series." In addition to the absence of a comma, the fact that the word chosen was "distribution" rather than "distributing" was also a consideration, as was the question of whether it would be reasonable to consider the list to be an asyndetic list. Truck drivers demanded overtime pay; the defense conceded that the expression was ambiguous but said it should be interpreted as exempting distribution activity from overtime pay. The district court agreed with the defense and held that "distribution" was an exempt activity. On appeal, however, the First Circuit decided that the sentence was ambiguous and "because, under Maine law, ambiguities in the state's wage and hour laws must be construed liberally in order to accomplish their remedial purpose", adopted the drivers' narrower reading of the exemption and ruled that those who distributed the goods were entitled to overtime pay. Oakhurst Dairy settled the case by paying $5 million to the drivers, and the phrase in the law in question was later changed to use serial semicolons and "distributing" – resulting in "canning; processing; preserving; freezing; drying; marketing; storing; packing for shipment; or distributing".

The opinion in the case said that 43 of the 50 U.S. states had mandated the use of a serial comma and that both chambers of the federal congress had warned against omitting it, in the words of the U.S. House Legislative Counsel's Manual on Drafting Style, "to prevent any misreading that the last item is part of the preceding one"; only seven states "either do not require or expressly prohibited the use of the serial comma".

=== British 50p Brexit coin ===
In 2020, a commemorative 50p coin was brought into circulation in the United Kingdom to mark "Brexit day", January 31, 2020, minted with the phrase "Peace, prosperity and friendship with all nations". English novelist Philip Pullman and others criticized the omission of the serial comma, while others said it was an Americanism and not required in this instance.

== See also ==
- Roger Casement, "hanged on a comma" due to contested non-punctuation in a law
- "Oxford Comma", a 2008 song by Vampire Weekend which begins "Who gives a fuck about an Oxford comma?"
- Syndeton, the conjunctive phrasing that may or may not contain a serial comma
