= Quotation marks in English =

Usage of punctuation

“ ”o

Double typographic quotes
| ‘ ’ | " " | ' ' |
| Single typographic quotes | Neutral double quotes | Neutral single quotes |

In English writing, quotation marks or inverted commas, also known informally as quotes, talking marks, speech marks, quote marks, quotemarks or speechmarks, are punctuation marks placed on either side of a word or phrase in order to identify it as a quotation, direct speech or a literal title or name. Quotation marks may be used to indicate that the meaning of the word or phrase they surround should be taken to be different from (or, at least, a modification of) that typically associated with it, and are often used in this way to express irony (for example, in the sentence "The lunch man plopped a glob of 'food' onto my tray." the quotation marks around the word food show it is being called that ironically). They are also sometimes used to emphasize a word or phrase, although this is usually considered incorrect.

Quotation marks are written as a pair of opening and closing marks in either of two styles: single (‘...’) or double (“...”). Opening and closing quotation marks may be identical in form (called neutral, vertical, straight, typewriter, or "dumb" quotation marks), or may be distinctly left-handed and right-handed (typographic or, colloquially, curly quotation marks);. Typographic quotation marks are usually used in manuscript and typeset text. Because typewriter and computer keyboards lack keys to directly enter typographic quotation marks, much of typed writing has neutral quotation marks. Some computer software has the feature often called "smart quotes" which can, sometimes imperfectly, convert neutral quotation marks to typographic ones.

The typographic closing double quotation mark and the neutral double quotation mark are similar to – and sometimes stand in for – the ditto mark and the double prime symbol. Likewise, the typographic opening single quotation mark is sometimes used to represent the ʻokina while either the typographic closing single quotation mark or the neutral single quotation mark may represent the prime symbol. Characters with different meanings are typically given different visual appearance in typefaces that recognize these distinctions, and they each have different Unicode code points. Despite being semantically different, the typographic closing single quotation mark and the typographic apostrophe have the same visual appearance and code point (U+2019), as do the neutral single quote and typewriter apostrophe (U+0027). (Despite the different code points, the curved and straight versions are sometimes considered multiple glyphs of the same character.)

== History ==
In the first centuries of typesetting, quotations were distinguished merely by indicating the speaker, and this can still be seen in some editions of the Christian Bible. During the Renaissance, quotations were distinguished by setting in a typeface contrasting with the main body text (often italic type vs roman). Long quotations were also set this way, at full size and full measure.

Quotation marks were first cut in metal type during the middle of the sixteenth century, and were used copiously by some printers by the seventeenth. In some Baroque and Romantic-period books, they would be repeated at the beginning of every line of a long quotation. When this practice was abandoned, the empty margin remained, leaving the modern form of indented block quotation.

In Early Modern English, quotation marks were used to denote pithy comments. They were used to quote direct speech as early as the late sixteenth century, and this practice became more common over time.

== Usage ==
=== Quotations and speech ===
Single or double quotation marks denote either speech or a quotation. Double quotes are preferred in the United States and Canada. In Australia, double quotes are preferred for indicating speech, except in the government and corporate sectors, where the preference is for single quotes. Single quotes are more usual in the United Kingdom, Ireland and South Africa, though double quotes are also common there, especially in journalistic works. In New Zealand, both styles are used.

A publisher's or author's style may take precedence over regional general preferences. The important idea is that the style of opening and closing quotation marks must be matched:

'Good morning, Frank,' said Hal.
"Good morning, Frank," said Hal.

For speech within speech, the other style is used as inner quotation marks:

'Hal said, "Good morning, Dave,"' recalled Frank.
"Hal said, 'Good morning, Dave,'" recalled Frank.

Sometimes quotations are nested in more levels than inner and outer quotation. In these cases, questions arise about the form (and names) of the quotation marks to be used. The most common way is to simply alternate between the two forms, thus:

" ... ' ... " ... ' ... ' ... " ... ' ... "

If such a passage is further quoted in another publication, then all of their forms have to be shifted up by one level.

In many cases, quotations that span multiple paragraphs are set as block quotations, and thus do not require quotation marks. However, quotation marks are used for multiple-paragraph quotations in some cases, especially in narratives, where the convention in English is to give opening quotation marks to the first and each subsequent paragraph, using closing quotation marks only for the final paragraph of the quotation, as in the following example from Pride and Prejudice:

The letter was to this effect:

"My dear Lizzy,

"I wish you joy. If you love Mr. Darcy half as well as I do my dear Wickham, you must be very happy. It is a great comfort to have you so rich, and when you have nothing else to do, I hope you will think of us. I am sure Wickham would like a place at court very much, and I do not think we shall have quite money enough to live upon without some help. Any place would do, of about three or four hundred a year; but however, do not speak to Mr. Darcy about it, if you had rather not.

"Yours, etc."

When quoted text is interrupted, such as with the phrase he said, a closing quotation mark is used before the interruption, and an opening quotation mark after. Commas are also often used before and after the interruption, more often for quotations of speech than for quotations of text:

"Everything", said Hal, "is going extremely well."

Quotation marks are not used for indirect speech. This is because indirect speech can be a paraphrase; it is not a direct quote, and in the course of any composition, it is important to document when one is using a quotation versus when one is just giving content, which may be paraphrased, and which could be open to interpretation.

For example, if Hal says: "All systems are functional", then, in indirect speech:

Incorrect: Hal said that "everything was going extremely well".
Correct: Hal said that everything was going extremely well.

=== Irony ===
Another common use of quotation marks is to indicate or call attention to ironic, dubious, or non-standard words:

He shared his "wisdom" with me.
The lunch lady plopped a glob of "food" onto my tray.
He complained about too many "gummint" regulations.

Quotes indicating verbal irony, or other special use, are sometimes called scare quotes. They are sometimes gestured in oral speech using air quotes, or indicated in speech with a tone change or by replacement with supposed[ly] or so-called.

=== Signalling unusual usage ===
Quotation marks are also used to indicate that the writer realizes that a word is not being used in its current commonly accepted sense:

Crystals somehow "know" which shape to grow into.

In addition to conveying a neutral attitude and to call attention to a neologism, or slang, or special terminology (also known as jargon), quoting can also indicate words or phrases that are descriptive but unusual, colloquial, folksy, startling, humorous, metaphoric, or contain a pun: Dawkins's concept of a meme could be described as an "evolving idea".

People also use quotation marks in this way to distance the writer from the terminology in question so as not to be associated with it, for example to indicate that a quoted word is not official terminology, or that a quoted phrase presupposes things that the author does not necessarily agree with; or to indicate special terminology that should be identified for accuracy's sake as someone else's terminology, as when a term (particularly a controversial term) pre-dates the writer or represents the views of someone else, perhaps without judgement (contrast this neutrally distancing quoting to the negative use of scare quotes).

The Chicago Manual of Style, 17th edition (2017), acknowledges this type of use but, in section 7.57, cautions against its overuse: "Quotation marks are often used to alert readers that a term is used in a nonstandard (or slang), ironic, or other special sense .... [T]hey imply 'This is not my term,' or 'This is not how the term is usually applied.' Like any such device, scare quotes lose their force and irritate readers if overused."

=== Use–mention distinction ===
Either quotation marks or italic type can emphasise that an instance of a word refers to the word itself rather than its associated concept.

Cheese is derived from milk. (concept)
"Cheese" is derived from a word in Old English. (word)
Cheese has calcium, protein, and phosphorus. (concept)
Cheese has three Es. (word)

==== In linguistics ====
Precise writing about language often uses italics for the word itself and single quotation marks for a gloss, with the two not separated by a comma or other punctuation, and with strictly logical quotation around the gloss – extraneous terminal punctuation outside the quotation marks – even in North American publications, which might otherwise prefer them inside:

Latin ovis 'sheep', canis 'dog', and equus 'horse' are nouns.

=== Titles of artistic works ===
Quotation marks, rather than italics, are generally used for the titles of shorter works. Whether these are single or double depends on the context; however, many styles, especially for poetry, prefer the use of single quotation marks.

- Short fiction, poetry, etc.: Arthur C. Clarke's "The Sentinel"
- Book chapters: The first chapter of 3001: The Final Odyssey is "Comet Cowboy"
- Articles in books, magazines, journals, etc.: "Extra-Terrestrial Relays", Wireless World, October 1945
- Album tracks, singles, etc.: David Bowie's "Space Oddity"

As a rule, the title of a whole publication is italicised (or, in typewritten text, underlined), whereas the titles of minor works within or a subset of the larger publication (such as poems, short stories, named chapters, journal papers, newspaper articles, TV show episodes, video game levels, editorial sections of websites, etc.) are written with quotation marks.

=== Nicknames and false titles ===
Quotation marks can also set off a nickname embedded in an actual name, or a false or ironic title embedded in an actual title; for example, Nat "King" Cole, Frank "Chairman of the Board" Sinatra, or Simone Rizzo "Sam the Plumber" DeCavalcante.

=== Nonstandard usage ===
Quotes are sometimes used for emphasis in lieu of underlining or italics, most commonly on signs or placards. This usage can be confused with ironic or altered-usage quotation, sometimes with unintended humor. For example, For sale: "fresh" fish, "fresh" oysters, could be construed to imply that fresh is not used with its everyday meaning, or indeed to indicate that the fish or oysters are anything but fresh. As another example, Cashiers' desks open until noon for your "convenience" could be interpreted to mean that the convenience was for the bank employees, not the customers.

== Order of punctuation ==
With regard to quotation marks adjacent to periods and commas, there are two styles of punctuation in widespread use. These two styles are most commonly referred to as "American" and "British", or sometimes "typesetters' quotation" and "logical quotation". Both systems have the same rules regarding question marks, exclamation points, colons, and semicolons. However, they differ in the treatment of periods and commas.

In all major forms of English, question marks, exclamation marks, semicolons, and any other punctuation (with the possible exceptions of periods and commas, as explained in the sections below) are placed inside or outside the closing quotation mark depending on whether they are part of the quoted material.

Did he say, "Good morning, Dave"?
No, he said, "Where are you, Dave?"
There are three major definitions of the word "gender": vernacular, sociological, and linguistic.
Type "C:" at the DOS prompt to switch from a floppy disk to a hard drive.

A convention is the use of square brackets to indicate content between the quotation marks that has been modified from, or was not present in, the original material.

=== British style ===
The prevailing style in the United Kingdom – called British style, logical quotation, and logical punctuation – is to include within quotation marks only those punctuation marks that appeared in the original quoted material and in which the punctuation mark fits with the sense of the quotation, but otherwise to place punctuation outside the closing quotation marks. Fowler's A Dictionary of Modern English Usage provides an early example of the rule: "All signs of punctuation used with words in quotation marks must be placed according to the sense."

When dealing with words-as-words, short-form works and sentence fragments, this style places periods and commas outside the quotation marks:

"Carefree", in general, means "free from care or anxiety".
The title of the song was "Gloria", which many already knew.
She said she felt "free from care and anxiety".

When dealing with direct speech, according to the British style guide Butcher's Copy-editing, if a quotation is broken by words of the main sentence, and then resumed, the punctuation before the break should follow the closing quote unless it forms part of the quotation. An exception may be made when writing fiction, where the first comma may be placed before the first closing quote. In non-fiction, some British publishers may permit placing punctuation that is not part of the person's speech inside the quotation marks but prefer that it be placed outside. Periods and commas that are part of the person's speech are permitted inside the quotation marks regardless of whether the material is fiction.

"Today," said Cinderella, "I feel free from care and anxiety." (fiction)
"Today", said the Prime Minister, "I feel free from care and anxiety." (preferred in non-fiction)
"Today I feel happy," said the woman, "carefree, and well." (regardless)

Hart's Rules and the Oxford Dictionary for Writers and Editors call the British style "new" quoting. It is also similar to the use of quotation marks in many other languages (including Portuguese, Spanish, French, Italian, Catalan, Dutch and German). A few US professional societies whose professions frequently employ various non-word characters, such as chemistry and computer programming, use the British form in their style guides (see ACS Style Guide).

According to the Jargon File from 1983, American hackers (members of a subculture of enthusiastic programmers) switched to what they later discovered to be the British quotation system because placing a period inside a quotation mark can change the meaning of data strings that are meant to be typed character-for-character.

Some American style guides specific to certain specialties also prefer the British style. For example, the journal Language of the Linguistic Society of America requires that the closing quotation mark precede the period or comma unless that period or comma is "a necessary part of the quoted matter". The websites Wikipedia and Pitchfork use logical punctuation.

=== American style ===
In the United States, the prevailing style is called American style, whereby commas and periods are almost always placed inside closing quotation marks. This is done because it results in closer spacing and what is judged to be a cleaner appearance. The American style is used by most newspapers, publishing houses, and style guides in the United States and, to a lesser extent, Canada as well.

When dealing with words-as-words, short-form works, and sentence fragments, standard American style places periods and commas inside the quotation marks:

"Carefree," in general, means "free from care or anxiety."
The title of the song was "Gloria," which many already knew.
She said she felt "free from care and anxiety."

This style also places periods and commas inside the quotation marks when dealing with direct speech, regardless of whether the work is fiction or non-fiction:

"Today," said Cinderella, "I feel free from care and anxiety." (fiction)
"Today," said the Prime Minister, "I feel free from care and anxiety." (non-fiction)

Nevertheless, many American style guides explicitly permit periods and commas outside the quotation marks when the presence of the punctuation mark inside the quotation marks leads to ambiguity, such as when describing keyboard input, as in the following example:

In the programming language Pascal, the statement "end.", including the period, signifies the end of a program.

The American style is recommended by the Modern Language Association's MLA Style Manual, the American Psychological Association's APA Publication Manual, the University of Chicago's The Chicago Manual of Style, the American Institute of Physics's AIP Style Manual, the American Medical Association's AMA Manual of Style, the American Political Science Association's APSA Style Manual, the Associated Press' The AP Guide to Punctuation, and the Canadian Public Works' The Canadian Style. This style is also used in some British news and fiction.

=== Ending the sentence ===
In both major styles, regardless of placement, only one end mark (?, !, or .) can end a sentence. Only the period, however, may not end a quoted sentence when it does not also end the enclosing sentence, except for literal text:

"Hello, world," she said. (both styles)
She said, "Hello, world." (both styles)
"Hello, world!" she exclaimed. (both styles)
"Is anybody out there?" she asked into the void. (both styles)

With narration of direct speech, both styles retain punctuation inside the quotation marks, with a full stop changing into a comma if followed by attributive matter, also known as a speech tag or annunciatory clause.

== Typographical considerations ==
=== Primary quotations versus secondary quotations ===
Primary quotations are orthographically distinguished from secondary quotations that may be nested within a primary quotation. British English often uses single quotation marks to identify the outermost text of a primary quotation versus double quotation marks for inner, nested quotations. By contrast, American English typically uses double quotation marks to identify the outermost text of a primary quotation versus single quotation marks for inner, nested quotations.

British usage does vary, with some authoritative sources such as The Economist and The Times recommending the same usage as in the US, whereas other authoritative sources, such as The King's English, Fowler's, and New Hart's Rules, recommend single quotation marks. In journals and newspapers, whether double or single quotation marks are used often depends on the individual publication's house style.

=== Spacing ===
In English, when a quotation follows other writing on a line of text, a space precedes the opening quotation mark unless the preceding symbol, such as an em dash, requires that there be no space. When a quotation is followed by other writing on a line of text, a space follows the closing quotation mark unless it is immediately followed by other punctuation within the sentence, such as a colon or closing punctuation. (These exceptions are ignored by some Asian computer systems that systematically display quotation marks with the included spacing, as this spacing is part of the fixed-width characters.)

There is generally no space between an opening quotation mark and the following word, or a closing quotation mark and the preceding word. When a double quotation mark or a single quotation mark immediately follows the other, proper spacing for legibility may suggest that a thin space (&thinsp;) or larger non-breaking space (&nbsp;) be inserted.

So Dave actually said, "He said, 'Good morning' "? (thin-space)
Yes, he did say, "He said, 'Good morning.' " (non-breaking space)

This is not common practice in mainstream publishing, which will generally use more precise kerning. It is more common in online writing, although using CSS to create the spacing by kerning is more semantically appropriate in Web typography than inserting extraneous spacing characters.

=== Non-language-related usage ===
Straight quotation marks (or italicised straight quotation marks) are often used to approximate the prime and double prime, e.g. when signifying feet and inches or arcminutes and arcseconds. For instance, 5 feet and 6 inches is often written 5' 6"; and 40 degrees, 20 arcminutes, and 50 arcseconds is written 40° 20' 50". When available, however, primes should be used instead (e.g. 5′ 6″, and 40° 20′ 50″). Prime and double prime are not present in most code pages, including ASCII and Latin-1, but are present in Unicode, as characters U+2032 ′ PRIME and U+2033 ″ DOUBLE PRIME. The HTML character entity references are &prime; and &Prime;, respectively.

Double quotation marks, or pairs of single ones, also represent the ditto mark.

Straight single and double quotation marks are used in most programming languages to delimit strings or literal characters, collectively known as string literals. In some languages (e.g. Pascal) only one type is allowed, in some (e.g. C and its derivatives) both are used with different meanings and in others (e.g. Python) both are used interchangeably. In some languages, if it is desired to include the same quotation marks used to delimit a string inside the string, the quotation marks are doubled. For example, to represent the string eat 'hot' dogs in Pascal one uses 'eat ''hot'' dogs'. Other languages use an escape character, often the backslash, as in 'eat \'hot\' dogs'.

In the TeX typesetting program, left double quotes are produced by typing two back-ticks (``) and right double quotes by typing two apostrophes (''). This is a continuation of a typewriter tradition of using ticks for opening quotation marks; see Quotation mark § Typewriters and early computers.

=== Typing quotation marks on a computer keyboard ===
Standard English computer keyboard layouts inherited the single and double straight quotation marks from the typewriter (the single quotation mark also doubling as an apostrophe), and they do not include individual keys for left-handed and right-handed typographic quotation marks. In character encoding terms, these characters are labeled unidirectional. However, most computer text-editing programs provide a "smart quotes" feature to automatically convert straight quotation marks into bidirectional punctuation, though sometimes imperfectly. Generally, this smart quote feature is enabled by default, and it can be turned off in an "options" or "preferences" dialog. Some websites do not allow typographic quotation marks or apostrophes in posts. One can skirt these limitations, however, by using the HTML character codes or entities or the other key combinations in the following table. In Windows, AutoHotkey scripts can be used to assign simpler key combinations to opening and closing quotation marks.

How to type typographic quotation marks (and apostrophes) on a computer keyboard
| | | Windows Alt code combinations | macOS key combinations | Linux (X) keys | Unicode point | HTML entity | HTML decimal |
|---|---|---|---|---|---|---|---|
| Single opening | ‘ | Alt+0145 (on number pad) | ⌥ Opt+] | Compose+<+' or Alt Gr+⇧ Shift+V | U+2018 | &lsquo; | &#8216; |
| Single closing (and apostrophe) | ’ | Alt+0146 (on number pad) | ⌥ Opt+⇧ Shift+] | Compose+>+' or Alt Gr+⇧ Shift+B | U+2019 | &rsquo; | &#8217; |
| Double opening | “ | Alt+0147 (on number pad) | ⌥ Opt+[ | Compose+<+" or Alt Gr+v | U+201C | &ldquo; | &#8220; |
| Double closing | ” | Alt+0148 (on number pad) | ⌥ Opt+⇧ Shift+[ | Compose+>+" or Alt Gr+b | U+201D | &rdquo; | &#8221; |

==== Smart quotes ====
To make typographic quotation marks easier to enter, publishing software often automatically converts typewriter quotation marks (and apostrophes) to typographic form during text entry (with or without the user being aware of it). Out-of-the-box behavior on macOS, iPadOS and iOS is to make this conversion. These are known as smart quotes (“...”). Straight quotation marks are also retronymically called dumb quotes ("...").

The method for producing smart quotes may be based solely on the character preceding the mark. If it is a space or another of a set of hard-coded characters or if the mark begins a line, the mark will be rendered as an opening quote; if not, it will be rendered as a closing quote or apostrophe. This method can cause errors, especially for contractions that start with an apostrophe or text with nested quotations:

| Text as typed | Desired result | Example erroneous results |
|---|---|---|
| '14 | ’14 | ‘14 |
| I forgot my 'phone. | I forgot my ’phone. | I forgot my ‘phone. |
| 'Twas the night before Christmas ... | ’ Twas the night before Christmas ... | ‘ Twas the night before Christmas ... |
| "'Hello,' he said, 'to you'" | “ ‘Hello,’ he said, ‘to you’ ” | “ ’Hello,’ he said, ‘to you’ ” |

In Windows, if it is necessary to follow a space with a closing quotation mark when smart quotes is in effect, it is usually sufficient to input the character using the Alt code shown above rather than typing " or '.

== See also ==
- Guillemet, a quotation mark used in a number of languages
- International variation in quotation marks
- Modifier letter double apostrophe
- ʻOkina
- Typewriter conventions
- Western Latin character sets (computing)
