= Andrew Gurr =

English literary scholar specialising in Shakespeare and English Renaissance theatre

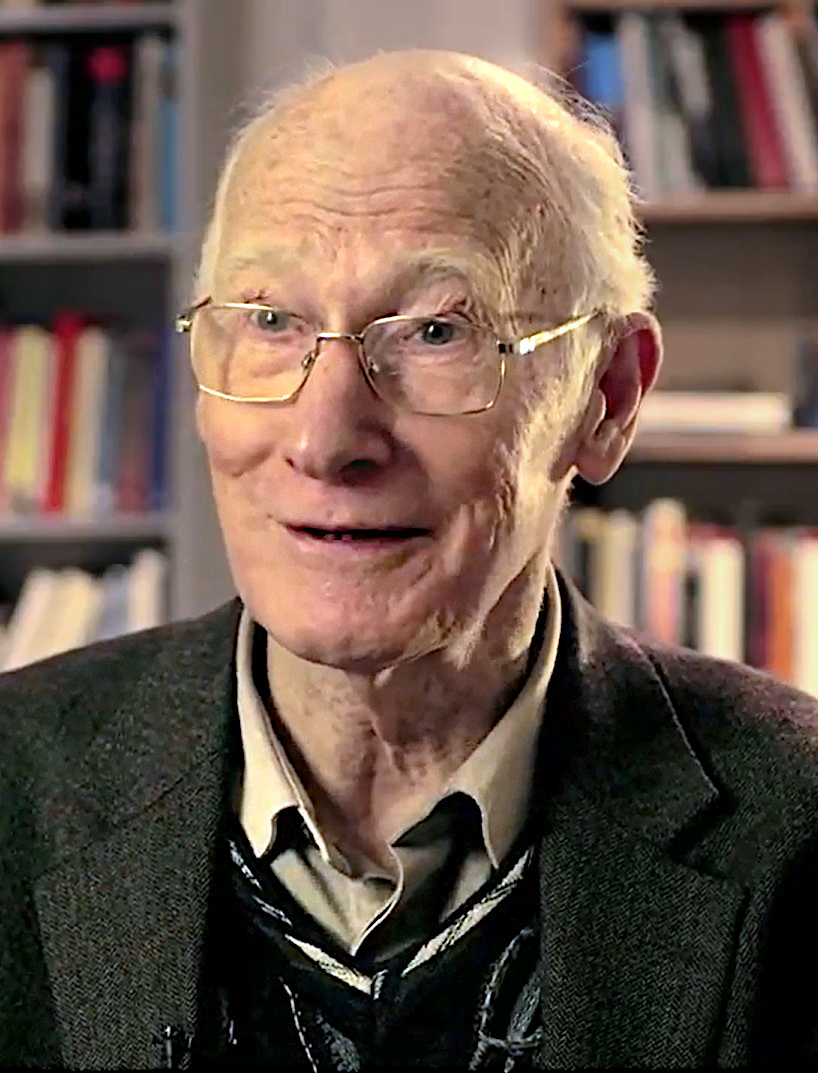
- Andrew Gurr in 2013
- Born: 23 December 1936 (age 89)

Academic work
- Discipline: Literary scholar

Andrew John Gurr (born 23 December 1936) is a contemporary literary scholar who specializes in William Shakespeare and English Renaissance theatre.

== Life and work ==
Born in Leicester, Gurr was raised in New Zealand, and educated at the University of Auckland and at Cambridge University. He has taught at the Universities of Wellington, Leeds, and Nairobi (1969–73); at the latter institution he was also head of his department.

From 1976 until his retirement in 2002 he was professor of English at the University of Reading (head of department, 1979–86), where he taught Shakespeare studies and where he is now Emeritus Professor.

Gurr co-wrote a 1981 study of Katherine Mansfield (with Claire Hanson) and two books on African literature; but he is best known for his books on Shakespeare and his contemporaries, and the theatre of that historical era—books that are recognized and utilized as essential references on English Renaissance drama. He has authored a wide range of articles for both scholarly journals and general-interest periodicals, and has edited several of Shakespeare's plays and several plays in the John Fletcher canon. He was chief academic advisor to the project to rebuild the Globe Theatre in London and also advised on the construction of the Blackfriars Playhouse in Staunton, Virginia, where he has also lectured at the biannual Blackfriars Conference and for Mary Baldwin University's M.Litt/MFA Program. For ten years (1988–97), Gurr was the English editor of the Modern Language Review and also edited The Yearbook of English Studies of the Modern Humanities Research Association, in which roles he was succeeded by Nicola Bradbury.

== Books by Andrew Gurr ==
- Shakespeare's Opposites: The Admiral's Company 1594 - 1625 (2009) Cambridge University Press
- The Shakespeare Company (2004) Cambridge University Press
- The First Quarto of Henry V by William Shakespeare, editor, (2000) Cambridge University Press
- Staging in Shakespeare's Theatres, with Mariko Ichikawa (2000) Oxford University Press
- William Shakespeare: The Extraordinary Life of the Most Successful Writer of All Time (1996) HarperCollins
- The Shakespearean Playing Companies (1996) Clarendon
- The Shakespearean Stage, 1574–1642 (1992) Cambridge University Press
- King Henry V by William Shakespeare, editor, (1992) Cambridge University Press
- Rebuilding Shakespeare's Globe, with John Orrell (1989) Weidenfeld & Nicolson
- Studying Shakespeare: an Introduction (1988) Arnold
- Playgoing in Shakespeare's London (1987) Cambridge University Press
- King Richard II by William Shakespeare, editor, (1984) Cambridge University Press
- Writers in Exile: the Identity of Home in Modern Literature (1981) Harvester Press
- Katherine Mansfield, with Claire Hanson 1981 Macmillan
- Hamlet and the Distracted Globe (1978) Scottish Academic Press (for Sussex University Press)
- Black Aesthetics, editor with Pio Zimiru, (1974) East African Literature Bureau
- Writers in East Africa, with Angus Calder (1973) East African Literature Bureau
- The Maid's Tragedy by Francis Beaumont and John Fletcher, editor, (1969) University of California Press
- Philaster by Beaumont and Fletcher, editor, (1969) Methuen
- The Knight of the Burning Pestle by Francis Beaumont, editor, (1968) University of California Press
