= Nicola Bradbury =

English literary critic, lecturer, editor, and author

Nicola Anne Lulham Bradbury (born 1951) is an English literary critic, lecturer, editor, and author, specializing in the 19th century novel.

== Life ==
Bradbury was born in Weston-super-Mare, the daughter of Robin J. Bradbury and Joan Lulham, who had married in 1949. She was the middle child of a family of three, with an older brother, Peter, and a younger brother, Christopher. She was educated at the University of Oxford and then at McGill, with a Commonwealth Scholarship awarded in 1974. Bradbury later reported that in Canada she "first encountered ‘theory’ and that stood me in good stead at later stages in my career.” She graduated MA from both Oxford and McGill and is also a Doctor of Philosophy of Oxford, with a thesis entitled 'The Process and the Effect: a Study of the Developments of the Novel Form in the Later Work of Henry James'.

By 1989 Bradbury was a lecturer at the University of Reading, and from 1998 to 2005 was a Director of the Modern Humanities Research Association, English Editor for Modern Language Review, and editor of The Yearbook of English Studies, succeeding Andrew Gurr.

Much of her work has focussed on the novelists Henry James and Charles Dickens.

== Selected publications ==
- Henry James: the later novels (Oxford: Clarendon Press, 1979), ISBN 978-0198120964
- Filming James in Essays in Criticism, vol. 29 (1979)
- Henry James, The Portrait of a Lady (Oxford: World's Classics, 1981), ed. Nicola Bradbury, ISBN 978-0192815149
- "'Nothing that is not there and the nothing that is': The Celebration of Absence in The Wings of the Dove", in Ian F. A. Bell, ed., Henry James: Fiction as History (1985)
- An Annotated Critical Bibliography of Henry James (Harvester Press, 1987) ISBN 978-0710810304
- Charles Dickens' Great Expectations (St. Martin's Press, 1990) ISBN 978-0312056582
- Virginia Woolf, To the Lighthouse (Wordsworth Classics, 1994), ed. and introduced Nicola Bradbury, ISBN 978-1853260919
- Charles Dickens, Bleak House, ed. Nicola Bradbury (Harmondsworth: Penguin, 1996)
- The Yearbook of English Studies: vol. 30: 2000: Time and Narrative (W. S. Maney & Son, 1999), edited by Dr. Nicola Bradbury, ISBN 978-1902653051
- Jane Austen, Emma (Wordsworth Classics, 2000), ed. and introduced Nicola Bradbury, ISBN 978-1853260285
- Henry James, The Golden Bowl (Wordsworth Classics, 2000), ed. and introduced Nicola Bradbury, ISBN 978-1840224320
- "Dickens and the form of the novel" in John O. Jordan, ed, The Cambridge Companion to Charles Dickens (2001)
- The Yearbook of English Studies: vol. 31: 2001: North American Short Stories and Short Fictions (2001), edited by Dr Nicola Bradbury
- The Yearbook of English Studies: vol. 32: 2002: Children in Literature (2002), edited by Dr Nicola Bradbury
- Penguin Classics Introduction to Bleak House by Charles Dickens (Penguin Books, 2003)
- The Yearbook of English Studies: vol. 33: 2003: Medieval and Early Modern Miscellanies and Anthologies (2003), edited by Dr Nicola Bradbury
- The Yearbook of English Studies: vol. 34: 2004: Nineteenth Century Travel Writing (2004), edited by Dr Nicola Bradbury
- "Dickens's Use of the Autobiographical Fragment" in David Paroissien, ed., A Companion to Charles Dickens (2008), pp 18–32
- Henry James, The Wings of the Dove (Wordsworth Classics, 2009), ed. and introduced Nicola Bradbury, ISBN 978-1840221817
- Henry James, The Ambassadors (Cambridge University Press: The Cambridge Edition of the Complete Fiction of Henry James, vol. 18, 2015), ed. Nicola Bradbury, ISBN 978-1107002838
