= Flourish =

Flourish may refer to:

- Flourish (film), a 2006 comedic thriller
- Flourish (fanfare), a ceremonial music passage
- Flourishing, the state of positive social functioning
- Flourish of approval, a symbol used for grading and correcting work
- Card flourish, a showy movement of playing cards
- A decorative curl in typography or handwriting, such as a swash

== See also ==
- Floruit ("they flourished"), the period during which a person was known to have been active
