= Dele =

Proofreading symbol to indicate deletion

A dele.

A dele or deleatur (/ˈdiːliː/, /ˌdiːliːˈeɪtər/) is an obelism (a proofreading symbol) used to mark something for deletion.

== Name ==
Dele is the more common term in modern American English, sometimes used as a verb, as in "Dele that graf"), coinciding with the imperative form of the Latin delere ("to delete").

The Oxford English Dictionary notes an earlier use in English of deleatur (Latin "let it be deleted"), suggesting that dele in English might have been an abbreviation for the longer word.

== Origin ==
The origin of the symbol appears to be an archaic letter D in the Kurrent script, as an abbreviation for dele or deleatur.

The symbol is markedly similar (if not identical in some cases) to the symbol for the German penny, which is an archaic lowercase d, for denarius. As with most hand-written letters and symbols, its appearance is variable.

A different theory states simply that it is "a form of 'd' meaning 'delete'".

== Computer representation ==
Version 15.0, from September 2022, of Unicode has no character for the dele symbol.

In 2021, a proposal was submitted (number "L2/21-230") for the addition of the dele symbol to Unicode. The same proposal was resubmitted (number "L2/21-245") a month later with an expanded description to emphasize its usage with other Unicode signs.

== Usage ==
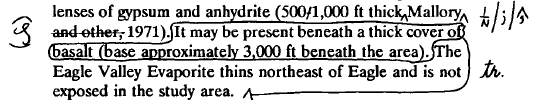
A section of proofread text, with a dele in the left margin indicating the stricken text ("and other,") is to be deleted. (The marks in the right margin mean, from left to right and top to bottom: replace stricken slash with one en dash; insert semicolon; insert comma; and transpose circled text.)

The dele is used in proofreading and copy editing, where it can be written over the selected text itself (such that it often resembles a stretched cursive e), or else in the margin alongside the selected text, which is usually struck through with a line.

The stricken text or the dele itself can be framed by top and bottom curved brackets, as in the above example, to indicate that the space left after deletion is to be closed up. As the need for such closing up can usually be inferred from the context, however, the brackets are often omitted.

A dele can be undone with a stet.

== Symbols similar in appearance ==
In some of its forms, the dele is similar in appearance to:

- The German penny symbol, ₰
- The flourish of approval

In the form "used by ISO and BS", the dele is somewhat similar in appearance to the percent sign, but missing its lower bulb.

In a third form, the dele is similar in appearance to the unrelated characters U+0264 ɤ LATIN SMALL LETTER RAMS HORN, U+27B0 ➰︎ CURLY LOOP, U+0AEA ૪ GUJARATI DIGIT FOUR, U+0263 ɣ LATIN SMALL LETTER GAMMA.

In another form, the dele resembles somewhat a hollow U+266A ♪ EIGHTH NOTE, or perhaps an ornate, calligraphic lowercase letter d.

Additional forms can be noted that are even harder to characterize.

== See also ==
List of proofreader's marks
