= EAngel =

Online company for proofreading services

eAngel
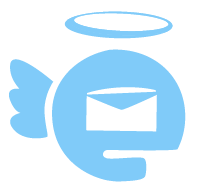
- Company type: Language Proofreading Services
- Industry: Proofreading
- Founded: 2012
- Products: proofreading services
- Services: Proofreading
- Website: www.eangel.me

eAngel is an online company founded in 2012 that provides proofreading services for professional and personal emails. eAngel hires human proofreaders to proofread in five languages, English, Spanish, French, German and Hebrew. Subscription plans for the service begin at $5 and customers are charged varying fractions of a cent per corrected character and word. eAngel has stated that they see businesspeople, students and people with dyslexia as their main target segment.

== Product ==
To use the service, the user can send text directly to a designated email address or upload it to the service's website. The text is then dispatched to one of the available proofreaders. Once the text is corrected, it is sent directly to the user's email.
