= Highest Traditions: The History of No. 2 Squadron, RAAF =

- Author: John Bennett
- Publisher: Australian Government Publishing Service
- Publication date: 1995
- Website: eBook

Highest Traditions: The History of No. 2 Squadron, RAAF is a 1995 book by John Bennett. It is a history of No. 2 Squadron of the Royal Australian Air Force (RAAF). It covers the period from its formation in 1916 during World War I as part of the Australian Flying Corps, the transition to the RAAF, service during World War II and postwar conflicts in Asia, to its disbanding in 1982 after the Vietnam War.
