= Frederick Collins =

Frederick or Fred Collins may refer to:

- Frederick Collins (cricketer), Australian cricketer
- Frederick Howard Collins (indexer) (1857–1910), British indexer and writer
- Frederick Howard Collins (commissioner) (1903–1982), Commissioner of Yukon from 1955 to 1962
- Fred Collins (golfer), English golfer
