= List of proofreader's marks =

This article is a list of standard proofreader's marks used to indicate and correct problems in a text. The marks may be abstract symbols, abbreviations, or (in some cases) entire spelled-out words. These are usually handwritten on the paper containing the text. These indicators are interleaved in the text or placed in margins. Different languages use different proofreading marks and sometimes publishers have their own in-house proofreading marks.

Lists of these marks can often be found in relevant standards like ISO 5776 or BS 5261, style guides such as The Chicago Manual of Style, encyclopedias such as the Encyclopædia Britannica, dictionaries such as the OED, and instructive materials for editors and proofreaders.

== Abbreviations ==
These abbreviations are those prescribed by the Chicago Manual of Style. Other conventions exist.

Abbreviation	Meaning	Use
bf	Boldface	Set in boldface
caps	Capitalize	Set in capital letters
eq #	Equalize spacing	
fl	Flush left	Align text flush with left margin
fr	Flush right	Align text flush with right margin
hr #	Insert hair space	
ital	Italics	Set in italic type
lc	Lower case	Set in lowercase
ls	Letterspace	Adjust letterspacing
rom	Roman	Put in Roman (non-italic) font
sc	Small caps	Put text in small caps
set	Insert question mark	
sp	Spell out	Used to indicate that an abbreviation should be spelled out, such as in its first use
stet	Let it stand	Indicates that proofreading marks should be ignored and the copy unchanged
tr	transpose	Transpose the two words selected
wf	Wrong font	Put text in correct font
ww	Wrong word	Wrong word used (e.g. to/too)

== Symbols ==
Text annotated with proofreading marks to the ISO 5776 standard

Most, but not all, of these symbols can be found in The Chicago Manual of Style. If Unicode contains a character that can be confidently identified with the symbol, its codepoint will be listed; otherwise the symbol in the symbol column is either an image, an html creation, or a typographical approximation using a similar unicode symbol.

Symbol Name	Symbol(s)	Meaning	Example of Use
Dele	or various	Delete	
Pilcrow (Unicode U+00B6)	¶ (Note: Typically with a hollow head, being handwritten.)	Begin new paragraph	
Pilcrow (Unicode U+00B6)	¶ no	Remove paragraph break	
Caret (Unicode U+2038, 2041, 2380 (Note: U+2380 ⎀ INSERTION SYMBOL is the ISO 9995-7 character for the Insert key; it is included here for visual reference.))	‸ or ⁁ or ⎀ (Note: The circumflex character ^ and latin letter v are sometimes shown but these are not correct.)	Insert	
(Unicode U+0023)	# (Note: There is considerable individual variation in the angle at which this mark is written.)	Insert space	
Close up (Unicode U+2050)	⁐	Tie words together, eliminating a space	I was reading the news⁐paper this morning.
	] [	Center text	
	]	Move text right	
	[	Move text left	
	M̲	Insert em dash	
	N̲	Insert en dash	
	☉	Insert full stop	
	⚪︎	Insert punctuation (the punctuation mark wanted is shown inside the circle.)	

== Manuscripts ==
Depending on local conventions, selected text may be underscored (underlined) to indicate any special formatting or typeface to be used, with an explanatory abbreviation written in the margin.

The more common conventions are these:

- single dashed underline for stet, 'let it stand', proof-reading mark cancelled. The margin note stet / may be added.
- single straight underline for italic type
- single wavy underline for **bold type**
- double straight underline for small caps
- double underline of one straight line and one wavy line for **bold italic**
- triple underline for FULL CAPITAL LETTERS (used among small caps or to change text already typed as lower case).

== See also ==
- ISO 5776 – Standard symbols for proofreading
- Blue pencil (editing) – Pencil used to show corrections to written copies
- Obelism – Editors' marks on manuscripts
