= John Robert Gregg =

Irish educator and writer (1867–1948)

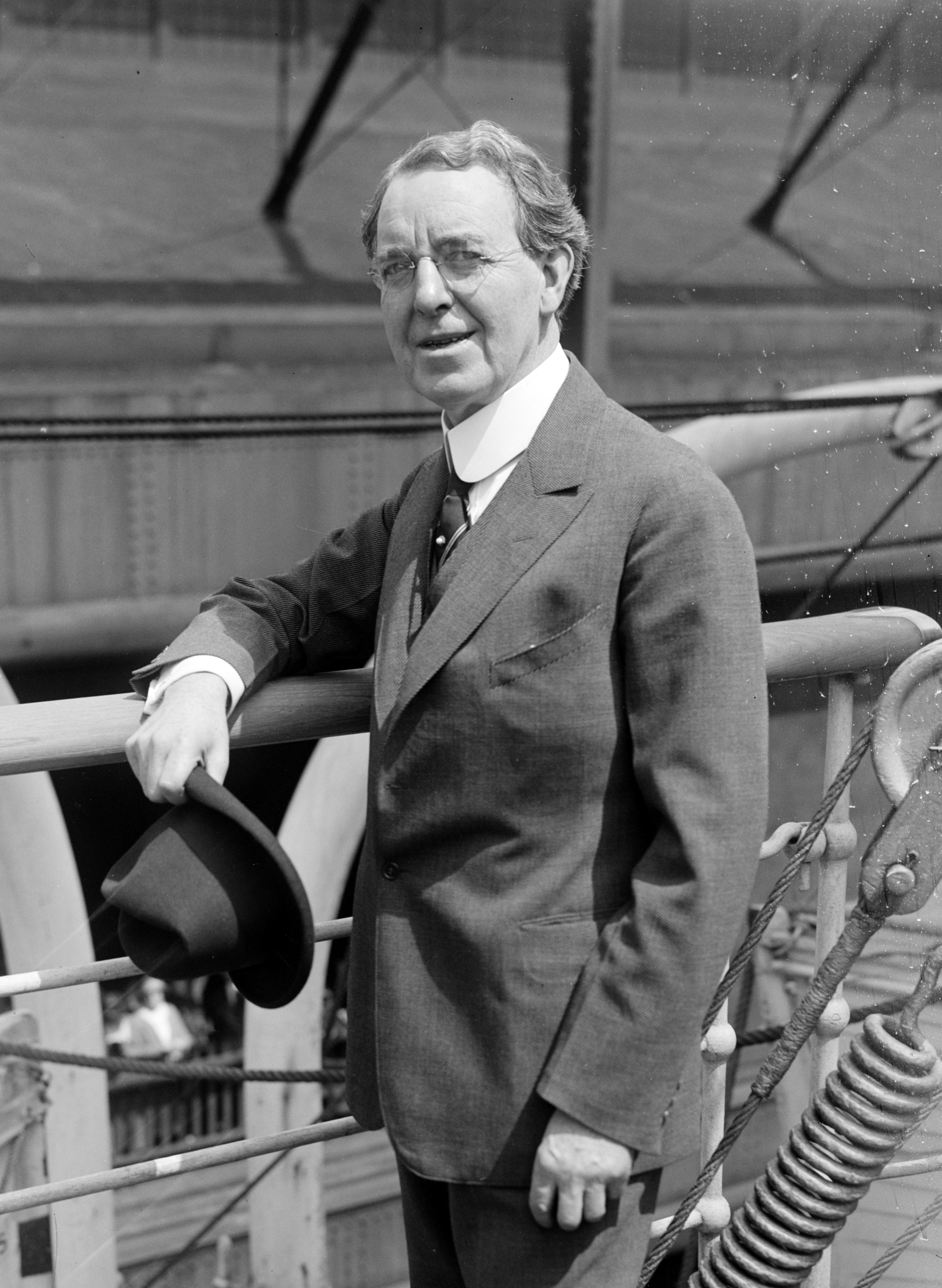
- Born: 17 June 1867; County Monaghan, Ireland
- Died: 23 February 1948 (aged 80); New York City, U.S.
- Citizenship: United States (naturalized)
- Occupations: Educator; publisher; inventor
- Writing career
- Language: English
- Notable work: Gregg shorthand

John Robert Gregg (17 June 1867 – 23 February 1948) was an Irish-born American educator, publisher, and inventor, best known as the creator of the eponymous shorthand writing system, Gregg shorthand. Developed in the late 19th century and refined over several decades, Gregg shorthand became one of the most widely used systems of shorthand in the English-speaking world, particularly in business and educational settings during the 20th century.

Born in Ireland, Gregg emigrated to the United States, where he spent most of his professional life teaching, writing, and promoting methods of efficient written communication. He founded the Gregg Publishing Company, which became a major publisher of shorthand manuals, business texts, and vocational education materials. His work played a significant role in shaping commercial education and office practices in the United States and beyond.

== Life ==
=== Childhood ===
John Robert Gregg was born in Shantonagh, Ireland, as the youngest child of Robert and Margaret Gregg, where they remained until 1872, then they moved to Rockcorry, County Monaghan. Robert Gregg, who was of Scottish ancestry, was station-master at the Bushford railway station in Rockcorry. He and his wife raised their children as strict Presbyterians, and sent their children to the village school in Rockcorry, which John Robert Gregg joined in 1872. On his second day of class, John Robert was caught whispering to a schoolmate, which prompted the schoolmaster to hit the two children's heads together. This incident profoundly damaged Gregg's hearing for the rest of his life, rendering him unable to participate fully in school, unable to understand his teacher. This ultimately led to John Robert unnecessarily being perceived as dull or mentally disabled by his peers, teachers, and family.

In 1877, one of Robert Gregg's friends, a journalist named Annesley, visited the village for a weekend. He was versed in Pitman Shorthand, and took verbatim notes of the sermon at the village church, causing the preacher to sweat and stutter, out of fear that his sermon, which he had plagiarized from a famous preacher, would be made public through Annesley's notes. That day, Robert Gregg saw the shorthand skill as a powerful asset, so he made it mandatory for his children to learn Pitman shorthand, with the exception of John, who was considered by his family too "simple" to learn it. None of the children succeeded in fully learning the system. On his own, John Robert learned a different shorthand system, that of Samuel Taylor, published in a small book by Odell. He taught himself the system fully, since he did not require the ability to hear in order to learn from the book.

Due to hardships on the family, Gregg had to leave school before the age of 13 in order to support his family's income. He worked in a law office, earning five shillings a week.

=== Career ===
Gregg said he initially set out to improve the English adaptation by John Matthew Sloan of the French Prévost Duployé Shorthand, while working with one of Sloan's sales agents, Thomas Malone. Malone published a system called Script Phonography, of which Gregg asserted a share in authorship was owed to him. Angered by Malone, Gregg resigned from working with him and, encouraged by his older brother Samuel, published and copyrighted his own system of shorthand in 1888. It was put forth in a brochure entitled Light-Line Phonography: The Phonetic Handwriting which he published in Liverpool, England.

In 1893, he emigrated to the United States. That year he published Gregg Shorthand with great success. Gregg settled in Chicago where he wrote many books for the Gregg Publishing Company on shorthand and business practices.

== See also ==
- Gregg shorthand
- Shorthand
- The Gregg Reference Manual
