= Proofreading =

Detection of errors in transcribed text

Proofreading is a phase in the process of publishing where galley proofs are compared against the original manuscripts or graphic artworks, to identify transcription errors in the typesetting process. In the past, proofreaders would place corrections or proofreading marks along the margins of printed text. In modern publishing, material is generally provided in electronic form, traditional typesetting is no longer used and thus (in general) this kind of transcription no longer occurs. (Note: An equivalent function continues in specialist scientific, technical and mathematical publications, where complex notations or diagrams are transcribed from manuscripts to electronic document form using specialist software.)

== Professional ==
=== Traditional method ===
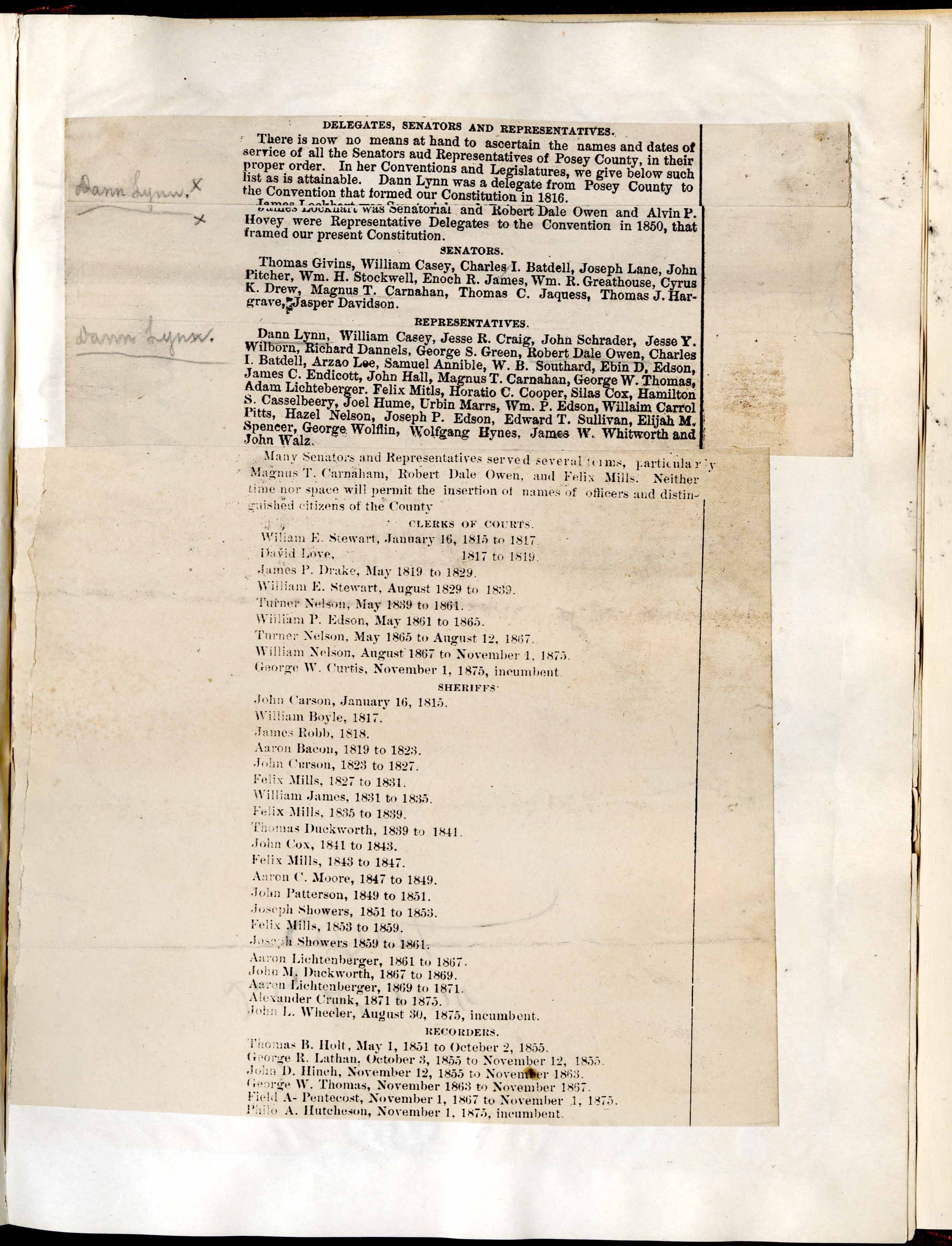
A galley proof

A "galley proof" (familiarly, "a proof") is a typeset version of copy or a manuscript document. It may contain typographical errors ("printer's errors"), as a result of human error during typesetting. Traditionally, a proofreader looks at a portion of text on the copy, compares it to the corresponding typeset portion, and then marks any errors (sometimes called "line edits") using standard proofreaders' marks.

Unlike copy editing, the defining procedure of a proofreading service is to work directly with two sets of information at the same time. Proofs are then returned to the typesetter for correction. Correction-cycle proofs will typically have one descriptive term, such as "bounce", "bump", or "revise" unique to the department or organization and used for clarity to the strict exclusion of any other.

=== Alternative methods ===
"Copy holding" or "copy reading" employs two readers per proof. The first reads the text aloud literally as it appears, usually at a comparatively fast but uniform rate. The second reader follows along and marks any pertinent differences between what is read and what was typeset. This method is appropriate for large quantities of boilerplate text where it is assumed that there will be comparatively few mistakes.

Experienced copy holders employ various codes and verbal shortcuts that accompany their reading. The spoken word "digits", for example, means that the numbers about to be read are not words spelled out; and "in a hole" can mean that the upcoming segment of text is within parentheses. "Bang" means an exclamation point. A "thump" or "screamer" made with a finger on the table represents the initial cap, comma, period, or similar obvious attribute being read simultaneously. Thus the line of text "(He said the address was 1234 Central Blvd., and to hurry!)" would be read aloud as "in a hole [thump] he said the address was digits 1 2 3 4 [thump] central [thump] buluhvuhd [thump] comma and to hurry bang". Mutual understanding is the only guiding principle, so codes evolve as opportunity permits. In the above example, two thumps after buluhvuhd might be acceptable to proofreaders familiar with the text.

This copy-reading approach can also be used by a single proofreader, if they first record themselves speaking the text aloud and then listen back to the recording while reading the typeset version.

"Double reading" is when a single proofreader checks a proof in the traditional manner and then another reader repeats the process. Both initial the proof. With both copy holding and double reading, responsibility for a given proof is necessarily shared by the two proofreaders.

"Scanning" is used to check a proof without reading it word for word, has become common with the computerization of typesetting and the popularization of word processing. Many publishers have their own proprietary typesetting systems, while their customers use more common commercial programs. Before the original data can be published, it must be converted into a format used by the publisher. The end product is usually called a conversion. If a customer has already proofread the contents of a file before submitting it to a publisher, there will be no reason for another proofreader to re-read it from the copy (although this additional service may be requested and paid for). Instead, the publisher is held responsible only for formatting errors, such as typeface, page width, and alignment of columns in tables; and production errors such as text inadvertently deleted. To simplify matters further, a given conversion will usually be assigned a specific template.

=== Checklists ===
Proofreaders are expected to consistently maintain a high level of accuracy because they occupy the last stage of typographic production before publication.

Checklists are common in proofreaders where there is sufficient uniformity of product to condense some or all proofreading tasks into a list. They may also act as a training tool for new hires. Checklists are never comprehensive, however: proofreaders still have to find all mistakes that are not mentioned or described, thus limiting their usefulness.

=== Distance ===
As with other steps in the editorial process, it is important to get some distance from the text before attempting to proofread it, and best not to proofread one's own text. Mildred Tripp, who spent many years and founded businesses as a specialty proofreader of Bible editions, noted that her lack of strong religious feelings or interest in scripture was an asset in that she did not get intellectually or spiritually wrapped up in the text and could focus on finding mistakes.

== Proofreading and copy-editing ==
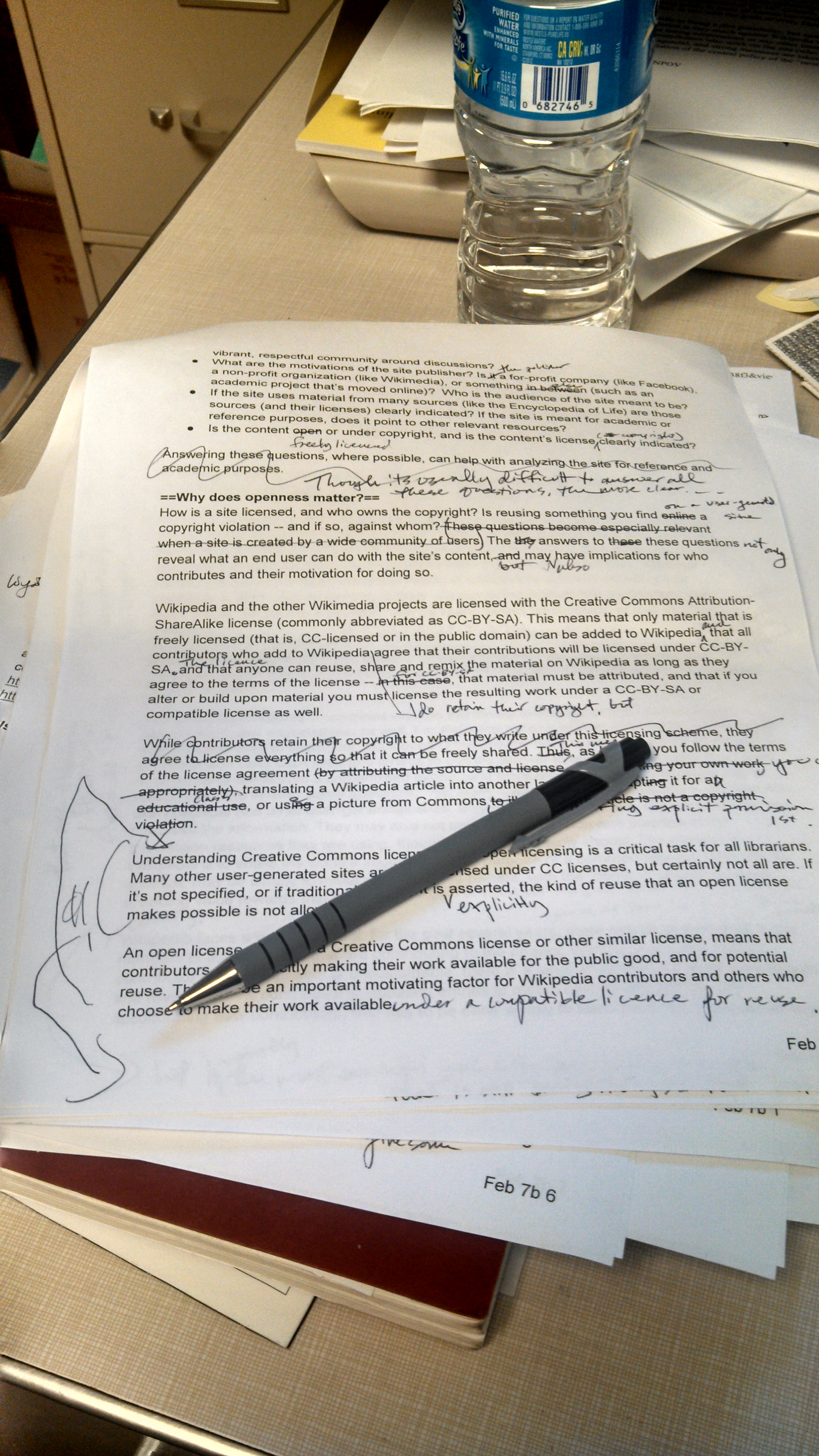
Example of non-professional copy editing in progress.

The term "proofreading" is sometimes incorrectly used to refer to copy editing, and vice versa. Although there is necessarily some overlap, proofreaders typically lack any real editorial or managerial authority, but they may mark queries for typesetters, editors, or authors. To set expectations before hiring proofreaders, some employers post a notice that the job advertised is not a writing or editing position and will not become one. Creativity and critical thinking by their very nature conflict with the strict copy-following discipline that commercial and governmental proofreading requires. Thus, proofreading and editing are fundamentally separate responsibilities. In contrast to proofreaders, copy editors focus on a sentence-by-sentence analysis of the text to "clean it up" by improving grammar, spelling, punctuation, syntax, and structure. The copy editor is usually the last editor an author will work with. Copy editing focuses intensely on style, content, punctuation, grammar, and consistency of usage.

Copy editing and proofreading are parts of the same process; each is necessary at a different stage of the writing process. Copy editing is required during the drafting stage. The copy editors polish the text for precision and conciseness. They attempt to understand the purpose of the writing and the intended audience; therefore, they ask questions such as where the document will be published and who will read it, and they edit accordingly. Proofreading, rather, is required during the last stage of the editing process. Its scope is limited, as the proofreaders focus only on reading the text to ensure the document is error-free and ready for publication. Proofreading generally focuses on correcting any final typos, spelling errors, stylistic inconsistencies (e.g., whether words or numerals are used for numbers), and punctuation errors.

== In fiction ==
Examples of proofreaders in fiction include:

- The History of the Siege of Lisbon (Historia do Cerco de Lisboa), a 1989 novel by Nobel laureate Jose Saramago
- the short story "Proofs" in George Steiner's Proofs and Three Parables (1992)
- the short story "Evermore" in Cross Channel (1996) by Julian Barnes, in which the protagonist Miss Moss is a proofreader for a dictionary.
- Under the headline "Orthographical" in James Joyce's 1922 novel Ulysses, the protagonist Leopold Bloom, watching the typesetter foreman Mr. Nannetti read over a "limp galleypage", thinks "Proof fever".
- Isaac Asimov's short story "Galley Slave" features a robot proofreader.

== See also ==
- Camera-ready – Document technically ready to print
- Distributed Proofreaders – Web-based proofreading project
- Etaoin shrdlu – Common metal-type printing error
- Galley proof – Initial printing of a work for review
- ISO 5776 – Standard symbols for proofreading
- List of proofreader's marks
- Obelism – Editors' marks on manuscripts
- Press check (printing) – Verifying color on press vs. color proof
- Style guide – Standard for writing and design of documents
- Typographical syntax – Aspect of typography
- Writing circle – Support group of like-minded writers
