= The Business Style Handbook =

Writing style guide

- Second edition (2012)
- Authors: Helen Cunningham and Brenda Greene
- Original title: The Business Style Handbook: An A-to-Z Guide for Effective Writing on the Job
- Language: American English
- Subject: Style guide
- Genre: reference
- Published: 2002 (First ed.); 2012 (Second ed.); McGraw-Hill
- Publication place: United States
- Media type: Paperback
- Pages: 285 (second edition)
- ISBN: 978-0-07-180010-5

The Business Style Handbook: An A-to-Z Guide for Effective Writing on the Job, usually called The Business Style Handbook, is a 280-page style guide tailored to people who write on the job. The authors are Helen Cunningham and Brenda Greene.

== History ==
Helen Cunningham and Brenda Greene, the authors, worked in public relations. McGraw-Hill published the first edition in 2002 and the second edition in 2012. In 2003, McGraw-Hill published the book in complex Chinese. In 2004, China Financial and Economic Publishing House published a simplified Chinese edition. Tata McGraw-Hill released an Indian edition in 2003. In 2025, The Business Style Handbook, second edition, appeared in the works list of the Bartz v. Anthropic copyright settlement, which identified books included in training Anthropic’s AI systems.

== Focus ==
This style guide focuses on business communications and is tailored for people who write on the job, which distinguishes it from style guides that are written from a journalism perspective. An academic annotated guide to business and technical communication describes the book as a reference work offering practical guidance for professional writers. According to the publisher, the book outlines the authors’ approach to business writing and summarizes their survey of communications executives at Fortune 500 companies. It also includes an A-to-Z reference section covering usage, grammar, punctuation, and terms commonly encountered in business writing.

The Business Style Handbook is on the recommended reading list for Microsoft Education Written Competencies and is found in university libraries around the world.

It is frequently recommended for business writing courses at universities, including USC Annenberg School for Communication and Journalism. Writing institutes, such as Borders Connect, a U.K. learning provider, also use the book for courses. The second edition is available in digital format on the O’Reilly learning platform.

== Organization ==
The Business Style Handbook is organized as follows.

Acknowledgments Cites the Fortune 500 companies and communications executives who participated in the authors’ surveys for the first and second editions of the book.

Introduction Describes the purpose of the book and its methodology.

Fortune 500 Survey Results A summary of findings from the authors’ survey on writing practices at Fortune 500 companies. For example, it quotes one respondent who states, “No matter the level of employee, clearly communicating ideas is critical to the success of initiatives.”

Why Style Matters Discusses the importance of writing well to establish credibility in business. For example, “Good communication skills are increasingly viewed as a core competency in the corporate world.”

The Case for Standards Reviews the benefits organizations can gain from helping employees strengthen their writing skills.

Write with Purpose Outlines how to approach writing strategically.

Email: Before You Hit Send Gives recommendations for best practices in business emails, such as how to use cc, bcc and Reply to All appropriately.

The A-to-Z Entries A 200-page section of entries on usage, grammar, punctuation and spelling for words and phrases relevant for business writing.

Example: bottom line, bottom-line Two words when used as a noun, as in How will the price increase impact the bottom line? Write with a hyphen when used as an adjective: It is too soon to assess to the bottom-line impact of the price increases.

== Reception ==
Praeger Publishers said the book was "recommended for all collections". Richard Pachter of The Columbian said the book offers "rudimentary guidance and direction to those who need help, not only in composition, but in format, style and, of course, language."
