= English writing style =

An English writing style is a combination of features in an English language composition that has become characteristic of a particular writer, a genre, a particular organization, or a profession more broadly (e.g., legal writing).

An individual's writing style may be distinctive for particular themes, personal idiosyncrasies of phrasing and/or idiolect; recognizable combinations of these patterns may be defined metaphorically as a writer's "voice."

Organizations that employ writers or commission written work from individuals may require that writers conform to a "house style" defined by the organization. This conformity enables a more consistent readability of composite works produced by many authors and promotes usability of, for example, references to other cited works.

In many kinds of professional writing aiming for effective transfer of information, adherence to a standardised style can facilitate the comprehension of readers who are already accustomed to it. Many of these standardised styles are documented in style guides.

== Personal styles ==
All writing has some style, even if the author is not thinking about a personal style. It is important to understand that style reflects meaning. For instance, if a writer wants to express a sense of euphoria, they might write in a style overflowing with expressive modifiers. Some writers use styles that are very specific, for example in pursuit of an artistic effect. Stylistic rule-breaking is exemplified by the poet. An example is E. E. Cummings, whose writing consists mainly of only lower case letters, and often uses unconventional typography, spacing, and punctuation. Even in non-artistic writing, every person who writes has their own personal style.

== Proprietary styles ==
Many large publications define a house style to be used throughout the publication, a practice almost universal among newspapers and well-known magazines. These styles can cover the means of expression and sentence structures, such as those adopted by Time. They may also include features peculiar to a publication; the practice at The Economist, for example, is that articles are rarely attributed to an individual author. General characteristics have also been prescribed for different categories of writing, such as in journalism, the use of SI units, or questionnaire construction.

== Academic styles ==
University students, especially graduate students, are encouraged to write papers in an approved style. This practice promotes readability and ensures that references to cited works are noted in a uniform way. Typically, students are encouraged to use a style commonly adopted by journals publishing articles in the field of study. The list of Style Manuals & Guides, from the University of Memphis Libraries, includes thirty academic style manuals that are currently in print, and twelve that are available on-line. Citation of referenced works is a key element in academic style.

The requirements for writing and citing articles accessed on-line may sometimes differ from those for writing and citing printed works. Some of the details are covered in The Columbia Guide to Online Style.

== See also ==
- Grammar
- List of style guides
- Style guides
- Usage

== Bibliography ==
- The Elements of Style, by William Strunk Jr. and E. B. White, a well-known guide to American usage
- Fowler's Modern English Usage, a well-known guide to British English usage
- List of frequently misused English words
- APA style, American Psychological Association (APA) style - widely accepted for research papers
- MLA style manual, Modern Language Association's (MLA) style - most often used in English studies, and literary criticism
- Sentence spacing in language and style guides
