= ISO 5776 =

Standard symbols for proofreading

Text annotated with proofreading marks to the ISO 5776 standard

ISO 5776, published by the International Organization for Standardization (ISO), is an international standard that specifies symbols for proofreading such as of manuscripts, typescripts and printer's proofs. The total number of symbols specified is 16, each in English, French and Russian.

The standard is partially derived from the British Standard BS 5261, but is closer to German standards DIN 16511 and 16549-1. All of these standards date from the time before desktop publishing.

A first edition of the standard was published in 1983.

A second edition of the standard was published in 2016 which cancels and replaces the first edition from 1983.

The third revised edition was published in 2022 and replaced the second edition from 2016.

== See also ==
- List of proofreader's marks
