= Brexit 50p coin =

Commemorative coin

The Brexit 50p coin is a commemorative fifty-pence British coin that was originally struck to mark the planned withdrawal of the United Kingdom from the European Union on 31 October 2019. The minting of the Brexit coin was ordered by Sajid Javid. A total of 10 million Brexit coins, each stamped with the date 31 October 2019, were planned to be minted. In late October 2019, with increasing doubts that Brexit would actually happen on that date, the minting of the coins was "paused".

In late October 2019 it was announced that the coins would be recycled as the United Kingdom would not in fact leave the European Union as planned on 31 October 2019. A Treasury spokesman said that a coin to mark Brexit would still be produced but that it would enter circulation after the UK had left the EU.

== Relaunch ==
In December 2019 a new Brexit 50p coin was announced after the Conservative Party victory in the general election. Gold and silver versions of the coins were announced for collectors. In January 2020 Downing Street announced that the coins would start entering circulation on 31 January 2020.

The coin is inscribed with the slogan "Peace, prosperity and friendship with all nations", inspired by Thomas Jefferson's first presidential inaugural address. The quotation proved controversial for non-Brexit-related reasons, such as the lack of an Oxford comma, over which Philip Pullman called for a boycott of the coin.
