= Typographical syntax =

Aspect of typography

Typographical syntax, also known as orthotypography, is the aspect of typography that defines the meaning and rightful usage of typographic signs, notably punctuation marks, and elements of layout such as flush margins and indentation.

Orthotypographic rules vary broadly from language to language, from country to country, and even from publisher to publisher. As such, they are more often described as "conventions".

While some of those conventions have ease of understanding as a justification – for instance, specifying that low punctuation (commas, full stops, and ellipses) must be in the same typeface, weight, and style as the preceding text – many are probably arbitrary.

The rules dealing with quotation marks are a good example of this: which ones to use and how to nest them, how much whitespace to leave on both sides, and when to integrate them with other punctuation marks.

Each major publisher maintains a list of orthotypographic rules that they apply as part of their house style.

== See also ==
- Typographical error
