= The Gregg Reference Manual =

Grammar guide

The Gregg Reference Manual: A Manual of Style, Grammar, Usage, and Formatting: Tribute Edition
- Author: William Sabin
- Published: McGraw-Hill / Irwin, Mar. 1, 2010 (11th ed.)
- Publication place: United States of America
- ISBN: 978-0073397108

The Gregg Reference Manual
- Author: William Sabin
- Published: McGraw-Hill Ryerson Higher Education, Feb. 25, 2014 (9th ed.)
- Publication place: Canada
- ISBN: 978-0071051156

The Gregg Reference Manual: A Manual of Style, Grammar, Usage, and Formatting is a guide to English grammar and style, written by William A. Sabin and published by McGraw-Hill. The book is named after John Robert Gregg. The eleventh (“Tribute”) edition was published in 2010. The ninth Canadian edition, entitled simply The Gregg Reference Manual with no subtitle, was published on February 25, 2014.

The book was first published in 1951 as the Reference Manual for Stenographers and Typists by Ruth E. Gavin of the Gregg Publishing Company.

The book is widely used in business and professional circles. Neil Holdway, a news editor on the Chicago Daily Herald, said that the book "can answer the tough grammar questions, and it has provided me with authoritative yet readable explanations I can comfortably pass on to the newsroom when discussing our fair language."

== Editions ==
These are the years of publication of all the editions of the Gregg Reference Manual in the United States:

- 1st: 1951
- 2nd: 1956
- 3rd: 1961
- 4th: 1970
- 5th: 1977
- 6th: 1985
- 7th: 1992
- 8th: 1996
- 9th: 2001
- 10th: 2005
- 11th: 2010
