= Annual Bibliography of English Language and Literature =

- Producer: Modern Humanities Research Association (United Kingdom)
- History: 1998 to present
- Languages: English

Access
- Providers: Chadwick-Healy
- Cost: Subscription

Coverage
- Disciplines: English Language, English Literature
- Record depth: index
- Format coverage: monographs, periodical articles, critical editions of literary works, book reviews, collections of essays, and doctoral dissertations
- Temporal coverage: 1892 to present
- Geospatial coverage: worldwide
- No. of records: 960,000
- Update frequency: Monthly

Print edition
- Print dates: 1921 to present
- ISSN: 1461-7528

Links
- Website: collections.chadwyck.com/marketing/home_abell.jsp

Annual Bibliography of English Language and Literature (ABELL) is an English language bibliography pertaining to the English lexicon and its literature. It contains articles dating to 1920 and is published by Chadwick-Healy which is now part of ProQuest on behalf of the Modern Humanities Research Association (MHRA) . Its focus is English studies. The first volume was published in 1921, in print, covering relevant literature beginning in 1920. It stays current with regular updates. Temporal coverage is from 1892 to the present, encompassing over 960,000 records.

== Coverage ==
This indexing service is akin to the British form of the MLA Bibliography, yet distinctions between the two databases don't allow much overlap. Publishing formats included are monographs, periodical articles, critical editions, book reviews, collections of essays and dissertations, poetry, prose, fiction, films, biography, travel writing, and literary theory.

Subject area coverage encompasses English language syntax, phonology, lexicology, semantics, stylistics, dialectology, vocabulary, orthography, dictionaries and grammars; literature and the computer. Also, traditional cultures of the English-speaking world: including custom, belief, narrative, song, dance, and material culture. Indexing includes manuscript studies, textual studies, and the history of publishing.

It is global in scope and articles in other languages are part of its coverage.
