= Style sheet =

Style sheet (sometimes written as stylesheet) may refer to:

- Style guide, often called "style sheet" synonymously inside the publishing industry
- Style sheet (desktop publishing), a feature of desktop publishing programs.
- Style sheet language, a computer language that describes the presentation of structured documents
- Style sheet (web development), W3C standards for web page style sheets such as
  - Cascading Style Sheets (CSS) or
  - Extensible Stylesheet Language (XSL)
