= Judith Butcher =

Editor and writer (1927–2015)

Judith Butcher (18 September 1927 – 6 October 2015) was an editor and writer. She is best known as the author of Copy-editing: The Cambridge Handbook, referred to throughout the English-speaking world as 'the definitive handbook on the subject'. She played a role in developing the emerging craft of copy-editing into a fully fledged discipline and establishing it as an essential stage in the publishing process.

== Cambridge University Press ==
For 20 years, Butcher was 'chief subeditor' at the academic publishing house Cambridge University Press (CUP). She set up and managed what CUP's former chief executive Dr Jeremy Mynott has called 'the best subediting department of any in the English-speaking world'. The unreliable and costly tradition of trusting the printer's readers to pick up errors after typesetting was replaced by a methodical system of preparing manuscripts for typesetting and eliminating errors in advance. By personal example and using the growing file of notes that eventually became Copy-editing, she trained scores of copyeditors, many of whom subsequently carried her principles and standards to other publishing houses and organisations in the UK and overseas.

== The Cambridge Handbook ==
Butcher turned her training notes into a house manual for CUP's copy-editors and later into the book published in 1975 by CUP as Copy-editing: The Cambridge Handbook. It was the first copy-editing manual in English and has remained the authority in its field for over 40 years. It has since been renamed Butcher's Copy-editing and is now in its fourth edition. When she retired from employment Butcher kept the book up to date, making extensive revisions to keep abreast of changes in publishing technology and procedures. However, the fundamental principles that she set out remain unchanged.

The book set the standard for good editing practice and disseminated it throughout the UK, the English-speaking world and beyond: it has been translated into several languages. Copy-editing enabled standards to be maintained during the structural changes of the 1970s and 1980s, as publishing houses shed staff and turned increasingly to freelance copy-editors. Copy-editing is now predominantly a freelance occupation, and the book has provided guidance to generations of freelances without access to in-house training.

== The Society for Editors and Proofreaders ==
It was to support the growing number of freelances that the Society of Freelance Editors and Proofreaders (later the Society for Editors and Proofreaders and now the Chartered Institute of Editing and Proofreading) was founded in 1988, and Butcher became its first honorary president. She attended almost every annual conference of the society and continued to nurture new copy-editors and proofreaders.
