= MHRA Style Guide =

Academic style guide of the Modern Humanities Research Association

MHRA Style Guide: A Handbook for Authors, Editors, and Writers of Theses
- Original title: MHRA Style Book
- Language: English
- Genre: Style guide
- Publisher: Modern Humanities Research Association
- Publication date: 1971–2024
- Publication place: United Kingdom
- Media type: Print / Digital
- Pages: 104
- ISBN: 978-1-83954-248-0
- Website: https://www.mhra.org.uk/style

The MHRA Style Guide is an open-access handbook of academic writing published by the Modern Humanities Research Association. Widely adopted in the United Kingdom and beyond, particularly in the fields of modern languages, literature, and cultural studies, the guide standardizes conventions for spelling, punctuation, and citation.

The fourth edition (2024) has been substantially revised from earlier versions to reflect developments in digital publishing and contemporary academic practice.

== History ==
The style guide descends from the MHRA Style Book, first issued in 1971. Its roots lie in the editorial meetings of the Modern Language Review, held since 1905. The 2024 edition represents the ninth revision overall and the fourth under the Style Guide title.

Editorial oversight is entrusted to a voluntary committee of scholars.

== Scope and purpose ==
The MHRA Style Guide does not address questions of rhetoric, argument, or expression. Rather, it offers prescriptive guidance on the mechanical elements of style: orthography, punctuation, capitalization, quotation, referencing, and indexing. It is intended to ensure typographical and bibliographical consistency across MHRA publications and to support scholars, students, and publishers in the humanities more broadly. It is modelled on Hart's Rules, published by Oxford University Press.

== Structure and features ==
The 2024 edition is organized into eight chapters, replacing the fourteen of the previous edition. It includes sections on:

- spelling and punctuation (notably Oxford '-ize' forms and use of accents)
- referencing of print, digital, and audiovisual materials
- style for foreign languages, transliteration, and non-Latin scripts
- preparation of copy for publication, including tables, illustrations, and indexing

A Quick Guide summarizes key conventions.

Online versions of the guide are available free of charge under a Creative Commons licence. The Guide also remains available in print.

== Publication history ==
=== MHRA Style Book ===
- 1971: first edition
- 1978: second edition
- 1981: third edition
- 1991: fourth edition
- 1995: fourth edition reprinted with amendments
- 1996: fifth edition

=== MHRA Style Guide ===
- 2002: first edition
- 2008: second edition
- 2013: third edition
- 2015: third edition reprinted with minor corrections
- 2024: fourth edition

== See also ==
- Chicago Manual of Style
- Hart's Rules
