= IBM Press =

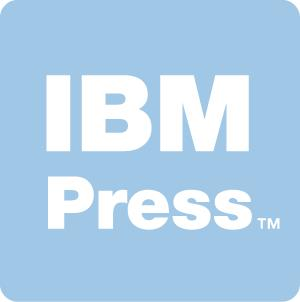
- Parent company: IBM, Pearson Education
- Status: Active
- Country of origin: United States
- Headquarters location: Indianapolis, Indiana
- Distribution: Worldwide
- Publication types: Books and ebooks
- Nonfiction topics: Information technology, IBM products
- Official website: www.ibmpressbooks.com

IBM Press is IBM's official retail book publisher for professionals and academia. A collaboration between IBM and Pearson Education, books are distributed in print and on Safari Books Online.

Published topics range from general information technology to IBM products. Topics include social business and internet marketing, information management, information technology, Lotus collaboration tools, management and business strategy, Rational and software development, writing and editing, security, service management, SOA and IBM WebSphere.
