= Galley proof =

Initial printing of a work for review

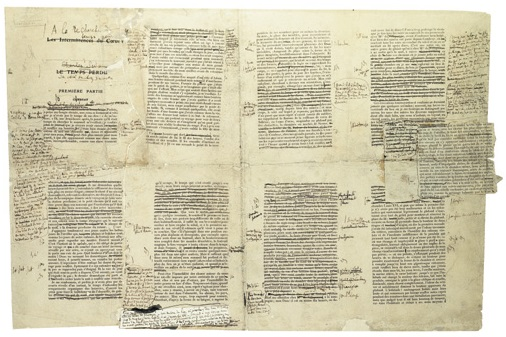
First galley proof of A la recherche du temps perdu: Du côté de chez Swann with handwritten revision notes by Marcel Proust

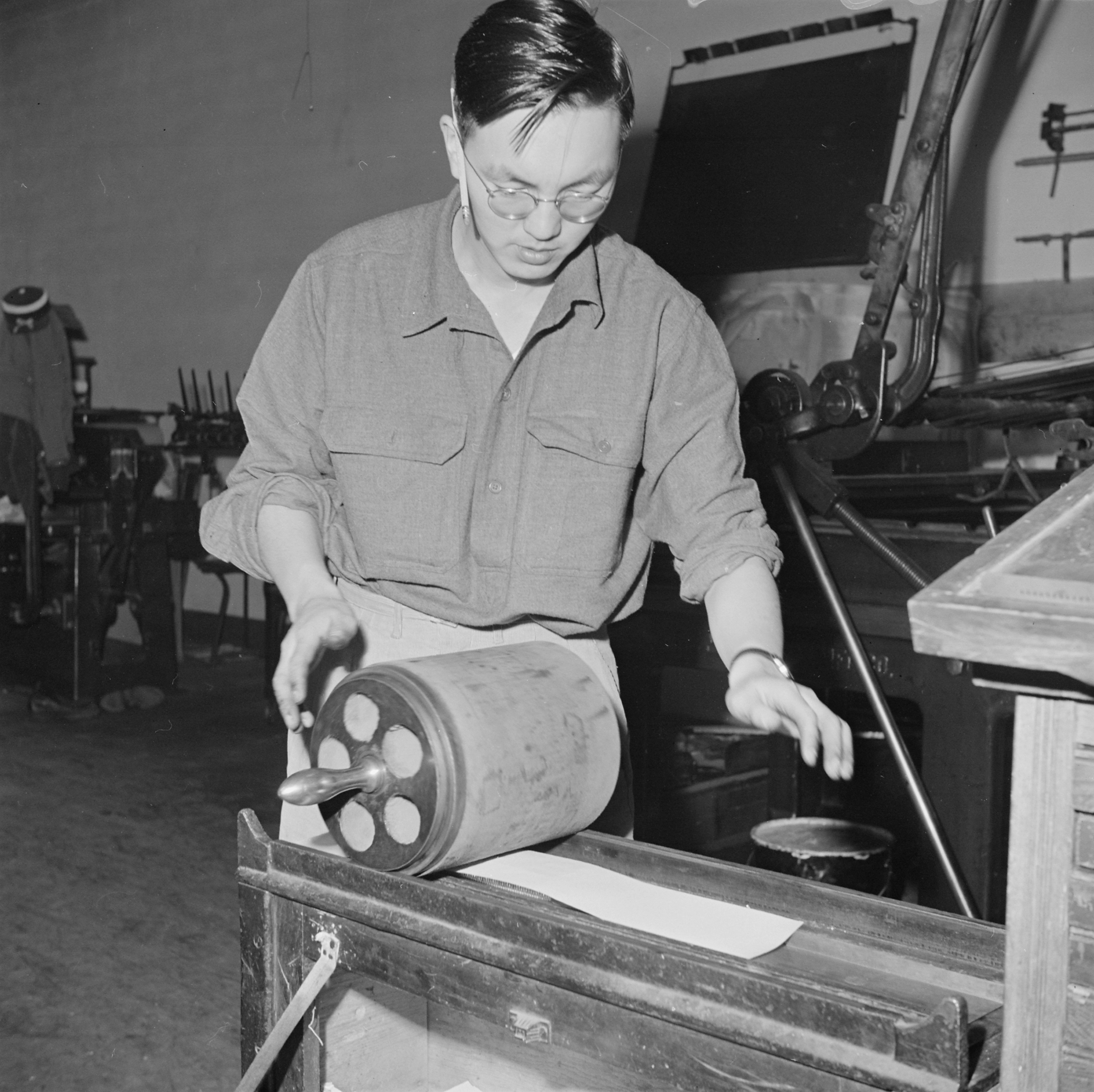
Bill Hosokawa pulling a galley proof while working as a newspaper editor in the Heart Mountain Relocation Center, 1943

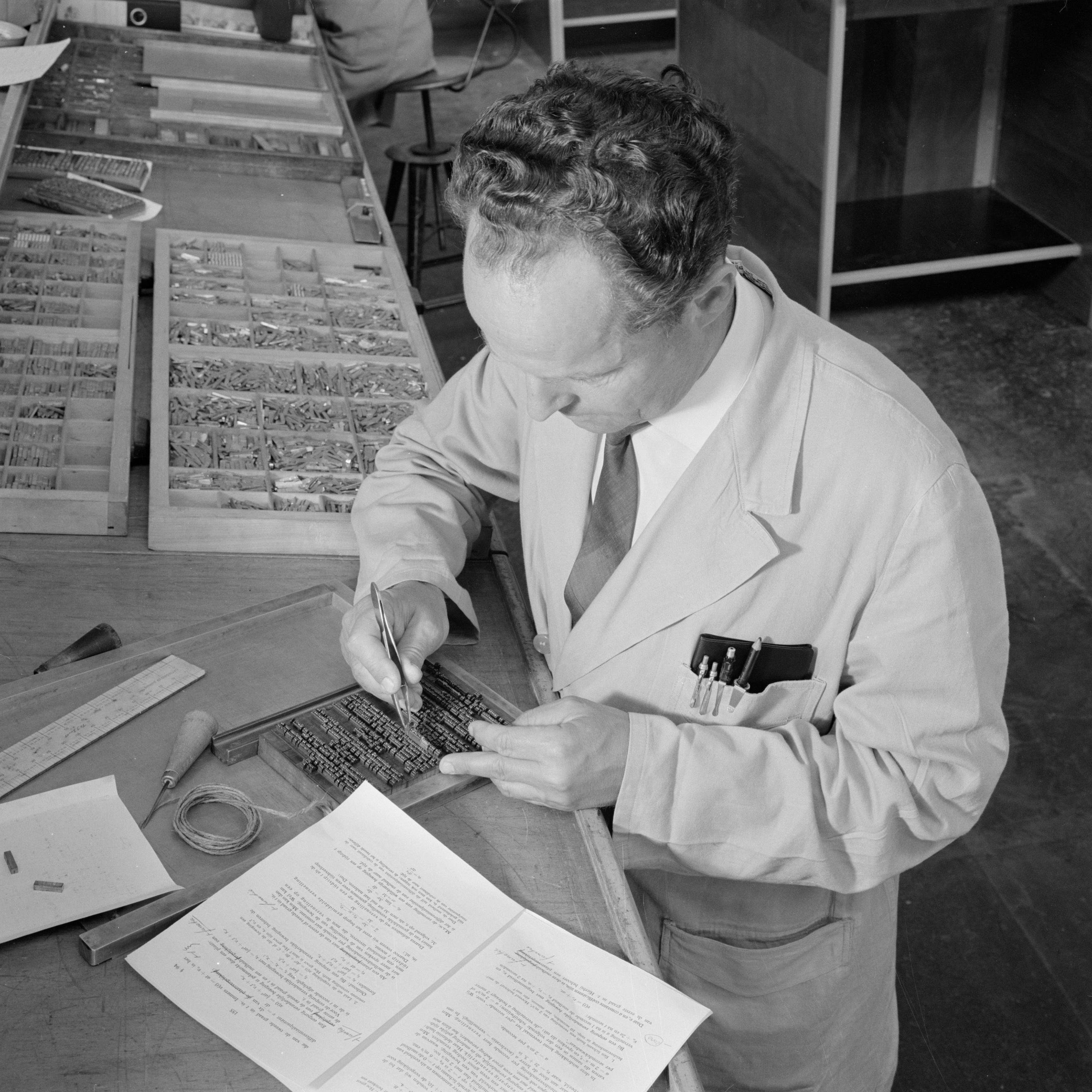
Correcting after a galley proof. The Netherlands, 1965.

In printing and publishing, proofs are the preliminary versions of publications meant for review by authors, editors, and proofreaders, often with extra-wide margins. Galley proofs may be uncut and unbound, or in some cases electronically transmitted. They are created for proofreading and copyediting purposes, but may also be used for promotional and review purposes.

== Historical galley proofs ==
Proof, in the typographical sense, is a term that dates to around 1600. The primary goal of proofing is to create a tool for verification that the job is accurate separate from the pages produced on the press. All needed or suggested changes are physically marked on paper proofs or electronically marked on electronic proofs by the author, editor, and proofreaders. The compositor, typesetter, or printer receives the edited copies, corrects and re-arranges the type or the pagination, and arranges for the press workers to print the final or published copies.

Galley proofs or galleys are so named because in the days of hand-set letterpress printing in the 1650s, the printer would set the page into "galleys", metal trays into which type was laid and tightened into place. A small proof press would then be used to print a limited number of copies for proofreading. Galley proofs are thus, historically speaking, galleys printed on a proof press.

From the printer's point of view, the galley proof, as it originated during the era of hand-set physical type, had two primary purposes, those being to check that the compositor had set the copy accurately (because sometimes individual pieces of type did get put in the wrong type case after use) and that the type was free of defects (because type metal is comparatively soft, so type can get damaged).

Once a defect-free galley proof was produced, the publishing house requested a number of galley proofs to be run off for distribution to editors and authors for a final reading and corrections to the text before the type was fixed in the case for printing.

== Uncorrected proofs ==
An uncorrected proof is a proof version (on paper or in digital form) which is yet to receive final author and publisher approval. The term may also appear on the covers of advance reading copies; see below.

These days, because much typesetting and pre-press work is conducted digitally and transmitted electronically, the term uncorrected proof is more common than the older term galley proof, which refers exclusively to a paper proofing system. However, if a paper print-out of an uncorrected proof is made on a desk-top printer or copy machine and used as a paper proof for authorial or editorial mark-up, it approximates a galley proof, and it may be referred to as a galley.

Preliminary electronic proof versions are also sometimes called digital proofs, PDF proofs, and pre-fascicle proofs, the last because they are viewed as single pages, not as they will look when gathered into fascicles or signatures for the press.

== Final proofs ==
Proofs created by the printer for approval by the publisher before going to press are called final proofs. At this stage in production, all mistakes are supposed to have been corrected and the pages are set up in imposition for folding and cutting on the press. To correct a mistake at this stage entails an extra cost per page, so authors are discouraged from making many changes to final proofs, while last-minute corrections by the in-house publishing staff may be accepted.

In the final proof stage, page layouts are examined closely. Additionally, because final page proofs contain the final pagination, if an index was not compiled at an earlier stage in production, this pagination facilitates compiling a book's index and correcting its table of contents.

== Advance reading copies ==
Historically, some publishers have used paper galley proofs as advance copies or advance reading copies (ARCs) or as pre-publication publicity proofs. These are provided to reviewers, magazines, and libraries in advance of final publication. These galleys are not sent out for correction, but to ensure timely reviews of newly published works. The list of recipients designated by the publisher limits the number of copies to only what is required, making advance copies a form of print-on-demand (POD) publication.

Pre-publication publicity proofs are normally gathered and bound in paper, but in the case of books with four-color printed illustrations, publicity proofs may be lacking illustrations or have them in black and white only. They may be marked or stamped on the cover "uncorrected proof", but the recipient is not expected to proofread them, merely to overlook any minor errors of typesetting.

Galley proofs in electronic form are rarely used as advance reading copies due to the possibility of a recipient editing the proof and issuing it as their own. However, trusted colleagues are occasionally offered electronic advance reading copies, especially if the publisher wishes to quickly typeset a page or two of "advance praise" notices within the book itself.

== See also ==
- Composing stick
- Prepress color proofing
