= Horace Hart =

English printer and biographer (1840–1916)

- Born: 1840; Suffolk, England
- Died: 9 October 1916 (aged 75–76); Youlbury Lake
- Occupations: printer and biographer
- Writing career
- Notable work: Hart's Rules for Compositors and Readers

Horace Henry Hart (1840 – 9 October 1916) was an English printer and biographer. He was the author of Hart's Rules for Compositors and Readers, first issued in 1893.

== Early life and early career ==
Hart was born in Suffolk in 1840; his father was a shoemaker. He was sent to the printers Woodfall & Kinder in London at the age of fourteen, and was apprenticed to the compositor's trade two years later. He became the manager of Woodfall & Kinder by the age of twenty-six, but left to take over management of the London branch of the Edinburgh-based Ballantyne Press.

He left Ballantyne Press in 1880, when he was appointed manager of the head office and main works of William Clowes & Sons, which was then the biggest printing house in Britain. He left, however, after only three years at Clowes, when vacancy for Controller of the Oxford University Press (OUP) was advertised.

== Oxford University Press ==
Hart served as Printer to the University of Oxford and Controller of the University Press between 1883 and 1915. During that time, he convinced the Press to begin using wood-pulp paper, and also introduced collotype and printing by lithography. In 1896, he recalled Charles Stanhope, 3rd Earl Stanhope with his book Charles, Earl Stanhope and the Oxford University Press. In 1900, he wrote Notes on a Century of Typography at the University Press Oxford 1693–1794.

In 1893 he issued the first version of what became known as Hart's Rules as a single broadsheet page for in-house use. Although first issued internally at the Oxford University Press in 1893, these rules had their origins in 1864, when Hart was a member of the London Association of Correctors of the Press, working for Woodfall & Kinder. With a small group of fellow members from the same printing house, he drew up a list of "rules", which was constantly updated and revised during his career at three other printing houses.

== Health issues and death ==
The last twenty years of Hart's life were plagued by bouts of depression and insomnia. He suffered his first nervous breakdown in 1887, followed by another in 1888. A final, severe breakdown led to his retirement from the OUP in 1915 at the age of seventy-five. The following year, he drowned himself in Youlbury Lake near Oxford, a secluded lake in the grounds of a neighbour's garden. His gloves were folded neatly on the bank.

== Works ==
- [Hart's] Rules for Compositors and Readers [at the University Press, Oxford] (1896)
  - First edition (privately printed edition, for use solely at the press): 1896
  - Fifteenth edition (first authorized edition for sale to the public): 1904
  - Thirty-ninth edition (final edition in the traditional format): 1983
- Charles Earl Stanhope and the Oxford University Press in Collectanea III (1896)
  - 1966: First standalone edition
- Notes of a Century of Typography at the University Preß, Oxford: 1693-1794. With Annotations & Appendixes. (1900)
  - First edition: 1900
  - Facsimile reprint with supplementary material: 1970

== See also ==
- Vivian Ridler
