= Hart's Rules =

Authoritative style guide published by Oxford University Press

New Hart's Rules: The Oxford Style Guide
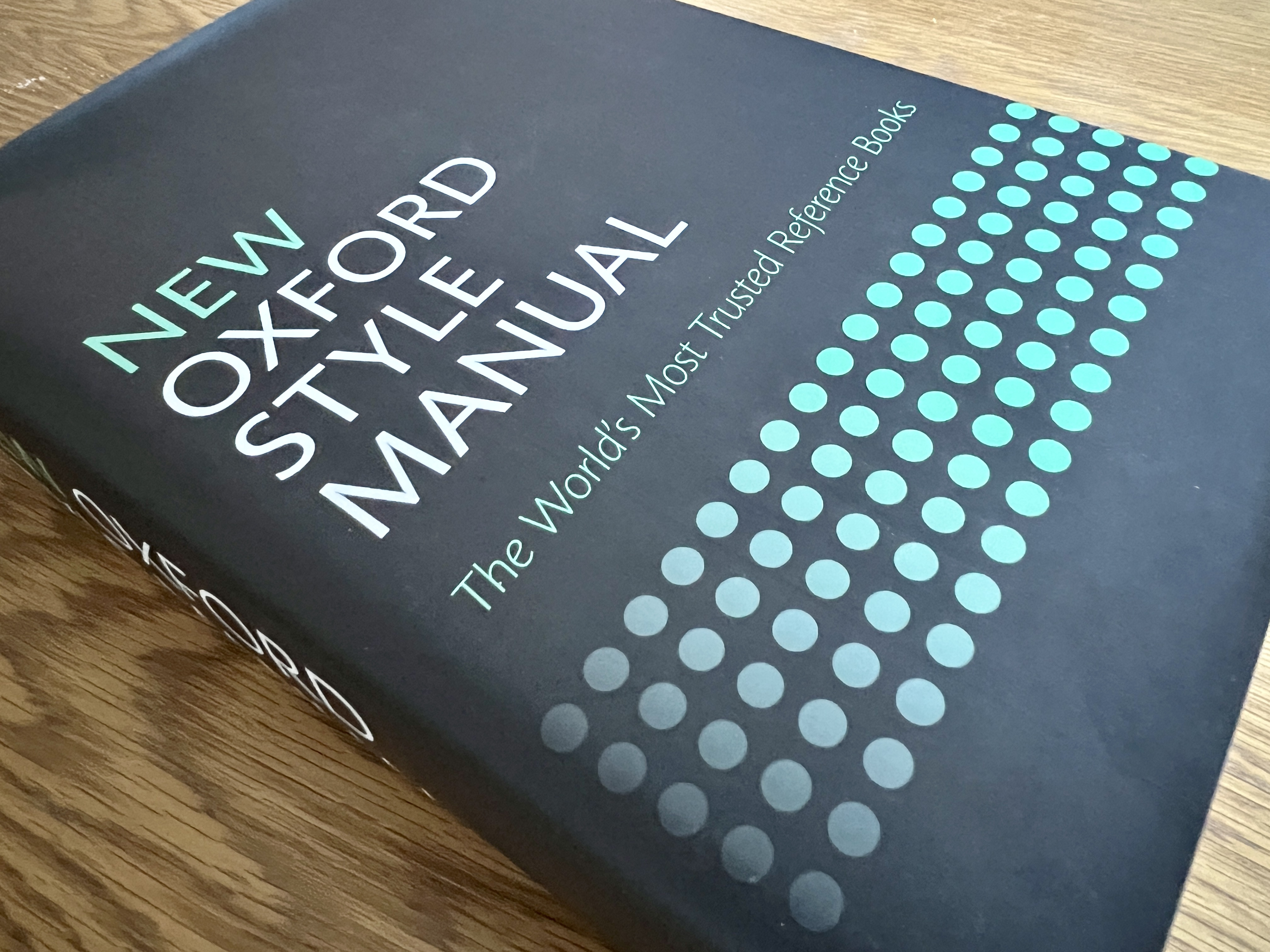
- Cover of the New Oxford Style Manual
- Author: Horace Hart
- Original title: Rules for compositors and readers at the University Press, Oxford
- Language: English
- Genre: Style guide
- Publisher: Oxford University Press
- Publication date: 1893–2014
- Publication place: United Kingdom
- Media type: Print / Digital
- Pages: 464 (New Hart's Rules, 2nd edition)
- ISBN: 978-0-19-957002-7
- LC Class: PN147 .N42 2014
- Website: Oxford Dictionaries (Subscription or UK public library membership required)

Hart's Rules is the oldest continuously updated style guide in the English language, providing advice on topics such as punctuation, citation, and typography. Printer and biographer Horace Hart first issued the work in 1893 for the compositors and readers of Oxford University Press (OUP). It has evolved through multiple editions to become one of the most influential works of its kind.

== Origins ==
The first edition of Rules for Compositors and Readers at the University Press, Oxford appeared in 1893, as a privately circulated 24-page booklet, printed on small-format blue card and issued without charge to staff of the Oxford University Press. Its compiler, Horace Hart (1840–1916), had been appointed Controller of the Press in 1883, tasked with modernizing what was then a struggling and bifurcated institution – divided between a commercially successful Bible Side and a faltering Learned Side.

The original Rules had more modest aims than their later successors. They were intended to standardize typographic presentation across OUP's growing academic output, particularly as the workforce expanded and the influx of new staff made oral transmission of house norms insufficient. The Rules drew upon Hart's earlier experience in London printing houses. The preface to the fifteenth edition reveals that Hart began compiling examples as early as 1864.

== Expansion and publication ==
The booklet proved unexpectedly popular. Though originally intended for internal use, copies began circulating informally among authors and other printers. Hart published it formally in 1904, with the fifteenth edition, prompted by the discovery that it was being resold in London shops without his consent. This marked the beginning of Hart's Rules as a commercial product. It soon came to be known and used well beyond Oxford, particularly by government departments and commercial printers.

Over the following decades, Hart's Rules expanded dramatically in length, complexity, and scope. Successive Controllers of the Press and senior readers updated and annotated it, transforming it from a simple reference into an editorial codex. By the thirty-ninth edition (1983), it had grown to nearly 200 pages, and was arranged alphabetically by subject.

== Authority and influence ==
The success of Hart's Rules owed much to the growing prestige of the Oxford University Press and its most significant scholarly project of the era, the Oxford English Dictionary (OED). Hart worked closely with OED editors, especially James Murray and Henry Bradley, who reviewed and sanctioned the Rules, lending them significant academic authority.

The Rules established conventions not just for spelling and punctuation, but for the formatting of references, use of capital letters, italicization, bibliographies, and foreign languages. Hart's careful balance between prescriptive rules and practical flexibility set a standard that many other presses followed. Its influence extended internationally: the Rules were cited by printers of English around the world, and were emulated in the development of similar handbooks such as The Chicago Manual of Style and MHRA Style Guide.

== Modern editions ==
In 2002, in lieu of a fortieth edition of Hart's Rules, Oxford University Press published an expanded successor as The Oxford Guide to Style. It also issued a volume combining this work with The Oxford Dictionary for Writers and Editors (the successor to the Authors' and Printers' Dictionary by Frederick Howard Collins) as The Oxford Style Manual. This marked a shift to a larger reference format and a broader editorial remit, encompassing a fuller range of digital and academic practices.

In 2005, an abridged edition of The Oxford Guide to Style appeared under the title New Hart's Rules, returning to the compact handbook format that had been characteristic of the work for most of its life. The most recent edition of this work appeared in 2014.

The press renamed the combined Oxford Style Manual as the New Oxford Style Manual to correspond with New Hart's Rules and the New Oxford Dictionary for Writers and Editors, but the sequence of editions is continuous with that of the original Oxford Style Manual of 2003.

== See also ==
- Fowler's Modern English Usage
- The King's English
