= Flourish of approval =

Dutch written symbol

Krul

A flourish of approval (goedkeuringskrul) or curl (krul) is a Dutch symbol, analogous to a check mark. It indicates approval, and is mostly used to grade schoolwork.

== History ==
The krul first appeared in the early 19th century together with the rising bureaucracy in the Netherlands.

== Usage ==
The symbol is rarely used outside of the Netherlands apart from the Dutch Caribbean islands and former Dutch colonies such as Indonesia, South Africa, Suriname.

Despite its wide usage throughout the country and its former colonies, there is no Unicode symbol for it. The symbol is also not available natively in TeX, but can be created in various ways.

== Symbols similar in appearance ==
- The German penny symbol, ₰.
- Some forms of the proofreading symbol dele.

== See also ==
- Check mark § International differences
