= Australian Government Publishing Service =

Defunct publishing and printing service of the government of Australia

The Australian Government Publishing Service (AGPS) was an Australian Government publishing service that operated from 1970 to 1997 and was the sole centralised Australian Government publishing and printing service. It also had retail outlets for government publications in all state capital cities of Australia.

It also produced manuals, and publications specifically oriented towards publishing.

== Closure ==
In 1997 the production facilities of AGPS, including the Commonwealth Government Printing Office, was closed down. The business was sold to CanPrint Communications Pty Ltd.

After the sale, the printing, publishing and distribution was the responsibility of each individual government department or agency.

The few remaining functions of AGPS were taken over by its successor, AusInfo, part of the then new Department of Finance and Administration. The AusInfo website has been archived via a webpage snapshot on Trove.
