= Frederick Howard Collins (indexer) =

Frederick Howard Collins (1857-1910) was a British indexer and writer. Best known for his Authors' and printers' dictionary (1905), Collins also wrote on the philosophy of Herbert Spencer and on subject indexing. Collins' dictionary is one of the earliest known sources that recommend using a serial comma or "Oxford comma", citing a written recommendation by Herbert Spencer.

== Works ==
- An epitome of the Synthetic philosophy, London: Williams and Norgate, 1889. With a preface by Herbert Spencer.
- The diminution of the jaw in the civilized races: an effect of disease, London and Edinburgh: Williams and Norgate, 1891
- Twelve charts of the tidal streams on the west coast of Scotland, London: J.D. Potter, 1894
- 'Subject indexes: some principles which underlie them', London: Chiswick Press, 1896.
- 'Herbert Spencer', in Philosophers and scientists, New York: Doubleday & McClure Co., 1899
- 'The index', in Charles T. Jacobi, Some notes on books and printing : a guide for authors, publishers, & others, London: C. Whittingham & Co., 1902.
- Author & Printer: A Guide for Authors, Editors, Printers, Correctors of the Press, Compositors, and Typists; With full list of Abbreviations; An Attempt to codify the best Typographical Practices of the Present Day, London: Frowde, 1905. Reprinted in 1909 as Authors' and Printers' Dictionary.
