= Modern Language Review =

- April 2018 (Volume 113, part 2)
- Language: English

Publication details
- History: 1905 to present
- Publisher: Modern Humanities Research Association (United Kingdom)
- Frequency: Quarterly

Standard abbreviations
- ISO 4: Mod. Lang. Rev.

Indexing
- ISSN: 0026-7937 (print); 2222-4319 (web)
- JSTOR: 00267937

Links
- Journal homepage

Modern Language Review is the journal of the Modern Humanities Research Association (MHRA). It is one of the oldest journals in the field of modern languages. Founded in 1905, it has published more than 3,000 articles and 20,000 book reviews.

Modern Language Review is published four times a year (in January, April, July and October). All articles are in English and their range covers the following fields:

- English (including United States and the Commonwealth)
- French (including Francophone Africa and Canada)
- Germanic (including Dutch and Scandinavian)
- Hispanic (including Latin-American, Portuguese, Catalan, and Galician)
- Italian
- Slavonic and East European Studies
- General Studies (including linguistics, comparative literature, and critical theory)

== History ==
The first issue was published in October 1905 with John G. Robertson as the founding editor-in-chief. When Robertson died in 1933, he was replaced by Charles Jasper Sisson.

== Sources ==
Modern Language Review page on the MHRA website
