= Modern Humanities Research Association =

Organization dedicated to study of the humanities

The Modern Humanities Research Association (MHRA) is a United Kingdom–based international organisation that aims to encourage and promote advanced study and research of humanities. It is most notable for producing the MHRA Style Guide.

== History ==
The MHRA was founded in 1918 in Christ's College, Cambridge. The unincorporated charity became an incorporated company with the same name on 2 October 1997. Its declared aim is to encourage and promote advanced study and research in the field of the modern humanities, which include the modern and medieval European languages, literatures and cultures. The current chair of the MHRA is Professor Derek Connon of Swansea University.

== Publications ==
As well as the MHRA Style Guide, and the Annual Bibliography of English Language and Literature, the MHRA publishes six scholarly journals:

- The Modern Language Review
- Austrian Studies
- Portuguese Studies
- The Slavonic and East European Review
- The Yearbook of English Studies
- Working Papers in the Humanities

and a number of book series:

- Legenda
- MHRA Critical Texts
- MHRA Tudor & Stuart Translations
- MHRA Jewelled Tortoise
- MHRA European Translations
- MHRA New Translations
- MHRA Texts & Dissertations
- Publications of the MHRA
- MHRA Bibliographies
