= List of style guide abbreviations =

This list of style guide abbreviations provides the meanings of the abbreviations that are commonly used as short ways to refer to major style guides. They are used especially by editors communicating with other editors in manuscript queries, proof queries, marginalia, emails, message boards, and so on.

Abbr.	Style guide	Author(s) or organization	Field/subject	Language(s)	Website
ACS	ACS style	American Chemical Society	Chemistry	American English	pubs.acs.org
AMA	AMA Manual of Style	American Medical Association	Medicine, health care	American English	amamanualofstyle.com
AP	AP Stylebook	Associated Press	Journalism	American English	apstylebook.com
APA	APA style	American Psychological Association	Psychology, social sciences	American English	apastyle.apa.org
CBE	Scientific Style and Format: The CBE Manual for Authors, Editors, and Publishers, 6th edition (Note: Now called The CSE Manual: Scientific Style and Format for Authors, Editors, and Publishers.)	Council of Biology Editors	Science, especially life sciences	American English	
CGEL	Cambridge Grammar of the English Language	Cambridge University Press	Grammar and usage	British English	
CGEU	Cambridge Guide to English Usage	Cambridge University Press	Grammar and usage	British English	
Chicago	The Chicago Manual of Style	University of Chicago Press	General, publishing	American English	chicagomanualofstyle.org
CMOS	The Chicago Manual of Style	University of Chicago Press	General, publishing	American English	chicagomanualofstyle.org
CMS	The Chicago Manual of Style	University of Chicago Press	General, publishing	American English	chicagomanualofstyle.org
CSE	The CSE Manual: Scientific Style and Format for Authors, Editors, and Publishers	Council of Science Editors	Science, especially life sciences	American English	
GMAU	Garner's Modern American Usage	Oxford University Press	Grammar and usage	American English	
GPO	U.S. Government Printing Office Style Manual	United States Government Publishing Office	Government publishing	American English	govinfo.gov
GRM	The Gregg Reference Manual	McGraw-Hill Higher Education	Business	American English, Canadian English	
ISNAD	The ISNAD Citation Style	Sivas Cumhuriyet University - Abdullah Demir	General, publishing	Arabic, English, Persian, Turkish	isnadsistemi.org
ISO 690	ISO 690 (Note: Titled: Information and documentation — Guidelines for bibliographic references and citations to information resources)	International Organization for Standardization	General	American English	ISO 690:2021
IEEE	Institute of Electrical & Electronics Engineers Style (IEEE style)	Institute of Electrical and Electronics Engineers	Electrical engineering, electronics, computer engineering	American English	
MHRA	MHRA Style Guide	Modern Humanities Research Association	Humanities	British English	mhra.org.uk
MLA	MLA Handbook; MLA Style Manual	Modern Language Association	Humanities	American English (Note: A Spanish translation of the 9th edition of the MLA Handbook is set to be released in Spring 2025.)	style.mla.org
MSTP	Microsoft Manual of Style for Technical Publications	Microsoft	Technical writing	American English	
MWDEU	Merriam-Webster’s Dictionary of English Usage	Merriam-Webster	Grammar and usage	American English	
NHR	New Hart’s Rules	Oxford University Press	General, publishing	British English	
NLM	Citing Medicine	National Library of Medicine	Medicine, health care	American English	ncbi.nlm.nih.gov
NOSM	New Oxford Style Manual	Oxford University Press	General	British English	
NYT	New York Times Manual of Style and Usage	The New York Times	Journalism	American English	
ODSWE	Oxford Dictionary for Scientific Writers and Editors	Oxford University Press	Science writing, technical writing	British English	
ODWE	Oxford Dictionary for Writers and Editors	Oxford University Press	General	British English	
OED	Oxford English Dictionary	Oxford University Press	General	British English	
OGS	Oxford Guide to Style	Oxford University Press	General	British English	
OSCOLA	Oxford Standard for Citation of Legal Authorities	Faculty of Law, University of Oxford	Law	British English	law.ox.ac.uk
OSM	Oxford Style Manual	Oxford University Press	General	British English	
RILM	The RILM Manual of Style	Répertoire International de Littérature Musicale	Writing on music	American English	
S&W	Elements of Style (Strunk & White)	William Strunk Jr. and E. B. White	General	American English	
Turabian	A Manual for Writers of Research Papers, Theses, and Dissertations	Kate L. Turabian	General, especially academic papers	American English	
URMs	Uniform Requirements for Manuscripts Submitted to Biomedical Journals (Note: Now called the ICMJE recommendations.)	International Committee of Medical Journal Editors	Scientific journals, especially life sciences and medical journals	International English	
