= Scientific writing =

Writing for science

Scientific writing is about science, with the implication that the writing is done by scientists and for an audience that primarily includes peers—those with sufficient expertise to follow in detail. (The similar term "science writing" instead refers to writing about a scientific topic for a general audience; this could be by scientists and/or journalists, for example.) Scientific writing is a specialized form of technical writing, and a prominent genre of it involves reporting about scientific studies such as in articles for a scientific journal. Other scientific writing genres include writing literature-review articles (also typically for scientific journals), which summarize the existing state of a given aspect of a scientific field, and writing grant proposals, which are a common means of obtaining funding to support scientific research. Scientific writing is more likely to focus on the pure sciences compared to other aspects of technical communication that are more applied, although there is overlap. There is not one specific style for citations and references in scientific writing. Whether one is submitting a grant proposal, literature review articles, or submitting an article into a paper, the citation system that must be used will depend on the publication they plan to submit to.

English-language scientific writing originated in the 14th century, with the language later becoming the dominant medium for the field. Style conventions for scientific writing vary, with different focuses by different style guides on the use of passive versus active voice, personal pronoun use, and article sectioning. Much scientific writing is focused on scientific reports, traditionally structured as an abstract, introduction, methods, results, conclusions, and acknowledgments. However, one of the founders of the Royal Academy, Thomas Sprat, also saw connections between scientific writing and writing in the humanities.

One recent advancement in the study of scientific writing is the development of the Coruña Corpus of English Scientific Writing (henceforth CC), which is an electronic corpus focusing on four major areas: Astronomy, History, Philosophy, and Life Sciences.

== History ==
English scientific writing dates back to the 14th century. In 1665, Henry Oldenburg founded the first scientific journal, Philosophical Transactions of the Royal Society.

Scholars consider that Philosophical Transactions of the Royal Society have shaped the fundamental principles of scientific journals, primarily concerning the relevance of scientific priority and peer review. Modern practices of standardized citation did not emerge until the 20th century when the Chicago Manual of Style introduced its citation format, followed by the American Psychological Association in 1929 which became the most used citation style in the scientific discipline.

The Royal Society established good practice for scientific writing. Founder member Thomas Sprat wrote on the importance of plain and accurate description rather than rhetorical flourishes in his History of the Royal Society of London. Robert Boyle emphasized the importance of not boring the reader with a dull, flat style.

Because most scientific journals accept manuscripts only in English, an entire industry has developed to help non-native English speaking authors improve their text before submission. It is just now becoming an accepted practice to utilize the benefits of these services. This is making it easier for scientists to focus on their research and still get published in top journals.

Besides the customary readability tests, software tools relying on Natural Language Processing to analyze text help writer scientists evaluate the quality of their manuscripts prior to submission to a journal. SWAN, a Java app written by researchers from the University of Eastern Finland, is such a tool.

== Writing style guides ==
Publication of research results is the global measure used by all disciplines to gauge a scientist's level of success.

Different fields have different conventions for writing style, and individual journals within a field usually have their own style guides. Some issues of scientific writing style include:

- Dissuasion from, and sometimes advocacy of, the passive voice. Advocates for the passive voice argue for its utility in avoiding first-person pronouns, while critics argue that it can be hard to make claims without an active voice.
- Generalizations about tense. In the mathematical sciences, for example, it is customary to report in the present tense, while in experimental sciences reporting is always in the past tense, as the experiments happened in the past.
- Preferences about "we" vs. "I" as a personal pronoun or a first-person pronoun (e.g., mathematical deductions sometimes include the reader in the pronoun "we.")

Contemporary researchers in writing studies have pointed out that blanket generalizations about academic writing are seldom helpful, for example, scientific writing in practice is complex and shifts of tense and person reflect subtle changes in the section of the scientific journal article. Additionally, the use of passive voice allows the writer to focus on the subject being studied (the focus of communication in science) rather than the author. Similarly, some use of first-person pronouns is acceptable (such as "we" or "I," which depends on the number of authors). According to some journal editors, the best practice is to review articles recently published in the journal a researcher is planning to submit to.

Scientific writing has a strong emphasis on the use of peer-reviewing throughout the writing process. Primarily at the publication phase, when an article is about to be published, most scientific journals will require 1-3 peers to review. The process of peer-reviewing is to ensure that the information that is attempting to be published is accurate and well thought out.

Nobel Prize-winning chemist Roald Hoffmann has stated that, in the chemical sciences, drawing chemistry is as fundamental as writing chemistry.

Different types of citation and reference systems are used in scientific papers. The specific citation style scientific articles use depends on the journal in which the article is published. Some styles that are commonly used are Vancouver, Harvard, and Chicago. The Vancouver system and Parenthetical referencing style are primarily used in medicine. Chicago style is more common for writing that is focused in the social sciences. For the more natural sciences, CSE style is used. Some of the less commonly utilized citation styles include MLA and AMA.

Two examples of styles commonly seen in scientific journals are the Vancouver System and the Harvard System. The Vancouver system is more used for medical journals, while the Harvard System is more used for social and natural science journals. One typical citation style used for a specific discipline is the ACS (American Chemical Society) system, used for Scientific articles on Chemistry. The AMS (American Mathematical Society) style is commonly used for research papers with a base in mathematics. The AIP (American Institute of Physics) Style is typically used for scientific writing pertaining to physics.

=== IMRaD format ===
While not mandatory, scientific writers often follow the IMRaD format, which stands for Introduction, Methods, Results, and Discussion. This serves as a template and allows for consistency across scientific writing.

In articles and publications, the introduction serves a fundamental purpose. It convinces the reader that the information is worth telling. It is common for the "Introduction" to branch from a broad concept connecting to the objective of the research to a specific gap in knowledge that drives the research. In addition to this, another strategy accepted by the scientific community to develop introductions consists of explaining the steps that lead to the hypothesis and research discussed in the writings. The method section is where scientific writers explain the procedure of the experiment or research. In "Results," writers who follow the IMRaD format share, with neutrality, the experimental results, which in "Discussion," are compared with prior information to end with a conclusion about the research, which should be 3 to 5 paragraphs long and consist of statements that reflect the outcomes of the entire publication. As part of the "Result" section of the IMRaD, scientists utilize a plethora of analytical tools in order to analyze the data from the research in a way that allows other scientists to understand. This also gives the opportunity for expansion on certain aspects of the research if there are still unknowns present.

== Large language models in scientific writing ==
Artificial intelligence in scientific writing is considered by scholars to be a new dilemma for the scientific community. Large language models like ChatGPT have been demonstrated to be useful tools in the research and draft creation process, summarizing information and creating basic text structures, and they have also shown to be of utility in the review process by improving drafts and editing, reducing the revision time and the number of grammatical errors present. However, they have also raised questions about the morality of their utilization and the disparities they may widen if they stop being free.

Additionally, the scientific community discusses the possibility of unintended plagiarism when utilizing artificial intelligence programs, as texts generated by chatbots have passed plagiarism detectors as completely original work, making it impossible for other scientists in the peer-review process to differentiate a person-written article from one written by artificial intelligence.

== Scientific report ==
The stages of the scientific method are often incorporated into sections of scientific reports. The first section is typically the abstract, followed by the introduction, methods, results, conclusions, and acknowledgments. The introduction discusses the issue studied and discloses the hypothesis tested in the experiment. The step-by-step procedure, notable observations, and relevant data collected are all included in the methods and results. The discussion section consists of the author's analysis and interpretations of the data. Additionally, the author may choose to discuss any discrepancies with the experiment that could have altered the results. The conclusion summarizes the experiment and will make inferences about the outcomes. The paper will typically end with an acknowledgments section, giving proper attribution to any other contributors besides the main author(s). To get published, papers must go through peer review by experts with significant knowledge in the field. During this process, papers may get rejected or edited without adequate justification.

This historically emerged form of argument has been periodically criticized for obscuring the process or investigation, eliminating the incorrect guesses, false leads, and errors that may have occurred before coming to the final method, data, explanation, and argument presented in the published paper. This lack of transparency was criticized by Joseph Priestley as early as 1767 as mystifying the research process and more recently for similar reasons by Nobel Laureate Peter Medawar in a BBC talk in 1964.

== Ethical considerations in scientific writing ==
Ethical principles are fundamental to the practice of scientific writing, ensuring integrity, transparency, and accountability in the dissemination of research findings. Adhering to ethical standards not only upholds the credibility of scientific literature but also promotes trust among researchers, institutions, and the broader public.

=== Plagiarism ===
Plagiarism, the appropriation of another person's ideas, words, or work without proper attribution, is a serious ethical violation in scientific writing. Authors are obligated to accurately cite sources and give credit to the original creators of ideas or information. Plagiarism undermines academic integrity and can result in severe consequences, including retraction of publications and damage to one's reputation.

=== Authorship and contributorship ===
According to various authorship guidelines created by scientific societies as well as some national bodies, authorship should be based on substantial contributions to the conception, design, execution, or interpretation of the research study. All individuals who meet the criteria for authorship should be listed as authors, while those who do not meet the criteria but have made significant contributions should be acknowledged appropriately. Honorary or ghost authorship, where individuals are included as authors without fulfilling the criteria, is unethical and should be avoided.

The authorship guidelines of many journals state that to qualify for authorship, it is not sufficient to have made a major contribution to the work and to be accountable for the work. The widely used guidelines of the International Committee for Medical Journal Editors, for instance, recommends that all authors must also contribute to "Drafting the work or reviewing it critically for important intellectual content". While guidelines typically indicate that others should be acknowledged, which typically happens in an Acknowledgments section, the identities of such people are not included in publication metadata and do not flow into scholarly databases. Thus, the restrictions are a hindrance to receiving formal credit for scientific contributions and this is opposed by some who believe that a guiding principle should be to indicate who did what, which is sometimes called "contributorship".

=== Data integrity and transparency ===
Scientific writing requires transparency in reporting research methods, data collection procedures, and analytical techniques to ensure the reproducibility and reliability of findings. Authors are responsible for accurately representing their data and disclosing any conflicts of interest or biases that may influence the interpretation of results. Fabrication, falsification, or selective reporting of data are serious ethical breaches that undermine the integrity of scientific research.

=== Publication ethics ===
Authors, editors, and reviewers are expected to adhere to ethical standards throughout the publication process. Editors have a responsibility to evaluate manuscripts objectively, ensuring fairness and impartiality in the peer review process. Authors should submit original work that has not been published elsewhere and comply with journal guidelines regarding manuscript preparation and submission. Reviewers are entrusted with providing constructive feedback and identifying any ethical concerns or scientific misconduct present in the manuscript.

=== Inclusivity and diversity ===
Scientific writing should strive to be inclusive and representative of diverse perspectives, populations, and voices. Authors should consider the potential impact of their research on different communities and take steps to mitigate any harm or bias. Promoting diversity in authorship, peer review, and editorial boards enhances the quality and relevance of scientific literature and fosters a more equitable research environment. By upholding these ethical principles, researchers contribute to the advancement of knowledge with integrity, accountability, and respect for ethical standards.

== See also ==
- Academic publishing
- Academic writing
- Citation
- Common English usage misconceptions
- EASE Guidelines for Authors and Translators of Scientific Articles
- Fast abstract
- GLISC
- Impact factor
- IMRAD structure (Introduction, Method, Result and Discussion)
- A Manual for Writers of Research Papers, Theses, and Dissertations, authored by Kate L. Turabian (The Chicago Manual of Style)
- Medical writing
- Parenthetical referencing
- Peer review
- Research paper mill
- Scientific article
- Scientific journal
- Scientific literature
- Scientific method
- Science communication
- Science journalism
- Technical writing
