= ASA style =

Format for writing research papers

ASA style is a widely accepted format for writing university research papers in the field of sociology. It specifies the arrangement and punctuation of footnotes and bibliographies. Standards for ASA style are specified in the ASA Style Guide, which is published by the American Sociological Association, the main scholarly organization for academic sociologists in the United States. The ASA Style Guide, published by the American Sociological Association, is designed to aid authors preparing manuscripts for ASA journals and publications.

== General features ==
ASA style is closely related in appearance and function to APA (American Psychological Association) style. As with APA style, the general format for citing references is parenthetical referencing. All references are to be included at the end of the paper in a section titled "References", rather than "Works Cited" as in MLA style. Also unlike MLA style, parenthetical references include the year of publication. The "author-date" in text citation system is a readily recognizable feature of ASA style. This emphasis on dates is carried over into the references section, where the date is the first piece of information to follow the author's or authors' name(s).

== Software support ==
ASA style is supported by most major reference management software programs, including Endnote, Procite, Zotero, Refworks, and so forth, making the formatting of references a fairly straightforward task.

== See also ==
- Citation
- Style guide
