= KnightCite =

Web based citation generator

KnightCite is a web based citation generator hosted by the Calvin University Hekman Library that formats bibliographic information per academic standards for use in research papers and scholarly works. It has become a popular tool among high school and college students seeking help formatting bibliographies and citations. In addition to Calvin, many other university libraries refer students to this web site.

The use of the tool is free of charge. It is provided as a public good by Calvin University. Glenn Remelts, library director at Calvin University said, "This is just our gift to the struggling students who've probably spent more time formatting their bibliographies than writing their papers. So if we can make life a little easier, that was our mission." According to the developer, Justin Searls, "The purpose of citations is not to give kids another thing to learn. The purpose of citations is to avoid plagiarism of other people's work, and in anything we can create or give students to help avoid plagiarizing other people's work I think is for the better."

== Function ==
This tool can generate citations and bibliographic information in three formats, MLA Style Manual, APA style and The Chicago Manual of Style. Users are prompted to enter information obtained from an academic source, and the engine automatically delivers the bibliographic reference in the requested format. "It gets rid of the need to memorize tedious syntactical styles that aren't of any educational benefit in-and-of-themselves," according to the developer.

== History ==
The web site was developed in 2004 by Calvin College student Justin Searls, who built the site as an employee of the school's Hekman Library, at the request of a digital librarian there. As of 2005 the programming required more than 25,000 lines of code.

As of July 2025, the site shows it has generated 96,317,215 citations.
