= Drive-by (disambiguation) =

A drive-by is a form of hit-and-run tactic, a personal attack carried out by an individual or individuals from a moving vehicle.

Drive-by or Drive By may also refer to:

== Music ==
- Drive By (band), an American music group
- Drive-By, an American hip-hop duo, consisting of Anybody Killa and Blaze Ya Dead Homie; see Pony Down
- Drive By (album), a 2003 album by The Necks
- Drive by Shooting, a 1987 album by Henry Rollins

=== Songs ===
- "Drive By" (song), a 2012 song by Train
- "Drive By", a song by Way Out West from Way Out West
- "Driveby", a song by Neil Young from Sleeps with Angels
- "Drive-by", a dialogue, heard on The Inbetweeners Soundtrack
- "Drive By", a 2001 song by The Jimmy Swift Band from Now They Will Know We Were Here

== Other uses ==
- "Drive By" (Flight of the Conchords), the seventh episode of the television series Flight of the Conchords
- Drive-by download, kind of web threats with automated downloading and installing of trojan after visiting infected web page
- Drive-by citation, a reference in an academic paper that is mentioned without proper explanation
