= Vancouver system =

Citation style that uses numbers within the text to cite references

The Vancouver system (or author–number system) is a citation format that uses numbers within the text that refer to entries in a reference list. It is popular in the physical sciences and is one of two referencing systems normally used in medicine, the other being parenthetical referencing (name–year, also known as author–date). The most common implementations of the Vancouver system are Citing Medicine, AMA Manual of Style, and The CSE Manual.

== Overview ==
Hundreds of scientific journals use author–number systems. They all follow the same essential logic (that is, numbered citations pointing to numbered list entries), although the trivial details of the output mask, such as punctuation, casing of titles, and italic, vary widely among them. They have existed for over a century; the names "Vancouver system" or "Vancouver style" have existed since 1978. The latest version of the latter is Citing Medicine, per the "Style and Format" section of the Recommendations for the Conduct, Reporting, Editing, and Publication of Scholarly Work in Medical Journals published by the International Committee of Medical Journal Editors (ICMJE). These recommendations, the Vancouver Convention and Vancouver guidelines, have a much broader scope than only the citation style: they provide ethical guidelines for writers and rules for co-authorship in scientific collaborations to avoid fraud. The Convention further entails compliance with the Helsinki Declaration, and research projects must be recommended by an independent ethics committee.

In the broad sense, the Vancouver system refers to any author–number system regardless of the formatting details. A narrower definition of the Vancouver system refers to a specific author–number format specified by the ICMJE Recommendations. For example, the AMA Manual of Style represents Vancouver in the broad sense because it is an author–number system that conforms to the ICMJE Recommendations, but not in the narrow sense because its formatting differs in some minor details from Citing Medicine (such as what is italicized and whether the citation numbers are bracketed).

== History ==
Author–number systems have existed for over a century and throughout that time have been one of the main types of citation style in scientific journals (the other being author–date). In 1978, a committee of editors from various medical journals, the Vancouver Group, met in Vancouver, British Columbia, Canada, to agree to a unified set of requirements for the articles of such journals. This meeting led to the establishment of the Uniform Requirements for Manuscripts Submitted to Biomedical Journals (URMs), now known as the ICMJE Recommendations. Part of the Recommendations is the reference style, for which the ICMJE selected the long-established author–number principle.

The URMs were developed 15 years before the World Wide Web debuted. During those years, they were published as articles or supplements in various ICMJE member journals. These included publications in The BMJ, the 1995 CMAJ publication and the 1997 Annals of Internal Medicine publication. In the late 1990s and early 2000s, journals were asked to cite the 1997 JAMA version when reprinting the Uniform Requirements.

In the early 2000s, with the Web having become a major force in academic life, the idea gradually took hold that the logical home for the latest edition of the URMs would be the ICMJE website itself (as opposed to whichever journal article or supplement had most recently published an update). For example, as of 2004, the editors of Haematologica decided simply to invite their authors to visit www.icmje.org for the 2003 revision of the Uniform Requirements.

Since the early to mid-2000s, the United States National Library of Medicine (which runs MEDLINE and PubMed) has hosted the ICMJE's "Sample References" pages. Around 2007, the NLM created Citing Medicine, its style guide for citation style, as a new home for the style's details. The ICMJE Recommendations now point to Citing Medicine as the home for the formatting details of Vancouver style. For example, in the December 2013 edition of the ICMJE Recommendations, the relevant paragraph is IV.A.3.g.ii. (References > Style and Format).

== Usage ==
=== Labelling citations ===
References are numbered consecutively in order of appearance in the text – they are identified by Arabic numerals in parentheses (1), square brackets [1], superscript^{1}, or a combination^{[1]}. The number usually appears at the end of the material it supports, and an entry in the reference list would give full bibliographical information for the source:

Blood loss and the number of patients requiring post-operative blood transfusions were significantly greater, but operation and fluoroscopy times were significantly shorter, for the DHS versus the PFNA group^{[1]}.

And the entry in the reference list would be:

1. Xu YZ, Geng DC, Mao HQ, et al. (2010). "A comparison of the proximal femoral nail antirotation device and dynamic hip screw in the treatment of unstable pertrochanteric fracture". The Journal of International Medical Research. 38 (4): 1266–1275. doi:10.1177/147323001003800408. PMID 20925999. S2CID 20812098.

=== Placing citations ===
Several descriptions of the Vancouver system say that the number can be placed outside the text punctuation to avoid disruption to the flow of the text, or be placed inside the text punctuation, and that there are different cultures in different traditions. The first method is recommended by some universities and colleges, while the latter method is required by scientific publications such as the The MLA Style Manual (MLA) and IEEE except for in the end of a block quotation. (IEEE are using Vancouver style labels within brackets, for example [1] to cite the first reference in the list, but otherwise refer to Chicago Style Manual.) The original Vancouver system documents (the ICMJE recommendations and Uniform Requirements for Manuscripts Submitted to Biomedical Journals) do not discuss placement of the citation mark.

=== Format of citations ===
Different formats exist for different types of sources, e.g. books, journal articles, etc.

==== Format of names ====
Formatting for all names (e.g., authors, editors, etc.) is the same.

General rules for names:

- List names in the order they appear in the text
- Enter surname (family or last name) first for each author
- Capitalize surnames and enter spaces within surnames as they appear in the document cited on the assumption that the author approved the form used. For example: Van Der Horn or van der Horn; De Wolf or de Wolf or DeWolf.
- Convert given (first) names and middle names to initials, for a maximum of two initials following each surname
- Give all authors, regardless of the number
- Separate author names from each other by a comma and a space
- End author information with a period
- See exceptions for author in Appendix F: Notes for Citing MEDLINE/PubMed.

Although Citing Medicine does not explicitly mandate merging initials (for example, "R. K." would be merged into "RK"), the examples used throughout the book do.

(This truncation of given names reduces the identifiability of authors who happen to have common names.)

==== Journal articles ====
===== Standard journal articles =====
- Leurs R, Church MK, Taglialatela M. H_{1}-antihistamines: inverse agonism, anti-inflammatory actions and cardiac effects. Clin Exp Allergy. 2002 Apr;32(4):489–498.
- Tashiro J, Yamaguchi S, Ishii T, Suzuki A, Kondo H, Morita Y, Hara K, Koyama I. Inferior oncological prognosis of surgery without oral chemotherapy for stage III colon cancer in clinical settings. World J Surg Oncol. 2014 May 10;12(1):145. [Epub ahead of print]

As an option, if a journal carries continuous pagination throughout a volume (as many medical journals do), the month and issue number may be omitted.

- Thomas MC. Diuretics, ACE inhibitors and NSAIDs – the triple whammy. Med J Aust. 2000;172:184–185.

The NLM lists all authors for all articles, because it is appropriate for capturing all authors and all of their publications in the MEDLINE database to be found by searches. However, in the reference lists of articles, most journals truncate the list after 3 or 6 names, followed by "et al." (which most medical journals do not italicize):

- Guilbert TW, Morgan WJ, Zeiger RS, Mauger DT, Boehmer SJ, Szefler SJ, et al. Long-term inhaled corticosteroids in preschool children at high risk for asthma. N Engl J Med. 2006 May 11;354(19):1985–1997.

Optionally, a unique identifier (such as the article's digital object identifier (DOI) or PubMed identifier (PMID) may be added to the citation:

- von Itzstein M, Wu WY, Kok GB, Pegg MS, Dyason JC, Jin B, et al. Rational design of potent sialidase-based inhibitors of influenza virus replication. Nature. 1993 Jun 3;363(6428):418–423. PMID 8502295.

NLM elides ending page numbers and uses a hyphen as the range indicating character (184-5). Some journals do likewise, whereas others expand the ending page numbers in full (184–185), use an en dash instead of a hyphen (184–5), or both (184–185).

Virtually all medical journal articles are published online. Many are published online only, and many others are published online ahead of print. For the date of online publication, at the end of the citation NLM puts "[Epub Year Mon Day]" (for online-only publication) or "[Epub ahead of print]" for online ahead of print (with the month and day following the year in its normal position). In contrast, AMA style puts "[published online Month Day, Year]" at the end of the article title. It no longer uses the term "Epub" and no longer includes the words "ahead of print". It omits the year from its normal location after the journal title abbreviation if there is no print data to give (online-only publication).

The titles of journals are abbreviated. There are no periods in the abbreviation. A period comes after the abbreviation, delimiting it from the next field. The abbreviations are standardized. The standardization was formerly incomplete and internal to organizations such as NLM. It is now formalized at the supraorganizational level (see also: ANSI Z39.5 and ISO 4: Information and documentation – Rules for the abbreviation of title words and titles of publications).

===== Articles not in English =====
As per journal articles in English:

- Forneau E, Bovet D. Recherches sur l'action sympathicolytique d'un nouveau dérivé du dioxane. Arch Int Pharmacodyn. 1933;46:178–191. French.

The NLM adds an English translation of the title enclosed in square brackets right after the title. The language is specified in full after the location (pagination), followed by a period.

==== Books ====
Surname Initial(s). Book title. Edition – if available: Publisher, place of publication; Year.

===== Personal author(s) =====
- Rang HP, Dale MM, Ritter JM, Moore PK. Pharmacology. 5th ed. Edinburgh: Churchill Livingstone; 2003.

===== Editor(s) or compiler(s) as authors =====
- Beers MH, Porter RS, Jones TV, Kaplan JL, Berkwits M, editors. The Merck manual of diagnosis and therapy. 18th ed. Whitehouse Station (NJ): Merck Research Laboratories; 2006.

===== Authored chapter in edited publication =====
- Glennon RA, Dukat M. Serotonin receptors and drugs affecting serotonergic neurotransmission. In: Williams DA, Lemke TL, editors. Foye's principles of medicinal chemistry. 5th ed. Philadelphia: Lippincott Williams & Wilkins; 2002.

==== Electronic material ====
- World Health Organization (WHO). Mortality country fact sheet 2006 [internet]. Geneva: WHO; 2006. Available from: www.who.int/whosis/mort_emro_pak_pakistan.pdf
