= Camille Noûs =

Fictional name of academic project RogueESR

Camille Noûs is a fictional name assumed by the French collective academic project RogueESR. The character of "Camille Noûs" was created in 2020 when the group signed an open letter concerning French science policy. In 2021, "Camille Noûs" was listed as an author on 180 journal papers in several scientific disciplines.

== Background ==
The intent of the Camille Noûs character has been described as a protest against changes in research culture, including the rise of temporary academic positions, the decline in researcher job security and tenure protections, and research assessment metrics that emphasise citation numbers.

The Camille Noûs campaign has been criticized as "ethically questionable" due to concerns about responsibility and accountability for research results. There has also been criticism that has arisen from some researchers including Camille Noûs on the author list without informing journal editors that it is a fictitious name.

The intention of the Camille Noûs character is to protest individualism in scientific research, and to promote collaboration over individual accomplishment.

In April 2021, a manifesto by Camille Noûs was published on the science blog 3 Quarks Daily.

== See also ==
- Citation impact
- Scientific citation

== Sources ==
- Noûs, Camille (19 April 2021). "We, Camille Noûs – Research As A Common". 3 Quarks Daily.
- O'Grady, Cathleen (16 March 2021). "Who is Camille Noûs, the fictitious French researcher with nearly 200 papers?". Science.
