= Wenceslao Díaz Gallegos =

Chilean scientist and medical surgeon

- Born: February 21, 1834; Hacienda Limache, Chile
- Died: January 19, 1895 (aged 60)
- Education: Universidad de Chile
- Known for: work on sanitation introduction of medical devices
- Medical career
- Profession: Surgeon philosopher
- Sub-specialties: health geography
- Notable works: Revista Médica de Chile

Wenceslao Díaz Gallegos (1834–1895) was a Chilean scientist and medical surgeon, widely considered one of the fathers of sanitation in the country. He trained generations of medical professionals and introduced medical devices, such as the thermometer and the hypodermic syringe, for the first time in Chile. Díaz made numerous contributions to Chilean medicine and natural history, and was also a skilled linguist in several languages.

== Early life and education ==
He was born in Hacienda Limache, near San Fernando, on February 21, 1834. He studied at Colegio Taforó in Santiago and later finished high school education at the Instituto Nacional.

Díaz graduated as a medical surgeon in 1859, at the Universidad de Chile School of Medicine, when it was located on the building in the intersection of San Francisco and Las Delicias, the current Libertador General Bernardo O’Higgins Avenue. Two years later, he graduated as a Bachelor in Physical Sciences and Mathematics at the same university. His specialization allowed him to lead the sanitary commission to help the victims of the 1861 Mendoza earthquake.

== Contributions to natural history ==
Díaz studied many diverse disciplines such as medicine, archeology, geology, botany, seismology, climatology, ethnography and philosophy, and specialized in health geography, considered a prerequisite to specialization in parasitology and tropical diseases. He went on scientific excursions with the geologist Ignacio Domeyko, and collected botanical specimens. The Chilean botanist Rudolfo Amando Philippi named at least seven different species of plants in his honor, including: Alstroemeria diazii Phil., Boopis diazii Phil., Cerastium diazii Phil., Panargyrus diazii Phil., Schizanthus diazii Phil., Ourisia diazii Phil., and Senecio diazii Phil.

== Career ==
In 1873 he was appointed head of the chair of internal medicine at the Universidad de Chile School of Medicine. From that position he pushed the introduction of modern medical instruments like the thermometer and the hypodermic syringe, which was used to administer morphine, atropine and cocaine in the treatment of patients. Both had never been used before in the country.

Between 1877 and 1880 he was dean of the Faculty of Medicine, where he worked on the design of a new building for the faculty, but he had to leave the project after the outbreak of the War of the Pacific (1879-1883).

During the conflict he took over as Director of the Army Health Service, where he also innovated in hospital systems. After the war, he was one of the leaders in controlling the Asian Cholera epidemic that affected Chile in 1887. He described the main characteristics and consequences of the disease in the medical report “Memory of the Cholera Health Service Directive Commission 1887-1888”.

He was a founding member of the Medical Society of Santiago (1869) and one of the editors of the first issue of its journal, the Revista Médica de Chile (1872). He was also a member of the Society of Pharmacy of Chile, the Surgical Medical Society, the Society of Archeology of Santiago and physician of the San Juan de Dios Hospital in Santiago.

Díaz also stood out as a great connoisseur of the Greek, Latin and Spanish classics. Also a philologist and linguist, he possessed notions of Greek, Latin and other languages. He also studied the native Latin American languages, especially the Mapuche, Quechua and Aymará.

Díaz died on January 19, 1895.
