= Author citation =

In taxonomy, an author citation refers to the person or group of people who validly published a taxon. The rules and formats of author citations vary in each discipline:

- Author citation (botany)
- Author citation (zoology)

More generally, "author citation" may also refer to author-date referencing, a type of parenthetical referencing.
