= Pienta =

Pienta is a surname. Notable people with the surname include:

- Kenneth J. Pienta (fl. from 1983), American urologist
- Norbert Pienta (born 1952), American chemist
