= Level of detail =

Level of detail (LOD) may refer to:

- Level of detail (writing), the level of abstraction in written works
- Level of detail (computer graphics), the complexity of a 3D model representation
