= MSTP =

MSTP may stand for:

- MAGTF Staff Training Program
- Medical Scientist Training Program
- Microsoft Manual of Style for Technical Publications
- Multiple Spanning Tree Protocol
- Mesh Semantic Transfer Protocol
