= Citationality =

One author's citation of other authors' works

In literary theory, citationality is an author's citation (quoting) of other authors' works. Some works are highly citational (making frequent use of numerous allusion to and quotations from other works), while others seem to exist in a vacuum, without explicit references to other authors or texts. Some writers, such as the Argentinian writer Jorge Luis Borges, are highly citational; he frequently included citations and footnotes in his stories, many of which were entirely made up. Citationality is often seen as a typical feature of postmodernism, especially in its pop culture manifestations (consider how frequently a television show like The Simpsons or Mystery Science Theater 3000 makes use of quotes and citations).

== Iterability ==
In critical theory, citationality sometimes refers to Jacques Derrida's notion of iterability from his essay "Signature Event Context", where he argued that the essential feature of a signature was that it had a recognizable form and could be repeated. As soon as a signature has a recognizable and repeatable form, however, it can also be copied or counterfeited. In other words, although a signature is supposed to testify to the presence of an authentic original intention, it simultaneously sets up the possibility of an inauthentic copy.

Derrida's concept—which he denies is a concept simply because from the moment that the concept enters the game, it has become motivated—emerges from his engagement with J. L. Austin's problematic claim that a "nonserious" performative utterance, as uttered in a play or a poem, say, is "parasitic" upon the true performative and cannot be considered legitimate. Thus, as Austin put it, if an actor playing a minister in a play says to two actors playing a bride and groom, "I now pronounce you husband and wife," the actors are not thereby married. As Derrida recognizes, this is not only a non-problem—the actors are not thereby married, obviously, but the characters are—but the very nature of citing, reiterating, reusing a phrase, reperforming a performative utterance is at the heart of the communicative function of language.

Judith Butler later took up this same notion and applied it to gender studies, arguing that gender is essentially a performance, a citation of all previous performances of gender. Rather than testifying to an innate and natural character of a person (as masculine or feminine), gender testifies to the possibility of inauthentic or parodic citations of gender (as, for example, in a drag performance).
