= Level of detail (writing) =

Term in writing

Level of detail in writing, sometimes known as level of abstraction, refers to three concepts: the precision in using the right words to form phrases, clauses and sentences; the generality of statements; and the organisational strategy in which authors arrange ideas according to a common topic in the hierarchy of detail. Placing different objects or ideas in categories is a type of classification in expert writing which allows more efficient cognitive retrieval of information by placing it in context. Maintaining appropriate level of detail in any body of text is a part of ensuring that the cognitive effort required by the reader is appropriate to the general subject of the written as a whole. Authors use level of detail to maintain continuity in syntactic hierarchy in texts, such as a screenplays. Continuity in text is achieved by using transitional expressions to move from one detail, or level of detail, to another.

Within the basic writing structure of introducing, characterising and bringing to a close of any proper subject description, level of detail is used in theme development during elaboration, evaluation and adding context as a repertoire of retrieval strategies. Van der Pool in 1995 had found that omission of detail in text structuring is an age-related effect that differentiates mature and young writers.

Although the general rule that the level of detail must be both sufficient and appropriate for the author's audience and their subject in literature intended for experts, it is also used in primary and secondary education to assess student understanding. In general the depth of detail is gradually developed to one appropriate for the subject.

The suggested list in identifying appropriate level of detail may include

- Sufficiency of information for the reader to exercise good judgement about the subject
- Sufficiency of information for the reader to take appropriate action
- Correctness of the information based on type of data
- Correctness of the information based on audience
- Level of detail appropriateness to the subject
- Level of detail appropriateness to the audience in size, required knowledge for comprehension or experience

Presenting the reader with specific details without first introducing it with general statements can be dangerous because it omits a qualifier, and therefore introduces elements that invite questions and create confusion.

Level of detail is often important in technical writing due to the need to differentiate between different levels of audience need for information within the organisation.

Similar to the engineering design process, writing also takes place by the author usually adopting either a top-down or a bottom-up process by identifying components of the text that become the focus subjects in the overall theme.

The content of a text is often assessed for its level of detail as high, intermediate or low based on the objective of the author in addressing the needs of the audience. The highly detailed text refers to the bottom-up structuring design where

Facts that are generally available but not used frequently (and likely to be forgotten) should be included in this ideal level of writing.

This level of detail is appropriate for the subjects where expert specialist knowledge and understanding are required, and is often used in technical and scientific writing, or in literary genres like science fiction, biographical writing or military history.
