= ACS style =

Standards for writing documents relating to chemistry

The ACS Style is a set of standards for writing documents relating to chemistry, including a standard method of citation in academic publications, developed by the American Chemical Society (ACS).

Previous editions of the ACS style manual are entitled ACS Style Guide: Effective Communication of Scientific Information, 3rd ed. (2006), edited by Anne M. Coghill and Lorrin R. Garson, and ACS Style Guide: A Manual for Authors and Editors (1997).

As of 2020, ACS style guidance and best practices for scholarly communication in the sciences are incorporated into the ACS Guide to Scholarly Communication, edited by Gregory M. Banik, Grace Baysinger, Prashant V. Kamat, and Norbert Pienta. The Guide is published online by ACS Publications.

== Citation format ==
Abbreviations

Titles of journals are abbreviated; e.g.:

- J. Am. Chem. Soc. – Journal of the American Chemical Society
- J. Phys. Chem. – Journal of Physical Chemistry
- J. Phys. Chem. A – Journal of Physical Chemistry (A, B, or C)
- J. Org. Chem. – Journal of Organic Chemistry
- Org. Lett. – Organic Letters
- Phys. Rev. Lett. – Physical Review Letters
- Tetrahedron – Tetrahedron
- Tetrahedron Lett. – Tetrahedron Letters
- Acc. Chem. Res. – Accounts of Chemical Research

Article published in a journal

- Last Name, First Initial.; Last Name, First Initial. "Title". Journal, Year, Volume (issue), Pages.

Example of a journal citation

Deno, N. C.; Richey, H. G.; Liu, J. S.; Lincoln, D. N.; Turner, J. O. "Carbonium Ions. XIX. The Intense Conjugation in Cyclopropyl Carbonium Ions". J. Am. Chem. Soc., 1965, 87 (20), 4533–4538.

The red texts are optional.

== See also ==
- AIP style
- IEEE style
