= Citing Medicine =

Style guide

Citing Medicine: The NLM Style Guide for Authors, Editors, and Publishers is the style guide of the United States National Library of Medicine (NLM). Its main focus is citation style and bibliographic style. The citation style of Citing Medicine is the current incarnation of the Vancouver system, per the References > Style and Format section of the ICMJE Recommendations (formerly called the Uniform Requirements for Manuscripts Submitted to Biomedical Journals). Citing Medicine style is the style used by MEDLINE and PubMed.

The introduction section of Citing Medicine explains that "three major sources are utilized in compiling Citing Medicine: the MEDLARS Indexing Manual of the National Library of Medicine (NLM); pertinent NISO standards, primarily ANSI/NISO Z39.29-2005 Bibliographic References; and relevant standards from the International Organization for Standardization (ISO), primarily ISO 690 Documentation - Bibliographic References."
