= AIP style =

Manual of Style by AIP

The AIP Style is a manual of style created and developed by the American Institute of Physics. It is the most common style used in physics publications.

== AIP Style Guide ==
The AIP Style Guide is the book that defines the AIP style. It is distributed for free by AIP on their website in the section Featured Resources for Researchers. The most recent version is the 4th edition, published in 1990. The 1st edition was published in 1951, at the request of the AIP Publication Board.

=== Editions ===
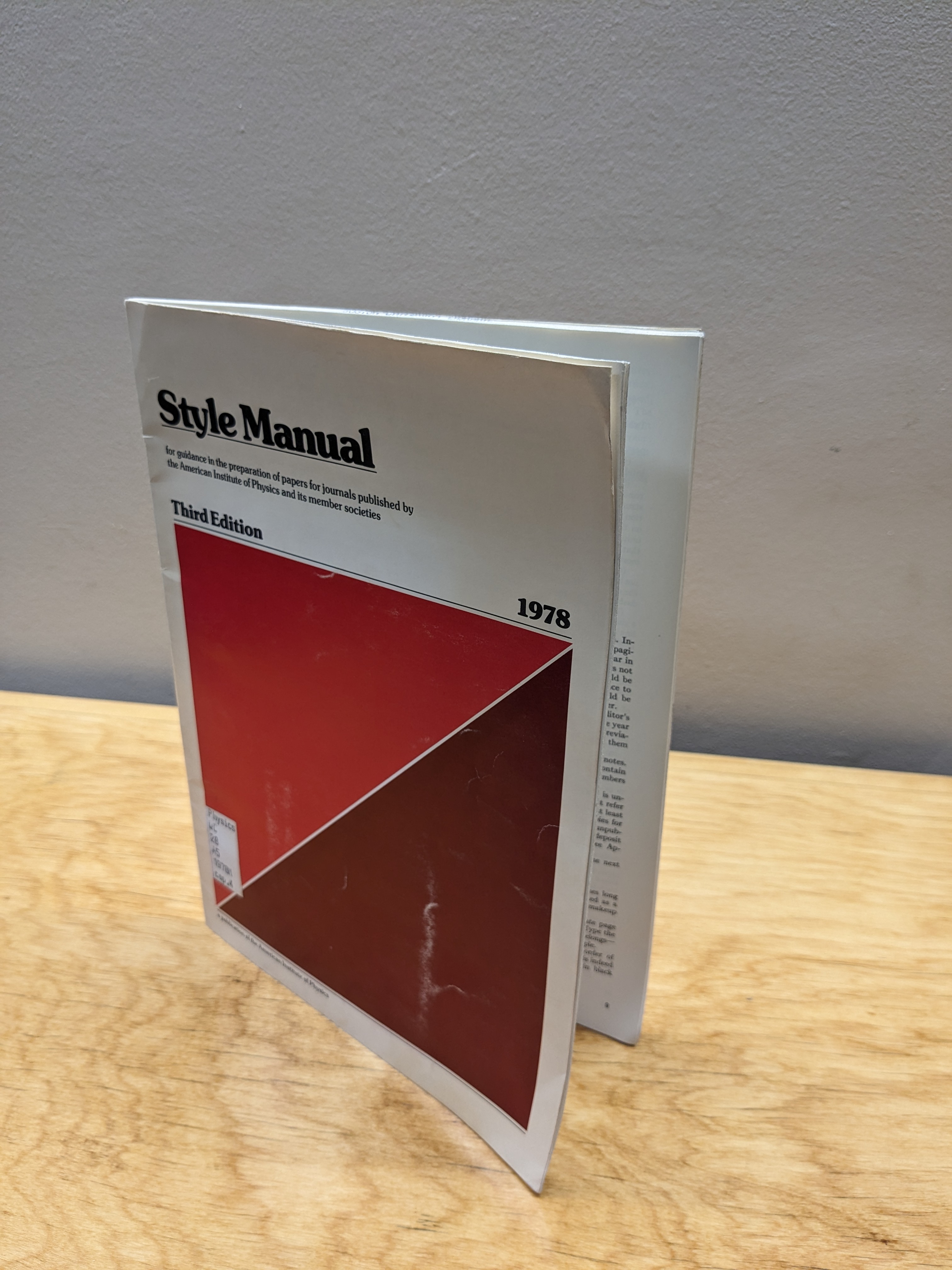
Paperback AIP Style Manual 3ed (1978), standing upright.

The following editions, revisions, reprints have been realized:

- AIP Style Manual, 1ed, 1951
- AIP Style Manual, 2ed, 1959 (revisions 1963, 1965, 1967, 1968, 1969, 1970, 1973)
- AIP Style Manual, 3ed, 1978
- AIP Style Manual, 4ed, 1990
- 5th printing, 1997

=== Organization ===
The 4th edition is organized as follows:

- Preface
- I. Summary information for journal contributors (pp. 1–2)
- II. Preparing a scientific paper for publication (pp. 3–11)
- III. General style (pp. 12–19)
- IV. Mathematical expressions (pp. 20–25)
- V. Figures (pp. 26–30)
- Appendices
  - Appendix A: Statements of editorial policy for AIP and member-society journals (pp. 31–34)
  - Appendix B: Correct or preferred spellings of frequently occurring words (pp. 35–37)
  - Appendix C: Units of measure (pp. 38–40)
  - Appendix D: Standard abbreviations (pp. 41–42)
  - Appendix E: Alphabets available for typesetting (p. 43)
  - Appendix F: Special symbols available for typesetting (pp. 44–45)
  - Appendix G: Journal title abbreviations (pp. 46–54)
  - Appendix H: Symbols used in correcting proof (p. 55)
- Bibliography (p. 62)
- Index (pp. 63–64)
- 1997 Addendum to fourth edition of AIP Style Manual (pp. A1—A4)

== AIP citation format ==
The AIP Style Guide includes a definition of the AIP citation format, via TABLE II of the "10. Footnotes and references" section of Chapter II. They are also covered in C. Lipson's Cite Right, as well as in a document by Taylor & Francis, and by various university library resources.

Various reference management software include modules to export sources to AIP citation format, including Zotero and EndNote.

=== Journal articles ===
For journal articles, some examples of proper AIP citation formats are reproduced below:

- K. F. Mak et al., Phys. Rev. Lett. **105**, 136805 (2010).
- K. F. Mak et al., Phys. Rev. Lett. **105** (13), 136805 (2010).
- K. F. Mak, C. Lee, J. Hone, J. Shan, and T. F. Heinz, Phys. Rev. Lett. **105**, 136805 (2010).

Some of the criteria include

- Title of article is excluded.
- Journal abbreviation is used, per its ISO 4. (Appendix G of AIP Style Manual includes a list of journal abbreviations.)
- The blue is optional but usually contains the hyperlink to the online version of the article.
- Volume number is in boldface.
- Issue number can be specified in parentheses but is not required.
- Year is last and in parentheses.

== Relation to APS and ACS styles ==
While the American Physical Society (APS) has its own style guide defined via the document Physical Review Style and Notation Guide, it still uses the AIP citation format and follows much of the style conventions of the AIP style. In chemistry, there is the ACS style, created and developed by the American Chemical Society (ACS).

== See also ==
- ACS style
- IEEE style
- Chicago Manual of Style
