= IEEE style =

Style guide for writing research papers

The Institute of Electrical and Electronics Engineers (IEEE) style is a widely accepted format for writing research papers, commonly used in technical fields, particularly in computer science. IEEE style is based on the Chicago Style. In IEEE style, citations are numbered, but citation numbers are included in the text in square brackets rather than as superscripts. All bibliographical information is exclusively included in the list of references at the end of the document, next to the respective citation number.

== See also ==
- AIP style
- ACS style
