= ICMJE recommendations =

Guidelines for medical journal editors

International Committee of Medical Journal Editors Recommendations
- Recommendations for the Conduct, Reporting, Editing, and Publication of Scholarly Work in Medical Journals
- Abbreviation: ICMJE Recommendations
- Formation: 1979
- Parent organization: International Committee of Medical Journal Editors (ICMJE); Vancouver Group (formerly)
- Website: https://www.icmje.org/recommendations/
- Formerly called: Uniform Requirements for Manuscripts Submitted to Biomedical Journals (URMs)

The ICMJE recommendations (full title, "Recommendations for the Conduct, Reporting, Editing, and Publication of Scholarly Work in Medical Journals") are a set of guidelines produced by the International Committee of Medical Journal Editors for standardising the ethics, preparation and formatting of manuscripts submitted to biomedical journals for publication. Compliance with the ICMJE recommendations is required by most leading biomedical journals. Levels of real compliance are subject to debate. As of 9 January 2020, 5570 journals worldwide claim to follow the ICMJE recommendations.

The recommendations were first issued in 1979 under the title "Uniform Requirements for Manuscripts Submitted to Biomedical Journals" (abbreviated URMs and often shortened to "Uniform Requirements"). After a series of revisions, they were given their current name in 2013.

== International Committee of Medical Journal Editors ==
The International Committee of Medical Journal Editors (ICMJE) was originally known as the Vancouver Group, after the location of their first meeting in Vancouver, British Columbia in Canada. As of 2017 members of the ICMJE are:

- Annals of Internal Medicine
- BMJ
- Bulletin of the World Health Organization
- Deutsches Ärzteblatt
- Journal of the American Medical Association (JAMA)
- New England Journal of Medicine
- Public Library of Science
- Journal of Korean Medical Science
- Medwave
- The Lancet
- The National Medical Journal of India
- The U.S. National Library of Medicine
- The New Zealand Medical Journal
- The World Association of Medical Editors
- Ugeskrift for Læger (Danish Medical Journal)

== Citation style ==
The citation style recommended by the ICMJE Recommendations, which is also known as the Vancouver system, is the style used by the United States National Library of Medicine (NLM), codified in Citing Medicine.

References are numbered consecutively in order of appearance in the text – they are identified by Arabic numerals enclosed in parentheses.

Example of a journal citation:

- Leurs R, Church MK, Taglialatela M. H_{1}-antihistamines: inverse agonism, anti-inflammatory actions and cardiac effects. Clin Exp Allergy 2002 Apr;32(4):489–498.

== Manuscripts describing human interventional clinical trials ==
URM includes a mandate for manuscripts describing human interventional trials to register a trial in a clinical trial registry (e.g., ClinicalTrials.gov) and to include the trial registration ID in the abstract of the article. The URM also requires that this registration is done prior enrolling the first participant. A study of five high impact factor journals (founders of ICMJE) showed that only 89% of published articles (articles published during 2010–2011; about trials that completed in 2008) were properly registered prior enrolling the first participant.

A 2016 draft proposal to require that manuscript authors disclose individual patient data relevant to published outcomes within six months of reporting a clinical trial was successfully opposed by Jeffrey M. Drazen, then editor-in-chief of The New England Journal of Medicine. Drazen's claim that "'a new class of research person will emerge,' one who might 'even use the data to try to disprove what the original investigators had posited'" was criticized as protecting intentionally deceptive biomedical researchers.

== Disclosure of competing interests ==
The ICMJE also developed a uniform format for disclosure of competing interests in journal articles.

== Grey literature ==
The Uniform Requirements were adapted by the Grey Literature International Steering Committee GLISC for the production of scientific and technical reports included in the wider category of grey literature. These GLISC Guidelines for the production of scientific and technical reports are translated to French, German, Italian and Spanish and are available on the GLISC website .

== See also ==
- Conflicts of interest in academic publishing
- EASE Guidelines for Authors and Translators of Scientific Articles
- IMRAD
- Scientific misconduct
