= Drive-by citation =

Problematic type of academic referencing

A drive-by citation is an academic citation that lists sources without engaging with them. A typical drive-by citation is a single sentence making a claim backed up by one or often a series of references where no clear explanation is given of how a specific citation supports the claim being made. The use of "drive-by" references drive-by shootings, where the shooter immediately flees the scene.

Drive-by citations avoid engagement with the sources that are cited. Nancy Mack used the term in a 2006 article about how to help working-class students develop authoritative voices as writers, where she argued that drive-by citations hinder this by avoiding dialogue with other scholars: "I eschew what I characterize as the “drive-by” citation method in which students fire off the words of an unnamed expert without any explanation. My goal is for students to engage in a responsive dialogue with a scholar."

Drive-by citations may skew citation counts, which can affect scientific journals' impact factor and the citation counts of individual scholars. This type of citation also "runs the risk of misinterpretation, remaining surface level, or never adequately engaging with the issues at hand."

Drive-by citations are more likely to reference well-known or heavily cited works, which can increase the Matthew effect where scholars who are already cited a lot tend to get cited even more. In 2012, R.S. Hawkshaw, S. Hawkshaw and U.R. Sumaila argued this can lead to chains of misunderstanding. Their example is the term tragedy of the commons, which they show is frequently misapplied in scholarship to mean the opposite of what its originator, Garrett Hardin, meant when he coined it in 1968. Hawkshaw et al. argue that this error is made because Hardin's paper on the topic is cited widely and is "a victim of drive-by citation."
