= Microsoft Manual of Style =

Formerly published document by Microsoft

The Microsoft Manual of Style: Your Everyday Guide to Usage, Terminology, and Style for Professional Technical Communications (MSTP), in former editions the Microsoft Manual of Style for Technical Publications, was a style guide published by Microsoft. The fourth edition, ISBN 0-7356-4871-9, was published in 2012. Microsoft employees and partners also had access to a Microsoft Compressed HTML Help (CHM) version.

In 2018, the book was replaced by a website, the Microsoft Writing Style Guide, joining other online guides like the Apple Style Guide and Google Developer Documentation Style Guide.

== History ==
- First Edition: Published in 1995 (ISBN 1-55615-939-0)
- Second Edition: Published in June 1998 (ISBN 1-57231-890-2)
- Third Edition: Published in June 2004 (ISBN 0-7356-1746-5)
- Fourth Edition: Published in January 2012 (ISBN 0-7356-4871-9)

== Purpose ==
Like any style guide, the MSTP establishes standards and serves as a reference for writers. The MSTP has the specific purpose of guiding technical writers, editors, and content managers working with Microsoft products. While the manual in some parts focuses on usage particular to these products, the guide also serves as a general tool for technical writers. Content ranges from specific instructions for naming particular elements of specific programs to general rules of grammar.

== Contents ==
The MSTP is divided into two parts, preceded by a foreword and introduction.

Part 1 is titled "General Topics" and is sub-divided into the following 11 chapters:

1. Content for the web: Defines parameters for all types of web content, including web, video, blog, international considerations and accessibility and legal considerations.
2. Microsoft style and voice: Basic principles and style guide.
3. Content for a worldwide audience: Provides instructions for ensuring that documents will be understood throughout the world by avoiding local references and making texts easy to translate.
4. Accessible Content: Talks about accessibility in all areas including design, graphics and text; refers to acceptable terminology.
5. The user interface: Provides standardized names for elements of the Microsoft user interface.
6. Procedures and technical content: Provides guidelines for consistent formatting of procedures and other technical content to help users find important information quickly and efficiently
7. Practical issues of style: Points out common problems ranging from capitalization to the formatting of style elements such as dates, numbers, and measurements.
8. Grammar: Contains sections on the general usage of verbs and nouns.
9. Punctuation: Contains information about using punctuation.
10. Indexes and keywords: Provides guidelines for indexing and/or attributing content to ensure that it is discoverable for users.
11. Acronyms and other abbreviations: Provides guidelines on consistent use of acronyms and abbreviations, including how and when to use them to avoid confusion. It also contains a list of acronyms and abbreviations.

Part 2 is an alphabetically arranged "Usage Dictionary" of terms commonly used in technical writing.
