= Science information on Wikipedia =

Information about science presented on Wikipedia

Science information on Wikipedia includes the information that Wikipedia presents about science. There have been critiques of and discussions about the impact and quality of that information, and of the interactions of Wikipedia editors, scientists, and public engagement with the information.

== Impact ==
A 2016 study found evidence that Wikipedia increases the distribution and impact of open access science publications. A 2017 study found evidence that Wikipedia's popularity as the most popular general information source has influenced how everyone talks and writes about science. UNESCO reported in 2017 that Wikipedia is a popular source of science information because of its high ranking in search engines. A 2018 study examined the way that Wikipedia integrates new scientific information.

== Editors ==
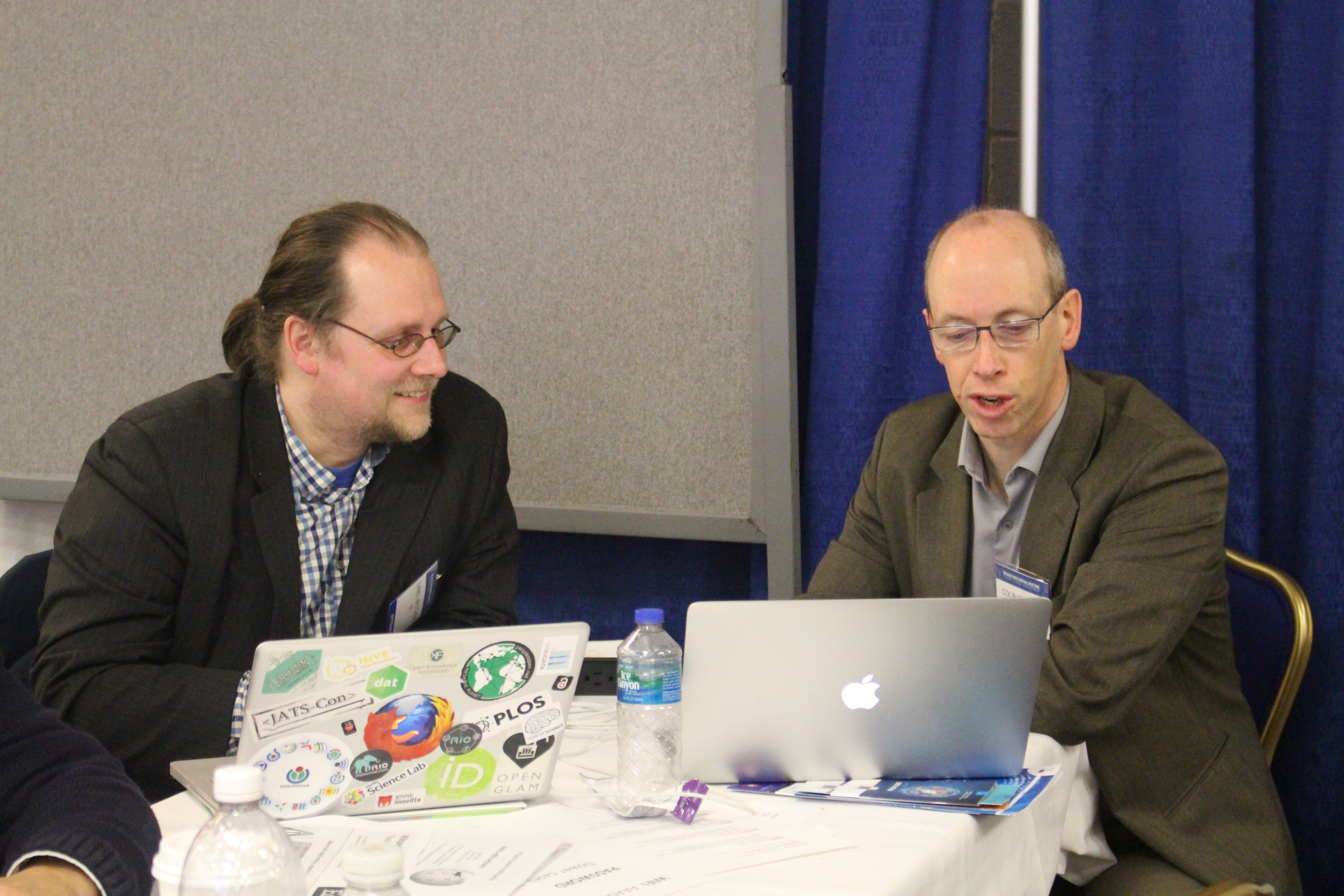
An exchange at the Wikipedia space at the 2016 annual meeting of the AAAS

In 2016 the Wiki Education Foundation and the Simons Foundation presented an outreach program called the "Year of Science". In this program, Wikipedia educators visited academic conferences and invited scientists to contribute information from their field of expertise to Wikipedia. Some universities have programs to encourage students to edit Wikipedia's science articles as part of the learning experience. The Wikipedia community invites academics to edit Wikipedia articles. Various academic societies have encouraged their membership to edit Wikipedia.

== Quantity and quality ==
A study in 2017 determined that: "Depending on the definition and methods used, roughly 10–20% of Wikipedia articles are on scientific topics (0.5–1.0 million out of about 5 million)."

Wikipedia has a broad and diverse practice of citing scientific publications of all fields. A 2005 study published in the journal Nature compared 40 Wikipedia articles on science topics to their Encyclopædia Britannica counterpart. Subject experts found four "serious errors" in each encyclopedia. They also found 162 less serious problems in Wikipedia, and 123 in Britannica. A popular science writer for Vice complained in 2017 that Wikipedia's science articles were too technical. Various scientists and media organizations have questioned and critiqued the extent to which Wikipedia articles on science influence political decisions relating to science.

== See also ==
- Academic studies about Wikipedia
- Health information on Wikipedia
- Open science
- Public awareness of science
