= Parenthetical referencing =

Citation system

Parenthetical referencing is a citation system in which in-text citations are made using parentheses. They are usually accompanied by a full, alphabetized list of citations in an end section, usually titled "references", "reference list", "works cited", or "end-text citations". Parenthetical referencing can be used in lieu of footnote citations or the numbered Vancouver system.

Parenthetical referencing normally uses one of these two citation styles:

- Author–date (also known as Harvard referencing): primarily used in the natural sciences and social sciences, espoused by systems such as APA style;
- Author–title or author–page: primarily used in the arts and the humanities, such as in the MLA Handbook.

Both the author–date and author–title systems are also available in style guides such as The Chicago Manual of Style.

== Author–date (Harvard referencing) ==
In the author–date method (Harvard referencing), the in-text citation is placed in parentheses after the sentence or part thereof that the citation supports. The citation includes the author's name, year of publication, and page number(s) when a specific part of the source is referred to (Smith 2008, p. 1) or (Smith 2008:1). A full citation is given in the references section: Smith, John (2008). Name of Book. Name of Publisher.

=== How to cite ===
The structure of a citation under the author–date method is the author's surname, year of publication, and page number or range, in parentheses, as in "(Smith 2010, p. 1)".

- The page number or page range may be omitted if the entire work is cited, as in "(Smith 2010)".
- Narrative style citations have the author appearing as part of the regular text sentence, outside parentheses, as in: "Jones (2001) revolutionized the field of trauma surgery."
- Two authors are cited using "and" or "&": (Deane and Jones 1991) or (Deane & Jones 1991). More than two authors are cited using "et al.": (Smith et al. 1992).
- In some documentation systems (e.g., MLA style), an unknown date is cited as having "no date of publication" by the abbreviation for "no date" (Deane, n.d.).
- In such documentation systems, works without pagination are referred to in the References list as "not paginated" with the abbreviation for that phrase (n. pag.).
- "No place of publication" and/or "no publisher" are both designated the same way (n.p.) and placed in the appropriate spot in the bibliographical citation (Harvard Referencing. N.p.).
- A reference to a republished work is cited with the original publication date either in square brackets (Marx [1867] 1967, p. 90) or separated with a slash (Marx, 1867/1967, p. 90). The inclusion of the original publication year qualifies the suggestion otherwise that the publication originally occurred in 1967.
- If an author published several books in 2005, the year of the first publication (in the alphabetic order of the references) is cited and referenced as 2005a, the second as 2005b and so on.
- A citation is placed wherever appropriate in or after the sentence. If it is at the end of a sentence, it is placed before the period, but a citation for an entire block quote immediately follows the period at the end of the block since the citation is not an actual part of the quotation itself. When citing quotes it’s advisable to insert the page number as this points directly to the page of the content that has been used.
- Complete citations are provided in alphabetical order in a section following the text, usually designated as "Works cited" or "References." The difference between a "works cited" or "references" list and a bibliography is that a bibliography may include works not directly cited in the text.
- All citations are in the same font as the main text.
- There is no official guide to Harvard citation style, consequently variations occur across various online Harvard citation and referencing guides. For example, some universities instruct students to type a book's publication date without parentheses in the reference list.

=== Examples ===
An example of a journal reference:

- Heilman, J. M. and West, A. G. (2015). "Wikipedia and Medicine: Quantifying Readership, Editors, and the Significance of Natural Language." Journal of Medical Internet Research, 17(3), p. e62. doi:10.2196/jmir.4069.

Following is an explanation of the components, where the coloring is for demonstration purposes and is not used in actual formatting:
Heilman, J. M. and West, A. G. (2015). "Wikipedia and Medicine: Quantifying Readership, Editors, and the Significance of Natural Language." Journal of Medical Internet Research, 17 (3), p.e62. doi:10.2196/jmir.4069.

- Author(s) first listed author's name inverted in the bibliography entry
- Year
- Article title
- Journal title in italic type
- Volume
- Issue
- Page numbers (Note: The Heilman and West example article was published electronically without page numbers.) specific page number in a note; page range in a bibliography entry
- Digital object identifier

Examples of book references are:

- Smith, J. (2005a). Dutch Citing Practices. The Hague: Holland Research Foundation.
- Smith, J. (2005b). Harvard Referencing. London: Jolly Good Publishing.

In giving the city of publication, an internationally well-known city (such as London, The Hague, or New York) is given as the city alone. If the city is not internationally well known, the country (or state and country if in the U.S.) is given.

An example of a newspaper reference:

- Bowcott, Owen (October 18, 2005). "Protests halt online auction to shoot stag", The Guardian.

=== Advantages ===
- The principal advantage of the author–date method is that a reader familiar with a field is likely to recognize a citation without having to check in the references section. This is most useful in fields whose works are commonly known by their date of publication (for example, the sciences and social sciences in which one cites, say, "the 2005 Johns Hopkins study of brain function"), or if the author cited is notorious (for example, HIV denialist Peter Duesberg on the cause of AIDS).
- The use of author–date systems helps the reader easily identify sources that may be outdated.
- If the same source is cited more than once, even a reader unfamiliar with the author may remember the name. It quickly becomes obvious if the publication is relying heavily on a single author or single publication. When many different pages of the same work are cited, the reader does not need to flip back and forth to footnotes or endnotes full of "ibid." citations to discover this fact.
- With the author–date method, there is no renumbering hassle when the order of in-text citations is changed, which can be a scourge of the numbered endnotes system if house style or project style insists that citations never appear out of numerical order. (Computerized reference-management software automates this aspect of the numbered system [for example, Microsoft Word's endnote system, Wikipedia's <ref> system, LaTeX/BibTeX, or various applications marketed to professionals].)
- Parenthetical referencing works well in combination with substantive notes. When the note system is used for source citations, two different systems of note marking and placement are needed—in Chicago Style, for instance, "the citation notes should be numbered and appear as endnotes. The substantive notes, indicated by asterisks and other symbols, appear as footnotes" ("Chicago Manual of Style" 2003, 16.63–64). This approach can be cumbersome in any circumstances. When it is not possible to use footnotes altogether probably because of the publisher's policy, it results in two parallel series of endnotes, which can be confusing to readers. Using parenthetical referencing for sources avoids such a problem.
- The reader can find the in-text author–date citations of a specific work more easily. Finding in-text numbered citations is more difficult because some will not appear if they are included in ranges.
- The author–date method can be more convenient for manuscript/draft preparation, or revisions, that are handled by multiple contributing authors. For example, multiple authors are not necessarily able to use the same reference-management software. As such, it may be a preferred style to be used for submission to journals that allow any reference style before acceptance, such as journals that follow Elsevier's Your Paper Your Way guidelines.

=== Disadvantages ===
- Taking up space and distracting, especially when many works are cited in a single place (which often occurs when reviewing a large body of previous work). Numbered footnotes or endnotes, by contrast, can be combined into a range, e.g. "[27–35]". However this disadvantage is offset by the fact that parenthetical referencing may be economical for the overall document since, for instance, "(Smith 2008: 34)" takes up a small amount of space in a paragraph, whereas the same information would require a whole line in a footnote or endnote.
- In many disciplines in the arts and humanities, date of publication is often not the most important piece of information about a particular work. Thus, in author–date references such as "(Dickens 2003: 10)", the date is essentially redundant or meaningless when read on the page, since works may go through numerous editions or translations long after the original publication. Compare a reference in a science discipline such as "The last survey indicated that four hundred were left in the wild (Jones et al. 2003)", where the date is meaningful. The reader of certain forms of arts and humanities scholarship may thus be better aided by the use of author–title referencing styles such as MLA: for example, "(Dickens Oliver, 10)", where meaningful information is given on the page. Historical scholarship is an exception, since, when citing a primary source, date of publication is meaningful, though in most branches of history footnotes are preferred on other grounds. Generally speaking, however, it is instructive that author–date systems such as Harvard were devised by scientists, whereas author–title systems such as MLA were devised by humanities scholars.
- Similarly, because works are frequently reprinted in many arts and humanities disciplines, different author–date references might refer to the same work. For example, "(Spivak 1985)", "(Spivak 1987)", and "(Spivak 1996)" might all refer to the same essay — and might be better rendered in author–title style as "(Spivak 'Subaltern')". Such ambiguities may be resolved by adding an original date of publication, for example, "(Spivak 1985/1996)", though this is cumbersome and exacerbates the principal disadvantage of parenthetical referencing, namely its distraction for the reader and unattractiveness on the page.
- Rules can be complicated or unclear for non-academic references, particularly those where the personal author is unknown, such as government-issued documents and standards.
- When removing a portion of text which has citations in it, the editor(s) must also check the Reference sections to see if the sources cited in the removed text is used elsewhere in the paper or book, and if not, to delete any reference not actually cited in the text (although this issue can be eliminated by the use of reference manager software).
- The use of the author–date methods (but not author–title) can be confusing when used in monographs about particularly prolific authors. In-text citation and back-of-the-book listings of works arranged by date of publication are conducive to errors and confusion: for example, Harvey 1996a, Harvey 1996b, Harvey 1996c, Harvey 1996d, Harvey 1995a, Harvey 1995b, Harvey 1986a, Harvey 1986b, and so on.
- The mixing of text with frequent parentheses and long strings of numbers is typographically inelegant.
- Most historical journals (apart from economic and social history) use footnotes because of the need for maximum flexibility. Primary source references to archives, etc., involve long and complex information, all of which may be immediately relevant to a serious reader. An interesting example of this arose with the famous work of the anthropologists John and Jean Comaroff, Of Revelation and Revolution which treated historical events from anthropological perspective: although parenthetical references were used for scholarly sources, the authors found it necessary to use notes for the historical archive material they were also using.
- If parenthetical referencing is combined with alphabetic order of author names, studies have demonstrated this can lead to discrimination against authors with last names starting with a letter near the end of the alphabet, for funding and future citations. Some style guides therefore suggest listing the authors chronologically instead.

=== Origins and use ===
The origin of the author–date style is attributed to a paper by Edward Laurens Mark, Hersey professor of anatomy and director of the zoological laboratory at Harvard University, who may have copied it from the cataloguing system used then and now by the library of Harvard's Museum of Comparative Zoology. In 1881 Mark wrote a paper on the embryogenesis of the garden slug, in which he included an author–date citation in parentheses on page 194, the first known instance of such a reference. Until then, according to Eli Chernin writing in the British Medical Journal, references had appeared in inconsistent styles in footnotes, referred to in the text using a variety of printers' symbols, including asterisks and daggers. Chernin writes that a 1903 festschrift dedicated to Mark by 140 students, including Theodore Roosevelt, confirms that the author–date system is attributable to Mark. The festschrift pays tribute to Mark's 1881 paper, writing that it "introduced into zoology a proper fullness and accuracy of citation and a convenient and uniform method of referring from text to bibliography." According to an editorial note in the British Medical Journal in 1945, an unconfirmed anecdote is that the term "Owen system" was introduced by an English visitor to Harvard University library, who was impressed by the citation system and dubbed it "Harvard system" upon his return to England.

Although it originated in biology, it is now more common in humanities, history, and social science. It is favored by a few scientific journals such as The Astrophysical Journal, but the major biology journal Cell announced in 2022 that it was moving away from the Harvard style.

== Author–title ==
In the author–title or author–page method, also referred to as MLA style, the in-text citation is placed in parentheses after the sentence or part thereof that the citation supports, and includes the author's name (a short title only is necessary when there is more than one work by the same author) and a page number where appropriate (Smith 1) or (Smith, Playing 1). (No "p." or "pp." prefaces the page numbers and main words in titles appear in capital letters, following MLA style guidelines.) A full citation is given in the references section.

== Content notes ==
A content note generally contains useful information and explanations that do not fit into the primary text itself. Content notes may be given as footnotes or endnotes or even a combination of both footnotes and endnotes. Such content notes may themselves contain a style of parenthetical referencing, just as the main text does.

== See also ==
- Comparison of reference management software
