= Norbert Pienta =

American chemist

Norbert Pienta (born 1952) is an American chemist currently Professor at University of Georgia and was the editor-in-chief of American Chemical Society's Journal of Chemical Education from 2009 to 2019. His current interests are browser web education research and tutorial and education in schools. He is currently retired.

== Education ==
He earned his B.S. from University of Rochester in 1974 and his Ph.D. degree from University of North Carolina in 1978.

== Selected publications ==
- Linear solvation energy relationships. 7. Correlations between the solvent-donicity and acceptor-number scales and the solvatochromic parameters .pi.*, .alpha., and .beta.
- Photochemistry of alkyl halides. 4. 1-Norbornyl, 1-norbornylmethyl, 1-and 2-adamantyl, and 1-octyl bromides and iodides, Paul J Kropp, Graham S Poindexter, Norbert J Pienta, David C Hamilton, Journal of the American Chemical Society, 1976.
