= AMA Manual of Style =

Academic style and writing format

AMA Manual of Style: A Guide for Authors and Editors
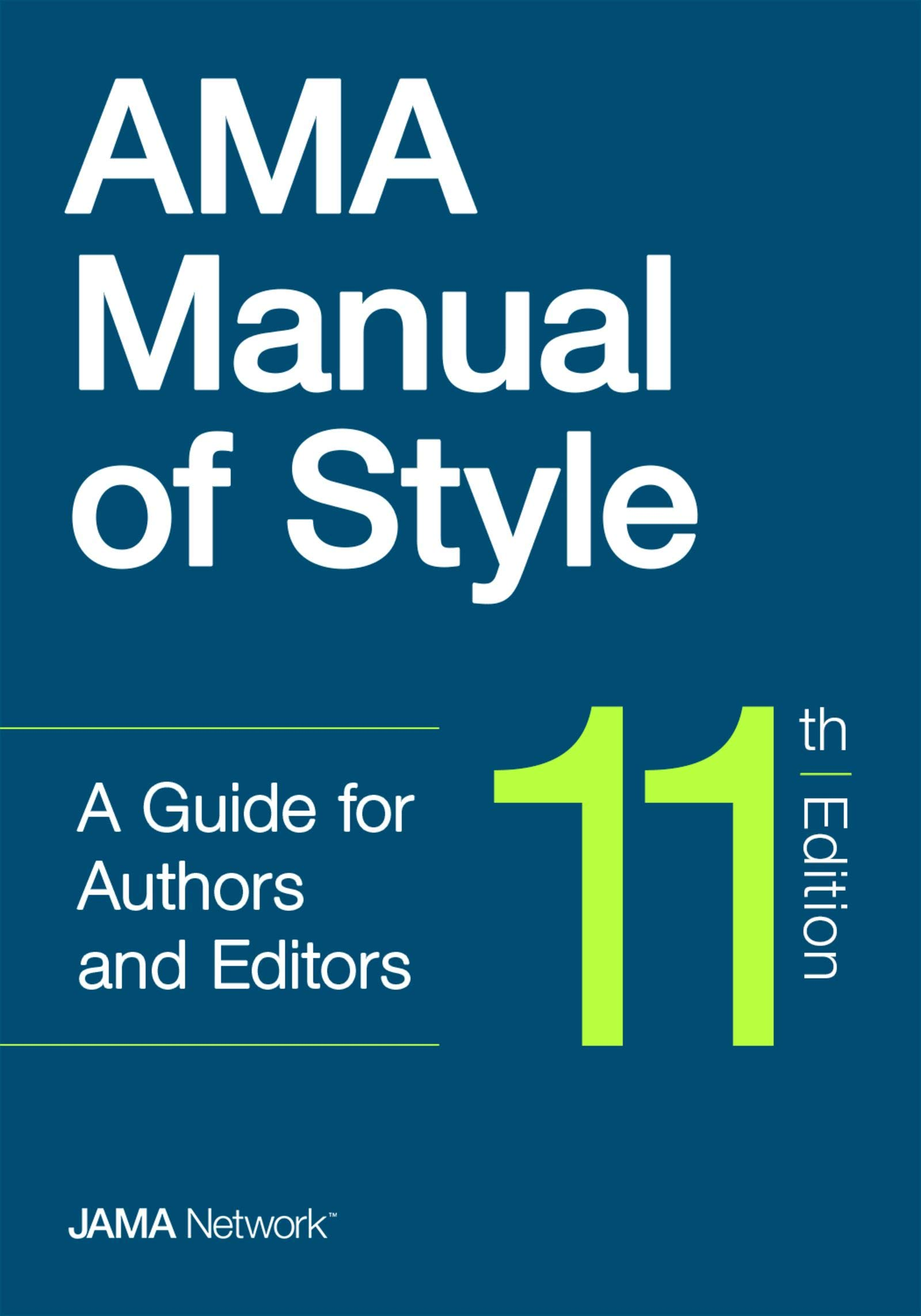
- Cover of the 11th edition (2020)
- Language: English
- Genre: Style guide
- Publisher: University of Oxford Press
- Publication date: 1962–2020
- Publication place: United States
- Media type: Print
- Pages: 1,256 (11th edition)
- ISBN: 978-0-19-024655-6
- LC Class: R119 .A533 2020
- Website: https://amamanualofstyle.com

AMA Manual of Style: A Guide for Authors and Editors is the style guide of the American Medical Association. It is written by the editors of JAMA (Journal of the American Medical Association) and the JAMA Network journals and is most recently published by Oxford University Press. It specifies the writing, editing, and citation styles for use in the journals published by the American Medical Association.

The manual was first published in 1962, and its current edition, the 11th, was released in 2020. It covers a range of topics for authors and editors in medicine and related health fields. The online edition also has regular updates. Style points that have changed since the last edition or new guidance such as how to present new terms like COVID-19 and SARS-CoV-2 or address race and ethnicity in science publication.

AMA style is widely used, either entirely or with modifications, by many other scientific journals (including medical, nursing, and other healthcare journals), in many textbooks, and in academia (for papers written in classes). Along with APA style and CSE style, it is one of the major style regimes for such work. Many publications have small local style guides that cascade over AMA, APA, or CSE style.

== Content areas ==
1. Types of Articles
2. Manuscript Preparation for Submission and Publication
3. References
4. Tables, Figures, and Multimedia
5. Ethical and Legal Considerations
6. Editorial Assessment and Processing
7. Grammar
8. Punctuation
9. Plurals
10. Capitalization
11. Correct and Preferred Usage
12. Non-English words, Phrases, and Accent Marks
13. Abbreviations
14. Nomenclature
15. Eponyms
16. Greek Letters
17. Units of Measure
18. Numbers and Percentages
19. Study Design and Statistics
20. Mathematical Composition
21. Editing, Proofreading, Tagging, and Display
22. Publishing Terms
23. Resources
