= Revista Médica de Chile =

- Discipline: Medicine
- Language: English, Spanish
- Edited by: Luis Michea

Publication details
- History: 1872–present
- Publisher: Sociedad Médica de Santiago (Chile)

Standard abbreviations
- ISO 4: Rev. Méd. Chile
- NLM: Rev Med Chil

Indexing
- ISSN: 0034-9887 (print); 0717-6163 (web)

Links
- Journal homepage

Revista Médica de Chile is a peer-reviewed scientific journal covering aspects of internal medicine. It is published by the Sociedad Médica de Santiago and the editor-in-chief is Dr. Luis Michea. The journal was established in 1872.

== Abstracting and indexing ==
The journal is abstracted and indexed in Index Medicus, SciELO, Chemical Abstracts and Social Sciences Citation Index.
