= APA style =

Academic style and writing format

Publication Manual of the American Psychological Association, Seventh Edition

APA style (also known as APA format) is a writing style and format for academic documents such as scholarly journal articles and books. It is commonly used for citing sources within the field of behavioral and social sciences, including sociology, education, nursing, criminal justice, anthropology, and psychology. It is described in the style guide of the American Psychological Association (APA), titled the Publication Manual of the American Psychological Association. The guidelines were developed to aid reading comprehension in the social and behavioral sciences, for clarity of communication, and for "word choice that best reduces bias in language". APA style is widely used, either entirely or with modifications, by hundreds of other scientific journals, in many textbooks, and in academia (for papers written in classes). The current edition is its seventh revision.

The APA became involved in journal publishing in 1923. In 1929, an APA committee had a seven-page writer's guide published in the Psychological Bulletin. In 1944, a 32-page guide appeared as an article in the same journal. The first edition of the APA Publication Manual was published in 1952 as a 61-page supplement to the Psychological Bulletin, marking the beginning of a recognized "APA style". The initial edition went through two revisions: one in 1957, and one in 1967. Subsequent editions were released in 1974, 1983, 1994, 2001, 2009, and 2019. The increasing length of the guidelines and its transformation into a manual have been accompanied by increasingly explicit prescriptions about many aspects of acceptable work. The earliest editions were controlled by a group of field leaders who were behaviorist in orientation and the manual has continued to foster that ideology, even as it has influenced many other fields.

According to the American Psychological Association, APA format can make the point of an argument clear and simple to the reader. Particularly influential were the "Guidelines for Nonsexist Language in APA Journals", first published as a modification to the 1974 edition, which provided practical alternatives to sexist language then in common usage. The guidelines for reducing bias in language have been updated over the years and presently provide practical guidance for writing about age, disability, gender, participation in research, race and ethnicity, sexual orientation, socioeconomic status, and intersectionality (APA, 2020, Chapter 5).

== Seventh edition of the Publication Manual ==
The seventh edition of the Publication Manual of the American Psychological Association is the current one, published in October 2019. The goal of the book is to help people become better writers and communicators by promoting clarity, precision, and inclusivity.

The manual has new resources for students, including a student title page, student paper formats, and student-related reference formats such as classroom course pack material and classroom website sources. The book also includes new journal article reporting standards for qualitative and mixed methods research in addition to updated standards for quantitative research. The bias-free language guidelines have also been updated to reflect current best practices for talking about people's personal characteristics.

The manual addresses accessibility for people with disabilities for the first time. APA worked with accessibility experts to ensure APA style is accessible. For example, the in-text citation format is shortened so that the citations are easier to read for people who, for example, use screen readers or have cognitive disabilities.

Running heads are used in papers that follow APA Style. The running head is an abbreviated version of the paper title that is included in the header of professional papers along with the page number. In student papers, the page number is placed in the header but the page title is not, unless otherwise stated by the course instructor or educational institution.

The manual has hundreds of reference examples, including formats for audiovisual media, social media, and webpages. There are many sample tables and figures, including basic student-friendly examples such as bar graphs. There are also sample papers for professionals and students.

Since the seventh edition, APA also provides an APA Style website and APA Style blog to help people with APA style and answer common questions.

== Sixth edition of the Publication Manual ==
The sixth edition of the Publication Manual of the American Psychological Association was in effect from 2009 to 2019, after four years of development. The Publication Manual Revision Task Force of the American Psychological Association established parameters for the revision based on published critique; user comments; commissioned reviews; and input from psychologists, nurses, librarians, business leaders, publishing professionals, and APA governance groups. To accomplish these revisions, the Task Force appointed working groups of four to nine members in seven areas: bias-free language, ethics, graphics, Journal Article Reporting Standards, references, statistics, and writing style (APA, 2009, pp. xvii–xviii).

The APA explained the issuing of a new edition only eight years after the fifth edition by pointing to the increased use of online source or online access to academic journals (6th edition, p. XV). The sixth edition is accompanied by a style website as well as the APA Style Blog which answers many common questions from users.

=== Errors in the first printing of the 6th edition ===
Sample papers in the first printing of the sixth edition contained errors. APA staff posted all of the corrections online for free in a single document on October 1, 2009, and shortly thereafter alerted users to the existence of the corrections in an APA blog entry. These errors attracted significant attention from the scholarly community and nearly two weeks later, on October 13, 2009, the article "Correcting a Style Guide" was published in the online newspaper Inside Higher Ed that included interviews with several individuals, one of whom described the errors as "egregious". All copies of the printing with errors were soon after recalled in 2009 (including those from major retailers such as Amazon.com) and a new printing correcting all the errors, with a copyright date of 2010, was issued.

== See also ==
- Citation
- Comparison of reference management software
- MLA style
- Chicago style

== Bibliography ==
- Publication Manual of the American Psychological Association (7th ed.). Washington, DC: American Psychological Association. 2020. ISBN 978-1-4338-3217-8. (spiral bound)
- Publication Manual of the American Psychological Association (6th ed.). Washington, DC: American Psychological Association. 2010. ISBN 978-1-4338-0562-2. (spiral bound)
- Publication Manual of the American Psychological Association (5th ed.). Washington, DC: American Psychological Association. 2001. ISBN 978-1-55798-791-4.
