= MLA Handbook =

Academic style guide

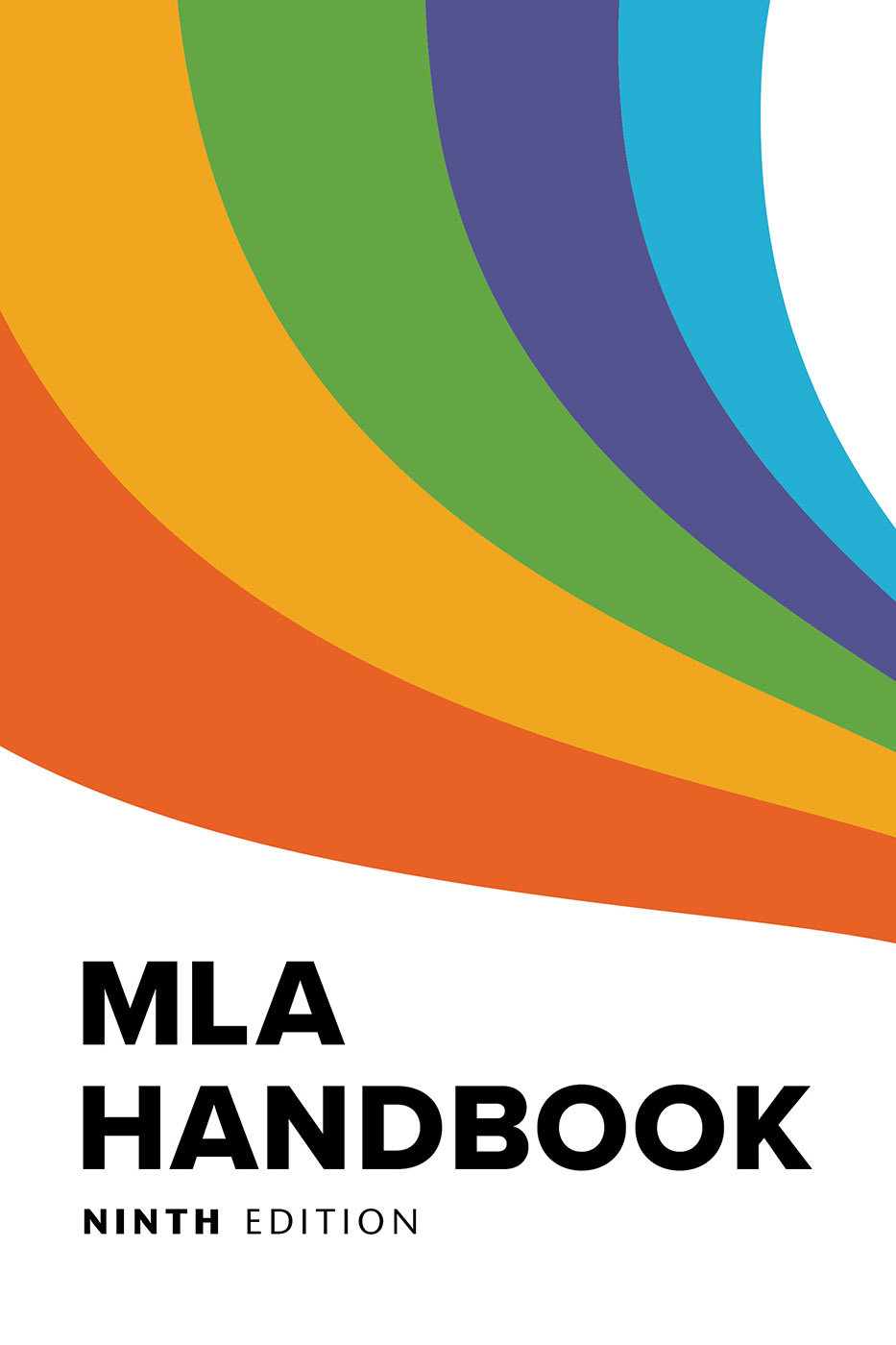
- MLA Handbook, 9th ed.
- Original title: MLA Handbook for Writers of Research Papers
- Language: English
- Subject: Style guide
- Publisher: Modern Language Association of America
- Publication date: 2021
- Publication place: United States
- Pages: xxx + 367
- ISBN: 9781603293518
- LC Class: LB2369 .M52 2021
- Website: style.mla.org

MLA Handbook (9th ed., 2021), formerly MLA Handbook for Writers of Research Papers (1977–2009), establishes a system for documenting sources in scholarly writing. It is published by the Modern Language Association, which is based in the United States. According to the organization, their MLA style "has been widely adopted for classroom instruction and used worldwide by scholars, journal publishers, and academic and commercial presses".

MLA Handbook began as an abridged student version of MLA Style Manual. Both are academic style guides that have been widely used in the United States, Canada, and other countries, providing guidelines for writing and documentation of research in the humanities, such as English studies (including the English language, writing, and literature written in English); the study of other modern languages and literatures, including comparative literature; literary criticism; media studies; cultural studies; and related disciplines. Released in April 2016, the eighth edition of MLA Handbook (like its previous editions) is addressed primarily to secondary-school and undergraduate college and university teachers and students.

MLA announced in April 2016 that MLA Handbook would henceforth be "the authoritative source for MLA style", and that the 2008 third edition of MLA Style Manual would be the final edition of the larger work. The announcement also stated that the organization "is in the process of developing additional publications to address the professional needs of scholars."

== History ==
MLA Handbook grew out of the initial MLA Style Sheet of 1951 (revised in 1970), a 28-page "more or less official" standard. The first five editions, published between 1977 and 1999 were titled MLA Handbook for Writers of Research Papers, Theses, and Dissertations. The 2003 sixth edition changed the title to MLA Handbook for Writers of Research Papers.

The seventh edition's main changes from the sixth edition were "no longer recogniz[ing] a default medium and instead call[ing] for listing the medium of publication [whether Print or Web or CD] in every entry in the list of works cited", recommending against listing URLs, and preferring italics over underline. Additionally, the seventh edition included a website with the full text of the book. Later online additions allowed for citation of e-books and tweets.

The eighth edition's main changes from the seventh edition are "shift[ing] our focus from a prescriptive list of formats to an overarching purpose of source documentation". Released in spring 2016, it changes the structure of the works cited list, most directly by adding abbreviations for volumes and issues (vol. and no.), pages (p. or pp.), not abbreviating words like "editor" or "translator", using URLs in most instances (though preferring DOI, as in APA), and not favoring the medium of publication. The ninth edition, in 2021, provides more examples, advises more inclusive language, and advises that URLs are optional, with DOI and permalinks being preferred. The ninth edition also provides rules for annotated bibliographies.

=== Editions ===
The table below identifies the year of publication of each edition of MLA Handbook.

Edition	Year
1	1977
2	1984
3	1988
4	1995
5	1999
6	2003
7	2009
8	2015
9	2021

=== MLA Style Manual ===
MLA Style Manual and Guide to Scholarly Publishing
- Original title: MLA Style Manual and Guide to Scholarly Publishing
- Language: English
- Subject: Style guide
- Publisher: Modern Language Association of America
- Publication date: 2008
- Publication place: United States
- English publication date: May 2008
- Media type: Print; large print; also listed as available as audiobook
- Pages: xxiv & 336
- ISBN: 978-0-87352-297-7
- OCLC: 191090459
- Dewey Decimal: 808/.027 22
- LC Class: PN147 .G444 2008
- Preceded by: MLA Style Manual and Guide to Scholarly Publishing (2nd ed., by Joseph Gibaldi)

MLA Style Manual, formerly titled MLA Style Manual and Guide to Scholarly Publishing in its second (1998) and third edition (2008), was an academic style guide by the United States–based Modern Language Association of America (MLA) first published in 1985. MLA announced in April 2015 that the publication would be discontinued: the third edition would be the last and was to be "taken out of print". The announcement also said that what began as an abridged version for students, MLA Handbook, was to be after that point "the authoritative source for MLA style", and that the organization was "in the process of developing additional publications to address the professional needs of scholars".

==== Usage ====
MLA documentation style is used in scholarship throughout the humanities, especially in English studies, modern languages and literatures, comparative literature, literary criticism, media studies, cultural studies, and related disciplines.

MLA Style Manual was one of two books on MLA documentation style published by the MLA. While MLA Handbook is aimed at secondary and post-secondary students and their teachers, the intended audience of MLA Style Manual primarily consisted of graduate students, academic scholars, professors, professional writers, and editors.

==== History ====
Both MLA Handbook and MLA Style Manual were preceded by a slim booklet titled MLA Style Sheet, first published in 1951 and revised in 1970. The Style Sheet was allowed to go out of print after the commercial success of the Handbook, creating the need for the Manual as a companion to the Handbook.

MLA Style Manual was scheduled to go out of print in 2016. In April 2017, the organization said it would be "developing additional publications to address the professional needs of scholars".

== See also ==
- Comparison of reference management software
- Parenthetical referencing
- APA style

== Bibliography ==
- Achtert, Walter S.; Gibaldi, Joseph (1985), The MLA Style Manual, New York: MLA.
- Modern Language Association (2008), MLA Style Manual and Guide to Scholarly Publishing (3rd ed.), New York: MLA, ISBN 978-0-87352-297-7.
- Modern Language Association (2009), The MLA Handbook for Writers of Research Papers (7th ed.), New York: MLA, ISBN 978-1-60329-024-1.
- "What Is MLA Style?", Modern Language Association, 2011.
