= Concision =

Writing principle of using few words

In common usage and linguistics, concision (also called conciseness, succinctness, terseness, brevity, or laconicism) is a communication principle of eliminating redundancy, generally achieved by using as few words as possible in a sentence while preserving its meaning. More generally, it is achieved through the omission of parts that impart information that was already given, that is obvious or that is irrelevant. Outside of linguistics, a message may be similarly "dense" in other forms of communication.

For example, a sentence of "It is a fact that most arguments must try to convince readers, that is the audience, that the arguments are true." may be expressed more concisely as "Most arguments must demonstrate their truth to readers." – the observations that the statement is a fact and that readers are its audience are redundant, and it is unnecessary to repeat the word "arguments" in the sentence.

"Laconic" speech or writing refers to the pithy bluntness that the Laconian people of ancient Greece were reputedly known for.

In linguistic research, there have been approaches to analyze the level of succinctness of texts using semantic analysis.

== Statements of the principle ==
Polymath Blaise Pascal wrote in a 1657 letter:

Je n’ai fait celle-ci plus longue que parce que je n’ai pas eu le loisir de la faire plus courte.

Translation:

I have made this longer than usual, only because I have not had the time to make it shorter.

Mark Twain, in a criticism of James Fenimore Cooper, stated, "Eschew surplusage."

William Strunk and E. B. White's The Elements of Style, an American English style guide, advises:

Omit needless words. Vigorous writing is concise. A sentence should contain no unnecessary words, a paragraph no unnecessary sentences, for the same reason that a drawing should have no unnecessary lines and a machine no unnecessary parts. This requires not that the writer make all his sentences short, or that he avoid all detail and treat his subjects only in outline, but that every word tell.

Joseph M. Williams's Style: Lessons in Clarity and Grace suggests six principles for concision:

1. Delete words that mean little or nothing.
2. Delete words that repeat the meaning of other words.
3. Delete words implied by other words.
4. Replace a phrase with a word.
5. Change negatives to affirmatives.
6. Delete useless adjectives and adverbs.

Concision is taught to students at all levels. It is valued highly in expository English writing, but less by some other cultures.

== Importance in pedagogy ==
In an influential study by educational psychologist Richard E. Mayer and others, succinctness of textbook and lecture content was linked to better understanding of the material.

== In computing ==
In computing, succinct data structures balance minimal storage use against efficiency of access. In algorithmic game theory, a succinct game is one that may be accurately described in a simpler form than its normal representation.

== See also ==
- Brevitas – Rhetorical style using a minimum of essential words
- Business communication – Process of sharing information between employees within and outside a company
- Circumstantial speech – Seemingly tangential discussion that returns to the point
- Evidence-based education – Paradigm of the education field
- Frame semantics (linguistics) – Linguistic theory
- Information density – Communication and graphic design
- Information structure – Way in which information is formally packaged within a sentence
- Information theory – Scientific study of digital information
- Lexical density – Complexity of communication
- Memorization – Cognitive process
- Minimalism – Movement in various forms of art and design
- Pleonasm – Redundancy in linguistic expression
