= The Craft of Research =

Book by Wayne C. Booth et al.

- First edition
- Authors: Wayne C. Booth, Gregory G. Colomb, Joseph M. Williams, Joseph Bizup, and William T. Fitzgerald
- Language: English
- Subject: research methods
- Publisher: University of Chicago Press
- Publication date: 1995 (2nd ed. 2003, 3rd ed. 2008, 4th ed. 2016, 5th ed. 2024)
- Publication place: United States
- Media type: Print
- Pages: 368
- ISBN: 978-0226826677
- OCLC: 1411307366

The Craft of Research is a book by Wayne C. Booth, Gregory G. Colomb, Joseph M. Williams, Joseph Bizup, and William T. Fitzgerald. (Note: Joseph Bizup and William T. Fitzgerald became contributing authors with the fourth edition.) The work is published by the University of Chicago Press. The book aims to provide a basic overview of how to research, from the process of selecting a topic and gathering sources to the process of writing results. The book has become a standard text in college composition classes and is now in its fifth edition.

The first edition of The Craft of Research was a winner of the 1995–1996 Critics' Choice Award. Material from The Craft of Research has also been adapted to form the first part of Kate L. Turabian's A Manual for Writers of Research Papers, Theses, and Dissertations.

== Structure ==
Below is the structure of the work, as outlined in the fourth edition.

=== Part 1: Research, Researchers, and Readers ===
- Thinking in Print: The Uses of Research, Public and Private
- Connecting with Your Reader: Creating a Role for Yourself and Your Readers

=== Part 2: Asking Questions, Finding Answers ===
- From Topics to Questions
- From Questions to Problems
- From Problems to Sources
- Engaging Sources

=== Part 3: Making an Argument ===
- Making Good Arguments: An Overview
- Making Claims
- Assembling Reasons and Evidence
- Acknowledgments and Responses
- Warrants

=== Part 4: Writing Your Argument ===
- Planning and Drafting
- Organizing Your Argument
- Incorporating Sources
- Communicating Evidence Visually
- Introductions and Conclusions
- Revising Style: Telling Your Story Clearly

=== Part 5: Some Last Considerations ===
- The Ethics of Research
- A Postscript for Teachers
- Appendix: Bibliographical Resources

== Editions ==
Editions of The Craft of Research
Edition	Year	ISBN	In Print?
First	1995	ISBN 978-0226065847	No
Second	2003	ISBN 978-0226065670	No
Third	2008	ISBN 978-0226065656 (Cloth) ISBN 978-0226065663 (Paperback)	Yes
Fourth	2016	ISBN 978-0226239736	Yes
Fifth	2024	ISBN 9780226826677	Yes

== Translations ==
- Swedish: Forskning och skrivande: konsten att skriva enkelt och effektivt, ISBN 978-9144129327 (from 4th ed. 2019)
- Japanese: Risachi no giho, ISBN 978-4802611527 (from 4th ed. 2018)
- Korean: Haksul nonmun chaksongbop, ISBN 978-8993712889 (from 4th ed. 2017)
- Chinese: Yan jiu shi yi men yi shu, ISBN 978-7501189045 (from 2nd ed. 2009)
- Portuguese: A arte da pesquisa, ISBN 978-8533621572 (from 2nd ed. 2008)
- Spanish: Cómo convertirse en un hábil investigador, ISBN 978-8474328172 (from 1st ed. 2001)

== See also ==
- Research design
- Research question
