= Brevity =

Brevity is concision or brevitas, the quality of being brief or concise, or:

- Brevity (comic strip), a comic strip created by Guy Endore-Kaiser and Rodd Perry
- Brevity code, a vocal word replacement system
- Operation Brevity, a World War II battle
