= A Manual for Writers of Research Papers, Theses, and Dissertations =

Style guide for writing

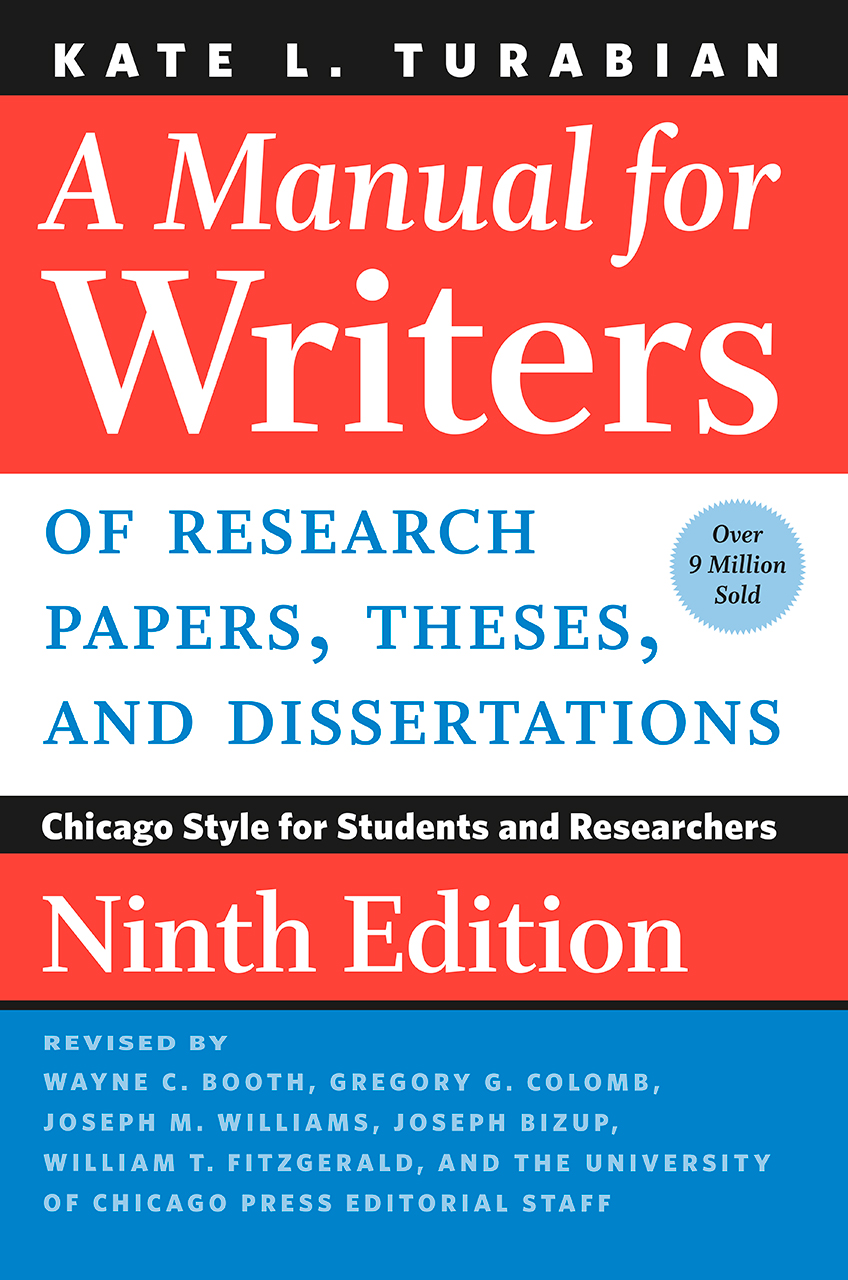
- Ninth edition book cover
- Editors: Wayne C. Booth, Gregory G. Colomb, Joseph M. Williams, Joseph Bizup, William T. Fitzgerald, and the University of Chicago Press Editorial Staff
- Author: Kate L. Turabian
- Language: English
- Subject: Style guide
- Publisher: University of Chicago Press
- Publication date: April 2018
- Publication place: United States
- Media type: Print
- Pages: 464
- ISBN: 978-0226430577

A Manual for Writers of Research Papers, Theses, and Dissertations is a style guide for writing and formatting research papers, theses, and dissertations and is published by the University of Chicago Press.

The work is often referred to as "Turabian" (after the work's original author, Kate L. Turabian) or by the shortened title A Manual for Writers. The style and formatting of academic works, described within the manual, is commonly referred to as "Turabian style" or "Chicago style" (being based on that of The Chicago Manual of Style).

The ninth edition of the manual, published in 2018, corresponds with the 17th edition of The Chicago Manual of Style.

== Structure and content of the manual ==
Except for a few minor differences, the style and formatting described in the ninth edition of the manual is the same as the 17th edition of The Chicago Manual of Style. While The Chicago Manual of Style focuses on providing guidelines for publishing, Turabian's A Manual for Writers of Research Papers, Theses, and Dissertations is intended for the creation and submission of academic works; where the two works differ "in small ways," Turabian's manual is designed to "better suit the requirements of academic papers as opposed to published works." As such, the manual describes itself as the "authoritative student resource on 'Chicago style'."

=== Part 1: Research and Writing ===
Part 1 of the manual approaches the process of research and writing. This includes providing "practical advice" to formulate "the right questions, read critically, and build arguments" as well as helping authors draft and revise a paper. Initially added with the seventh edition of the manual, this part is adapted from The Craft of Research.

=== Part 2: Source Citation ===
Part 2 of the manual explores the two methods of citing/documenting sources used in authoring a work: (1) the notes-bibliography style; and (2) the author-date style.

The notes-bibliography style (also known as the "notes and bibliography style" or "notes style") is "popular in the humanities—including literature, history, and the arts." This style has sources cited in "numbered footnotes or endnotes" with "each note correspond[ing] to a raised (superscript) number in the text." This style also uses a separate bibliography at the end of the document, listing each of the sources.

The more-concise author-date style (sometimes referred to as the "reference list style") is more common in the physical, natural, and social sciences. This style involves sources being "briefly cited in the text, usually in parentheses, by author’s last name and year of publication" with the parenthetical citations corresponding to "an entry in a reference list, where full bibliographic information is provided."

The manual provides extensive examples of how to cite different types of works (e.g. books, journal articles, websites, etc.) using both citation styles.

=== Part 3: Style ===
Part 3 of the manual "addresses matters of spelling, punctuation, abbreviation, and treatment of numbers, names, special terms, and titles of works." This part also provides guidance on including quotations from different sources as well as the formatting of tables and figures.

=== Appendix: Paper Format and Submission ===
The appendix provides specific requirements on the formatting of research papers as well as theses and dissertations. General formatting requirements include recommendations on paper and margin sizes, options as to the choice of typeface, the spacing and indentation of text, pagination, and the use of titles. Formatting requirements for specific elements include the ordering and formatting of content in the front matter, main matter (text), and back matter of a work. The appendix also includes a description on preparing and submitting files, both electronically and as hard copies.

On the formatting and style, however, the manual notes that it "may be supplemented—or even overruled—by the conventions of specific disciplines or the preferences of particular institutions, departments or instructors." More so, the manual consistently reminds students to "review the requirements of their university, department, or instructor, which take precedence over the guidelines presented [in the manual]."

== Editions ==
Editions of Kate L. Turabian's A Manual for Writers
Edition	Year	Editor(s)	Corresponding CMOS Edition
A Manual for Writers of Dissertations
First	1937 (unpublished)		Tenth
First	1949 (reprint)		Eleventh
A Manual for Writers of Term Papers, Theses, and Dissertations
Second	1955		Eleventh
Third	1967		Eleventh
Fourth	1973		Twelfth
Fifth	1987	Bonnie Birtwistle Honigsblum	Thirteenth
Sixth	1996	John Grossman and Alice Bennett	Fourteenth
A Manual for Writers of Research Papers, Theses, and Dissertations: Chicago Style for Students and Researchers
Seventh	2007	Wayne C. Booth, Gregory G. Colomb, Joseph M. Williams, and the University of Chicago Press Editorial Staff	Fifteenth
Eighth	2013	Wayne C. Booth, Gregory G. Colomb, Joseph M. Williams, and the University of Chicago Press Editorial Staff	Sixteenth
Ninth	2018	Wayne C. Booth, Gregory G. Colomb, Joseph M. Williams, Joseph Bizup, William T. FitzGerald, and the University of Chicago Press Editorial Staff	Seventeenth
