= Diana Hacker =

American writer and educator (1942–2004)

- Born: July 7, 1942; Washington, Illinois, US
- Died: January 12, 2004 (aged 61); Washington, D.C., US
- Education: University of Illinois
- Occupations: Author; educator
- Spouse: Robert Hacker
- Writing career
- Language: English
- Subject: Writing manuals
- Notable works: A Writer's Reference; A Pocket Style Manual; The Bedford Handbook

Diana Hacker (July 7, 1942 – January 12, 2004) was an American writer and educator who authored several prominent writing manuals. Her guide, A Writer's Reference, became the number one best-selling college textbook in the United States.

Raised in Washington, Illinois, Hacker was an English professor at Prince George's Community College (PGCC) for 35 years. Hacker is widely acknowledged for her contributions to the field of rhetoric and composition. She died of cancer in 2004.

== Biography ==
Hacker was raised in Washington, Illinois. Her father was a line worker for Caterpillar who managed to move his family "squarely into the middle class" after becoming a supervisor. Hacker obtained a master's degree in English composition from the University of Illinois.

Hacker moved to Washington, D.C. in 1967 after her husband, Robert Hacker, a lawyer, obtained a job with the Securities and Exchange Commission. She briefly taught at the University of Maryland before joining the faculty at Prince George's Community College (PGCC). Hacker remained an English professor at PGCC for 35 years until her retirement in 2000. She continued tutoring after her retirement at the school's Writing Center.

Hacker also chaired the nominating committee of the Conference on College Composition and Communication (CCCC) at regional and national meetings. Hacker died from cancer on January 12, 2004, at the George Washington University Hospital.

=== A Writer's Reference ===
Hacker pitched the idea of A Writer's Reference to Bedford/St. Martin's in 1987. The handbook was designed for ease of use, with an unprecedented "lie-flat" spiral binding and tabbed dividers. The handbook did not include worksheets or exercises and was intended to be used as a supplemental guide for students. The book offers correct citations and bibliographies for papers in MLA, CMS, or APA formats. According to Hacker, "It took me a while to convince Bedford of the value of my idea." Bedford president Chuck Christensen and co-publisher Joan Feinberg eventually bought the idea and the first edition of A Writer's Reference was published in 1989. A Writer's Reference sold nearly 3 million copies by 2004 and became a staple for college freshmen. It became the best-selling college textbook of any discipline. The book's success allowed Hacker to become a millionaire. Using some of the profits from her book sales, Hacker funded scholarships for students.

== Legacy ==
The Diana Hacker TYCA Outstanding Programs in English Award was formed in Hacker's honor and is sponsored by the National Council of Teachers of English along with Bedford/St. Martin's. The award is given out annually to two-year college teachers and their institutions for "exemplary programs in English studies and its related disciplines."

Hacker is widely acknowledged for her contributions to the field of rhetoric and composition. A previous version of the Open Syllabus Project placed Hacker's guides, A Writer's Reference and A Pocket Style Manual as the number one and number third assigned texts at American colleges, respectively and placed Hacker as the second most read female author on college campuses after Kate L. Turabian. The newest version of the Open Syllabus Project places A Writer's Reference as the second most assigned text and Hacker as the most assigned female author (fifth overall). In total, Hacker's works appear on more than 25,500 syllabi, ahead of Aristotle.

A syllabus obtained by Politico revealed that First Lady Jill Biden, a professor of English at Northern Virginia Community College, assigned Hacker and Sommer's Rules for Writers alongside comedian Trevor Noah's autobiography, Born a Crime, for her introductory English course. Rules for Writers is also given to prisoners participating in the Bard Prison Initiative.

Hacker left notes for revisions to her handbooks, which also include The Bedford Handbook, to be made to the next editions. After her death, Nancy Sommers became the co-author.
