= Nevile Gwynne =

British writer

Nevile Martin Gwynne is a British writer who has gained recognition and some criticism for his book Gwynne's Grammar. He has also written Gwynne's Latin. In April 2013 a grammar test devised by Gwynne was published by The Daily Telegraph. He spent his early days in Gloucestershire before attending Eton College and Oxford University, graduating with a degree in Modern languages. He later qualified as a Chartered Accountant at the British Institute of Chartered Accountants.

== Gwynne's Grammar ==
Gwynne's Grammar is an "introduction to Grammar and the writing of good English".

Part One

In "Part One" of Gwynne's Grammar, Gwynne explains that "all thinking and communicating depend on grammar". In Chapter 5, "Parts of Speech", he criticises both H. W. Fowler and Eric Partridge for their treatment of the word "firstly"– Fowler for his support of the word and Partridge for his rejection of it. His objection is that both Fowler and Partridge fail to produce any authoritative support for their opinions. Gwynne then goes on to support the use of the construction "First, secondly" (in preference to "Firstly, secondly"), using Michael Dummett's Grammar & Style For Examination Candidates and Others as a supporting source. Continuing in the same vein he outlines his opposition to modern usage of the words "hopefully", "regretfully" and "thankfully". The remainder of "Part One" is a discourse on parts of speech, syntax and punctuation.

Part Two

"Part Two" is a reproduction of an earlier work: The Elements of Style, by Professor William Strunk.

Part Three

"Part Three" comprises a number of appendices including a brief coverage of grammatical definitions, irregular verbs, "Special Prepositions" and "The Formation of Plurals".

=== Reception ===
Gwynne's Grammar has received mixed reviews:

- The book gained approval from Education Secretary Michael Gove who "told his department to stop writing pompous, illiterate letters".
- According to Michael Rosen "Martin Gwynne may have fun telling people the rules of grammar, but language is owned and controlled by everybody".
- Linguist Geoffrey Pullum called Gwynne a "preposterous old fraud" with a "lack of any grasp of the subject" and was quoted in the New Zealand Herald saying, "I've never seen a book so bad on my subject".
- Oliver Kamm, a leader writer for The Times newspaper, in Accidence Will Happen: The Non-Pedantic Guide to English Usage, described Gwynne’s Grammar as "a work of titanic silliness" and in The Times in January 2017 as "the worst book I have read on language and perhaps on anything".

== Gwynne's Latin ==
Gwynne's Latin is an "introduction to Latin including the Latin in everyday English". According to Britt Peterson of The Boston Globe, Gwynne believes "students should start memorising Latin verbs at age 3".

Part One

In Chapter 1, "About Latin", Gwynne explains his love of the subject in some detail and in Chapter 3, "The Importance of Learning Latin, Examined in Detail", describes how Jean Paul Getty employed classicists because "They sell more oil". In Chapter 4, "Is This How to Learn Latin?", he criticises both the Cambridge Latin Course and the Oxford Latin Course for being "impossible to learn Latin from".

Part Two Chapter 6 defines accidence (morphology), parts of speech, syntax and grammatical cases and in Chapter 8, pronunciation is covered.

Part Three

"Part Three" contains the main subject matter including declensions. Everything that is covered in "Part Two" is discussed in more detail.

=== Reception ===
Gwynne's Latin has received less recognition than has Gwynne's Grammar.

- Harry Mount, in The Spectator writes; "It would be a precocious child who had the determination to teach himself Latin, but he certainly could from this book. As Molesworth says, he’d have to work hard, and, as Gwynne says, he’d have to do a lot of learning by heart."
- Daniel Hahn wrote; "This little book makes a great case for learning Latin, not least because of the countless Latin words and phrases in our daily English."
- Ross McGuinness in the Metro took a neutral line, supporting the teaching of Latin without expressing an opinion of the merits of Gwynne's book.

== Gwynne's Kings and Queens of England ==
Gwynne's Kings and Queens of England was published by Ebury Press on 10 May 2018.

== Gwynne's Evolution or Creation? ==
Gwynne's Evolution or Creation? - An All Important Subject Investigated was published by St Edward's Press in September 2020.

== Gwynne's William Shakespeare ==
Gwynne's William Shakespeare: At Long Last The Reality - The Demonstrable Reality was published by St Edward's Press in 2021.

== Gwynne's Introduction To TRUE Philosophy ==
Gwynne's Introduction To TRUE Philosophy was published by St Edward's Press in 2022.

== Gwynne on the Writing of Verse and Poetry ==
Gwynne on the Writing of Verse and Poetry was published by St Edward's Press in 2023.

== Sources ==
- Gwynne's Grammar (2013), Ebury Press, ISBN 9780091951450
- Gwynne's Latin (2014), Ebury Press, ISBN 9780091957438
