= Gregory G. Colomb =

- Born: September 5, 1951; New Orleans, Louisiana
- Died: October 11, 2011 (aged 60); Charlottesville, Virginia

Academic background
- Education: Rice University (BA); University of Virginia (MA, PhD)

Gregory G. Colomb (September 5, 1951 – October 11, 2011) was a professor of the English language and literature and director of writing programs at the University of Virginia. His research interests were in writing studies, 18th century literature, and theory.

He was born in New Orleans, Louisiana. He studied at Rice University and the University of Virginia. He taught English and writing at the University of Chicago, the Georgia Institute of Technology, and the University of Illinois at Urbana-Champaign before moving back to the University of Virginia.

Together with Joseph M. Williams, Francis X. Kinahan, George D. Gopen, and Lawrence D. McEnerney, he developed instructional materials for writers in the academy and the professions known as The Little Red Schoolhouse. Colomb died on October 11, 2011, in Charlottesville, Virginia.

== Works ==
- Style: Toward Clarity and Grace. Chicago: University of Chicago Press (1990, 1995) by Joseph M. Williams, two chapters coauthored
- Designs on Truth: A Poetics of the Augustan Mock-Epic. University Park, PA: Penn State University Press (1992)
- The Craft of Research. Chicago: University of Chicago Press (1995, 2003, 2008) with Wayne C. Booth and Joseph M. Williams
- The Craft of Argument. New York: Longman (2002, 2004, 2006) with Joseph M. Williams
- A Manual for Writers of Research Papers, Theses, and Dissertations, Seventh Edition: Chicago Style for Students and Researchers. Chicago: University of Chicago Press (2007) by Kate L. Turabian, revised together with Wayne C. Booth, Joseph M. Williams, and The University of Chicago Press Editorial Staff
- Style: Lessons in Clarity and Grace (2011) with Joseph M. Williams

== Personal life ==
Colomb was married to Sandra S. Colomb, and they had three daughters: Robin, Karen, and Lauren.
