= The Bedford Handbook =

English grammar and composition textbook

- The Bedford Handbook, Seventh Edition
- Author: Diana Hacker
- Language: English
- Genre: Nonfiction
- Publisher: Bedford/St. Martin's
- Publication date: 2009 (8 ed.)
- Publication place: United States
- Media type: Paperback and Hardcover
- ISBN: 0-312-65269-0
- OCLC: 62584120
- Dewey Decimal: 808/.042 22
- LC Class: PE1408 .H277 2006

The Bedford Handbook is a guide written by Diana Hacker, now in its twelfth edition, that provides basic explanations of proper English grammar, composition, citation, and textual analysis. The guide includes a number of sample texts (including essays) and illustrations throughout its sections. It also covers the concept of plagiarism.

The Bedford Handbook contains guides to the MLA, APA, and Chicago citation styles and includes examples of each style in essay form. The book is paired with a companion website that has exercises and more writing models. The hardback is 820 pages and the paperback is 960 pages and are published by United States publisher Bedford/St. Martin's.
