= Joseph M. Williams =

American academic (1933–2008)

Joseph M. Williams (18 August 1933 in Cleveland, Ohio – 22 February 2008 in South Haven, Michigan) was a professor in the Department of English Language and Literature at the University of Chicago where he promoted clarity in writing for many years. He authored several books on language and writing.

== Biography ==
Williams began as a researcher of English language. In Origins of the English Language: A Social & Linguistic History, he traces the history of the English language from the evolution of man through to Modern English. His interest in studying the close connection between grammar and rhetoric was reflected in another earlier book The New English: Structure, Form, Style and culminated in Style: Lessons in Clarity and Grace, his noteworthy textbook on writing style.

In Style, based on the "Little Red Schoolhouse" course he taught at Chicago for many years, Williams established and vehemently defended two basic principles that "it is good to write clearly, and anyone can" (Style: Lessons in Clarity and Grace (9th Edition) 4). To meet these ends, Williams laid out streamlined steps to help writers first make their sentences and paragraphs clear and then graceful. At the story level, writers can make sentences clearer by identifying the main character for the "story" (movable element) in the grammatical subject (fixed position) and expressing actions in grammatical verbs. At the information level, sentences are easier to understand when the beginning connects to the old information of prior sentences and the end presents new information. Paragraphs are cohesive when sentences have a sense of flow, and coherent when paragraphs are felt as the whole. Beyond clarity, graceful sentences and paragraphs are concise, shapely (uninterrupted and coordinated), and elegant (balanced in syntax, meaning, sound and rhythm). In later editions, he discussed ethics of writing understood as a social act between writer and reader and offered steps to produce coherent documents.

Noting the kinship between Style and The Elements of Style by William Strunk and E.B. White, Berkeley professor J. Bradford DeLong praised Williams for the practicality of his advice.

The Craft of Research, a collaborative textbook written by Williams and his two long-term academic colleagues and friends – Wayne C. Booth and Gregory G. Colomb, – was designed to help students plan, carry out and report on research in any field and at any level – from a term paper to a dissertation, an article, and a book. Authors understood writing a research report as "thinking in writing" and "thinking from the point of view of [the] readers" (The Craft of Research 15). Their treatment of research arguments included a refinement of Stephen Toulmin's formal layout of arguments. In another book, The Craft of Argument, Williams and Colomb looked at written arguments in general. The authors claimed that in argument "questions and answers not only seek truth, but also generate the means of persuasion that rhetoric seeks" (The Craft of Argument xix).

Together with Gregory G. Colomb, Francis X. Kinahan, and Lawrence McEnerney, Williams developed innovative instructional materials for advanced writers in the academy and the professions known as the "Little Red Schoolhouse".

From 1980, Williams (together with Colomb and others) ran Clearlines, a consulting firm helping writers in corporations, law firms, and consulting groups to write clearly and concisely.

== Books ==
- The New English: Structure, Form, Style. New York: Free Press (1975)
- Origins of the English Language: A Social and Linguistic History. New York: Free Press (1975, 1986)
- Style: Lessons in Clarity and Grace. Glenview, Ill.: Scott, Foresman (1981, 1985, 1989), New York: HarperCollins (1989, 1994), New York: Longman (1997, 2000, 2003), Toronto: Longman (2005), New York: Pearson Longman (2005, 2007)
- Style: Toward Clarity and Grace. Chicago: University of Chicago Press (1990, 1995) with two chapters coauthored by Gregory G. Colomb
- The Craft of Research. Chicago: University of Chicago Press (1995, 2003) with Wayne C. Booth and Gregory G. Colomb
- The Craft of Argument. New York: Longman (2001, 2003, 2007) with Gregory G. Colomb
- Style: The Basics of Clarity and Grace. New York: Pearson Longman (2003, 2006)
- A Manual for Writers of Research Papers, Theses, and Dissertations, Seventh Edition: Chicago Style for Students and Researchers. Chicago: University of Chicago Press (2007) by Kate L. Turabian, revised together with Wayne C. Booth, Gregory G. Colomb, and The University of Chicago Press Editorial Staff
