= The Elements of Style =

American English writing style guide

- First expanded edition (1959)
- Author: William Strunk Jr. (1918/1920); and E. B. White (1959)
- Illustrator: Maira Kalman (2005 only)
- Subject: American English style guide
- Publisher: Harcourt, Brace & Howe (1920); Macmillan (1959); Allyn & Bacon (1999)
- Publication place: United States
- Media type: Print (paperback)
- Pages: 43 (1918), 52 (1920), 71 (1959), 105 (1999)
- OCLC: 27652766
- Dewey Decimal: 808/.042 21
- LC Class: PE1421 .S7 (Strunk); PE1408 .S772 (Strunk & White)

The Elements of Style is a writing style guide for American English, comprising eight "elementary rules of usage," ten "elementary principles of composition", "a few matters of form", a list of 49 "words and expressions commonly misused", and a list of 57 "words often misspelled". William Strunk Jr. wrote the first edition, published by Harcourt in 1920. Thirty-five years later, the writer and editor E. B. White revised and expanded the guide for publication by Macmillan Publishers in 1959, widely cited as Strunk & White.

Time magazine recognized the expanded edition as one of the hundred best and most influential nonfiction books in English since 1923.

== History ==
At Cornell University, the professor of English studies William Strunk Jr. wrote The Elements of Style in 1918 and privately published it in 1919, for use in his classes of English. Later, Strunk and editor Edward A. Tenney revised The Elements of Style for publication as The Elements and Practice of Composition (1935). In 1957, the style guide reached the attention of E.B. White at The New Yorker magazine. White had studied writing under Strunk in 1919, but had forgotten about "the little book", which he described as a "forty-three-page summation of the case for cleanliness, accuracy, and brevity in the use of English." Weeks later, White wrote about Strunk's devotion to lucid English prose in his column Letter from the East.

In 1957, Macmillan and Company commissioned White to revise Strunk's writing manual for a new edition. White's expansion and modernization of The Elements and Practice of Composition, by Strunk and Tenney in 1935, yielded the writing style manual broadly known as "Strunk & White", which sold approximately two million copies in 1959.

Maira Kalman, who provided the illustrations for The Elements of Style Illustrated (2005, see below), asked Nico Muhly to compose a cantata based on the book. It was performed at the New York Public Library in October 2005.Audiobook versions of The Elements now feature changed wording, citing "gender issues" with the original.

Mark Garvey details the book's history in Stylized: A Slightly Obsessive History of Strunk & White's The Elements of Style (2009).

== Content ==
As a professor of English studies, Strunk concentrated upon the cultivation of good writing and composition; in the original edition of 1918 he exhorted writers to "omit needless words," use the active voice, and employ parallelism appropriately.

The 1959 edition features White's expansions of the preliminary sections, the "Introduction" essay derived from his magazine story about Strunk, and the concluding chapter, "An Approach to Style," which presents a broader, prescriptive guide to writing in English. White also produced the second (1972) and third (1979) editions of The Elements of Style, by which time the book's length had extended to 85 pages.

The third edition of The Elements of Style (1979) features 54 points: a list of common word-usage errors; 11 rules of punctuation and grammar; 11 principles of writing; 11 matters of form; and, in Chapter V, 21 reminders for better style. The final reminder, the 21st, "Prefer the standard to the offbeat," is thematically integral to the subject of The Elements of Style, yet it does stand as a discrete essay about writing lucid prose. To write well, White advises writers to have the proper mindset, that they write to please themselves, and that they aim for "one moment of felicity," a phrase by Robert Louis Stevenson. Thus Strunk's 1918 recommendation:

Vigorous writing is concise. A sentence should contain no unnecessary words, a paragraph no unnecessary sentences, for the same reason that a drawing should have no unnecessary lines and a machine no unnecessary parts. This requires not that the writer make all his sentences short, or that he avoid all detail and treat his subjects only in outline, but that he make every word tell.

— "Elementary Principles of Composition", The Elements of Style

Strunk Jr. no longer has a comma in his name in the 1979 and later editions, due to the modernized style recommendation about punctuating such names.

The fourth edition of The Elements of Style (1999) omits Strunk's advice about masculine pronouns: "unless the antecedent is or must be feminine". In its place, the book reads, "many writers find the use of the generic he or his to rename indefinite antecedents limiting or offensive." The re-titled entry "They. He or She", in Chapter IV: Misused Words and Expressions, advises the writer to avoid an "unintentional emphasis on the masculine".

Components new to the fourth edition include a foreword by essayist and E. B. White stepson Roger Angell, a glossary, and an index. Five years later, the fourth edition text was re-published as The Elements of Style Illustrated (2005), with illustrations by the designer Maira Kalman.

== Reception ==
=== Praise ===
Reviewing the expanded edition of Strunk & White, writer Dorothy Parker suggested:

If you have any young friends who aspire to become writers, the second-greatest favor you can do them is to present them with copies of The Elements of Style. The first-greatest, of course, is to shoot them now, while they're happy.

Stephen King reflects in On Writing (2000, p. 11): "There is little or no detectable bullshit in that book. (Of course, it's short; at eighty-five pages it's much shorter than this one.) I'll tell you right now that every aspiring writer should read The Elements of Style. Rule 17 in the chapter titled Principles of Composition is 'Omit needless words.' I will try to do that here."

In its 2011 list, Time selected The Elements of Style among the 100 best and most influential nonfiction books written in English since 1923. Upon its release, Charles Poor, writing for The New York Times, called it "a splendid trophy for all who are interested in reading and writing."

In 2011, University of Vienna professor in biochemistry Tim Skern argued in Writing Scientific English: A Workbook that The Elements of Style "remains the best book available on writing good English".

In 2013, Nevile Gwynne reproduced The Elements of Style in his work Gwynne's Grammar. Britt Peterson of The Boston Globe wrote that his inclusion of the book was a "curious addition".

In 2016, the Open Syllabus Project lists The Elements of Style as the most frequently assigned text in US academic syllabuses, based on an analysis of 933,635 texts appearing in over 1 million syllabuses.

=== Critiques ===
Criticism of Strunk & White has largely focused on claims that it has a prescriptivist nature, or that it has become a general anachronism in the face of modern English usage. In criticizing The Elements of Style, Geoffrey Pullum, professor of linguistics at the University of Edinburgh, and co-author of The Cambridge Grammar of the English Language (2002), said that:

The book's toxic mix of purism, atavism, and personal eccentricity is not underpinned by a proper grounding in English grammar. It is often so misguided that the authors appear not to notice their own egregious flouting of its own rules ... It's sad. Several generations of college students learned their grammar from the uninformed bossiness of Strunk and White, and the result is a nation of educated people who know they feel vaguely anxious and insecure whenever they write however or than me or was or which, but can't tell you why.

Pullum has argued, for example, that the authors misunderstood what constitutes the passive voice, and he criticized their proscription of established and unproblematic English usages, such as the split infinitive and the use of which in a restrictive relative clause. On Language Log, a blog about language written by linguists, he further criticized The Elements of Style for promoting linguistic prescriptivism and hypercorrection among Anglophones, and called it "the book that ate America's brain".

Jan Freeman, reviewing for The Boston Globe in 2005 described the latest edition of The Elements of Style Illustrated (2005), with illustrations by Maira Kalman, as an "aging zombie of a book ... a hodgepodge, its now-antiquated pet peeves jostling for space with 1970s taboos and 1990s computer advice".

== Editions ==
=== Strunk ===
- The Elements of Style. Composed in 1918 and privately printed in 1919. 43 pages. OCLC 6589433.
- The Elements of Style. New York: Harcourt, Brace and Howe, 1920. 52-page publication of the original. OCLC 919826229

Because Strunk's text is now in the public domain, publishers can and do reprint it.

=== Strunk & Edward A. Tenney ===
- The Elements and Practice of Composition. New York: Harcourt, Brace, 1935. OCLC 781988921 (Despite the new title, it is a revision of The Elements of Style. Tenney was a fellow instructor at Cornell. This edition included student exercises.)

=== Strunk & White ===
- The Elements of Style. New York: Macmillan, 1959. OCLC 878906498.
- The Elements of Style. 2nd ed. New York: Macmillan; London: Collier-Macmillan, 1972. ISBN 0024182605.
- The Elements of Style. 3rd ed. New York: Macmillan, 1979. ISBN 0024181900 (hardback), ISBN 0024182001 (paperback).
- The Elements of Style. 4th ed. S.l.: Longman, 1999. Hardback. ISBN 0-205-31342-6 (hardback). S.l.: Longman, 2000. ISBN 0-205-30902-X (paperback). With a foreword by Roger Angell.
- The Elements of Style. Fiftieth Anniversary Edition. New York: Pearson Longman, 2009. ISBN 0-205-63264-5. (Contains 4th ed. text)

=== Illustrated edition ===
- The Elements of Style Illustrated. With illustrations by Maira Kalman. Penguin, 2005. ISBN 1-594-20069-6 (hardback). Penguin, 2005. ISBN 9780910301961 (hardback). Penguin. ISBN 9780143112723 (paperback). Penguin, 2008. ISBN 9781439562635 (paperback).

== See also ==
- A Dictionary of Modern English Usage (1926) by H. W. Fowler
- The Complete Plain Words (1954) by Sir Ernest Gowers
- Style: Lessons in Clarity and Grace (1981) by Joseph M. Williams

Several books were titled paying homage to Strunk's, for example:

- The Elements of Programming Style
- The Elements of Typographic Style
