= X. J. Kennedy =

American poet (1929–2026)

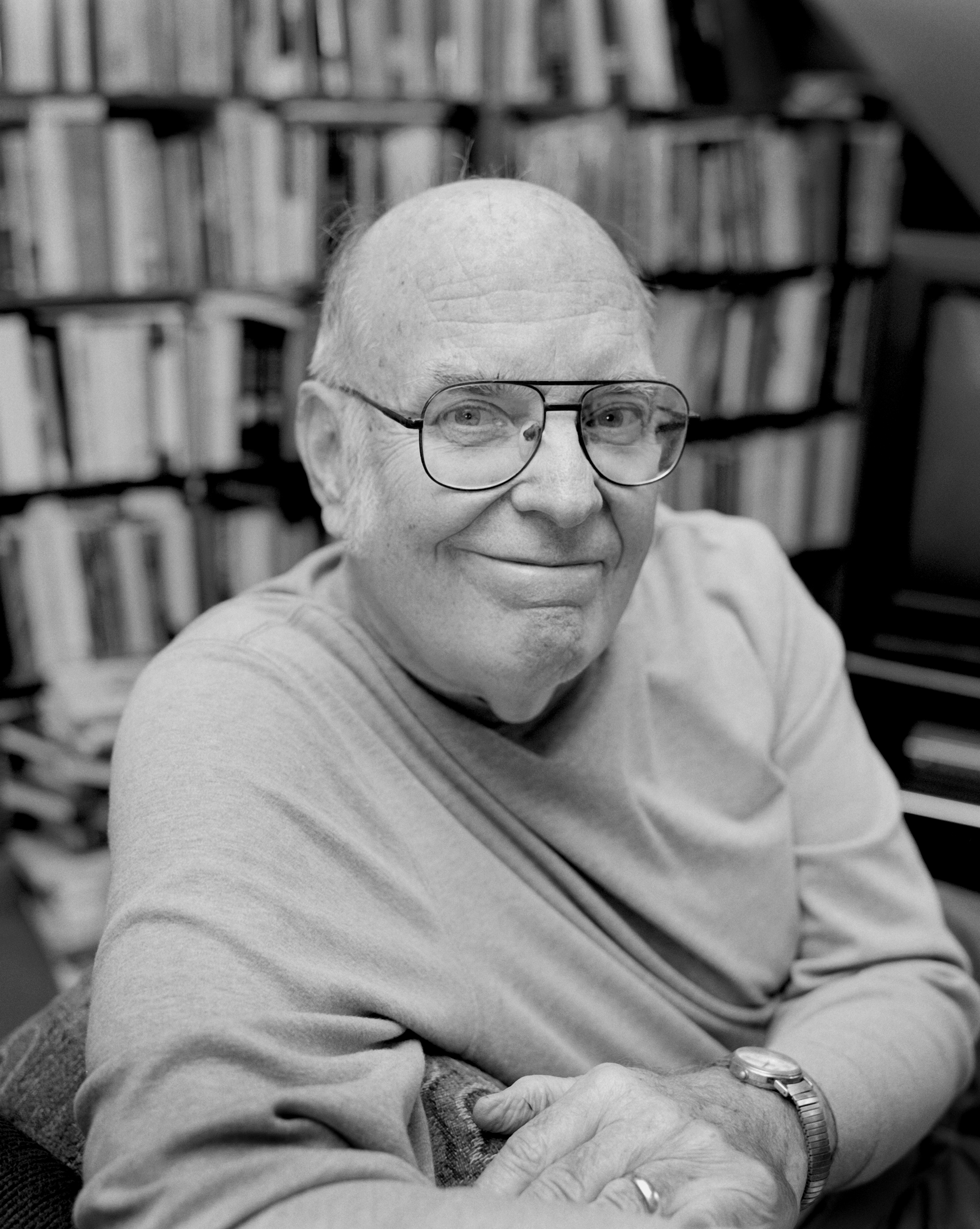
- Kennedy in 2017
- Born: Joseph Charles Kennedy; August 21, 1929; Dover, New Jersey, U.S.
- Died: January 30, 2026 (aged 96); Peabody, Massachusetts, U.S.
- Education: Bachelor of Science (1950); Master of Arts (1951)
- Alma mater: Seton Hall University; Columbia University
- Occupations: Poet; translator; anthologist; editor; author
- Spouse: Dorothy Mintzlaff (m. 1962; died 2018)
- Children: 5
- Writing career
- Pen name: Joe Kennedy
- Period: 1945–2026
- Genres: Science fiction; Pulp fiction
- Subjects: English literature; Poetry; Children's literature
- Literary movement: Fanzines; Science fiction fandom
- Website: Official website at the Wayback Machine (archived June 2, 2024)

Joseph Charles Kennedy (August 21, 1929 – January 30, 2026), known by the pen name X. J. Kennedy, was an American poet, translator, anthologist, editor, and author of children's literature and textbooks on English literature and poetry. He was long known as Joe Kennedy; but, wishing to distinguish himself from Joseph P. Kennedy Sr., he added an "X" as his first initial.

== Early life and academic career ==
In his youth, under the name Joe Kennedy, he was an active member of science fiction fandom and published well-regarded fanzines, including Vampire (a quarterly, 1945–1947) and the Vampire Annuals. He was a member of several amateur press associations, and co-founded the still-extant Spectator Amateur Press Association (SAPS). Between 1947 and 1953 he wrote science fiction stories for pulp magazines using the names Joe Kennedy or Joquel Kennedy.

Kennedy attended Seton Hall University (BSc, 1950) and Columbia University (MA, 1951). After serving for four years as an enlisted journalist with the U.S. Navy's Atlantic Fleet, he studied at the Sorbonne from 1955 to 1956. Kennedy then spent the next six years pursuing a graduate degree in English at the University of Michigan but did not complete his Ph.D. There he met his future wife Dorothy Mintzlaff, who was a fellow graduate student.

Kennedy taught English at Michigan, the University of North Carolina at Greensboro, and Tufts University (1963–1978), with visiting professorships at Wellesley College; the University of California, Irvine; and the University of Leeds.

== Writing career ==
In the early 1970s, Kennedy and his wife Dorothy co-edited the influential journal Counter/Measures, a precursor in the New Formalist movement to The Reaper and The Formalist. He also served as poetry editor of The Paris Review. Kennedy's poetry has been published in The New Yorker, Poetry, and The Hudson Review. He became a freelance writer in 1978.

Kennedy is most recognized for his light verse, and was the first recipient of the American Academy of Arts and Letters' Michael Braude Award for Light Verse. His first book, Nude Descending a Staircase, won the 1961 Lamont Poetry Prize of the Academy of American Poets, and his dozens of books have won awards, including Guggenheim and National Arts Council fellowships, a grant from the National Endowment for the Arts, the Bess Hokin Prize from Poetry magazine, and a Los Angeles Times Book Award for poetry (in 1985 for Cross Ties: Selected Poems), the 1969–1970 Shelley Memorial Award, the Golden Rose of the New England Poetry Club, honorary degrees from Lawrence and Adelphi Universities and Westfield State College. Kennedy received the National Council of Teachers of English Year 2000 Award for Excellence in Children's Poetry. He received the 2004 Poets' Prize for his work, The Lords of Misrule: Poems 1992–2002. Kennedy accepted the Poetry Society of America's Robert Frost Medal for lifetime service to poetry in 2009. In 2015, he received the Jackson Poetry Prize, awarded by Poets & Writers.

Kennedy also wrote a series of children's poetry books (Brats), translated Aristophanes' Lysistrata into English, and edited the anthology Tygers of Wrath: Poems of Hate, Anger, and Invective (University of Georgia Press, 1981). Kennedy edited several editions of the textbook anthology Literature: An Introduction to Fiction, Poetry, and Drama. With his wife Dorothy and scholar Jane E. Aaron, he was the editor of The Bedford Reader, a collegiate literature textbook used for teaching to the AP English Language and Composition test.

== Personal life and death ==
Kennedy had five children and six grandchildren with his wife Dorothy Mintzlaff Kennedy (1931–2018), and he resided in Peabody, Massachusetts. He died there on January 30, 2026, at the age of 96.

== Bibliography ==
=== For adults ===
Each year of first publication or revised edition links to its corresponding "[year] in poetry" article, for poetry, or "[year] in literature" article, for plays and prose:

- 1961: Nude Descending a Staircase: Poems, Songs, a Ballad New York: Doubleday (reprint edition in the Classic Contemporary Series, Carnegie Mellon University Press, 1994)
- 1969: Growing into Love, New York: Doubleday
- 1970: Bulsh, Providence, Rhode Island: Burning Deck
- 1971: Breaking and Entering, New York: Oxford University Press
- 1971: Editor, with James Camp and Keith Waldrop: Pegasus Descending: A Book of the Best Bad Verse, New York: Macmillan (Burning Deck, 2003, reprint edition)
- 1974: Emily Dickinson in Southern California, Boston: Godine
- 1974: Celebrations after the Death of John Brennan, Lincoln, Massachusetts: Penmaen
- 1975: With James Camp and Keith Waldrop, Three Tenors, One Vehicle, Columbia, Missouri: Open Places Poet Series
- 1981: Editor: Tygers of Wrath: Poems of Hate, Anger, and Invective, with wood engravings by Michael McCurdy, Athens, Georgia: University of Georgia Press
- 1983: Translator: French Leave: Translations, (from the French), Edgewood, Kentucky: Robert L. Barth
- 1983: Missing Link, Secaucus, New Jersey: Scheidt Head
- 1984: Hangover Mass, Cleveland: Bits Press
- 1985: Cross Ties: Selected Poems, Athens, Georgia: University of Georgia Press
- 1990: Winter Thunder, Edgewood, Kentucky: Robert L. Barth
- 1992: Dark Horses: New Poems, Baltimore: Johns Hopkins University Press
- 1994: Jimmy Harlow, Cugiak, Alaska: Salmon Run Press
- 1999: Aristophanes Lysistrata, a new English version by X.J. Kennedy from Aristophones, Volume 2 (The Penn Complete Greek Drama Series), edited by David R. Slavitt & Palmer Bovie, University of Pennsylvania Press
- 2002: The Lords of Misrule: Poems, 1992–2001, Johns Hopkins University Press
- 2007: In a Prominent Bar in Secaucus: New and Selected Poems, 1955–2007, Johns Hopkins University Press
- 2014: A Hoarse Half-Human Cheer, Curtis Brown Unlimited (a novel)
- 2016: That Swing: Poetry, 2008–2016, Johns Hopkins: Poetry and Fiction

=== For students ===
All but Literature: An Introduction (1976) are intended as college texts but have been used by high school students:

- 1963: Editor with James Camp: Mark Twain's Frontier: A Textbook of Primary Source Materials Research and Writing, New York: Holt
- 1966: An Introduction to Poetry, Boston: Little, Brown (8th edition, with Dana Gioia, New York: HarperCollins, 1993)
- 1973: Editor: Messages: A Thematic Anthology of Poetry, Boston: Little, Brown
- 1976: An Introduction to Fiction, Boston: Little, Brown (6th edition, with Dana Gioia, New York: HarperCollins, 1995) (Pearson/Longman, 10th edition, 2007)
- 1976: An Introduction to Poetry, Boston: Little, Brown (8th edition, with Dana Gioia, New York: HarperCollins, 1993) (Pearson/Longman, 13th edition, 2009)
- 1976: Literature: An Introduction to Fiction, Poetry, and Drama, Boston: Little, Brown (7th edition, with Dana Gioia, New York: Longman, 1999; 3rd compacted edition, with Dana Gioia, Longman, 2002) (Pearson/Longman, 10th edition; this edition is also available as a boxed set of four separate paperbacks, as Literature, Portable Edition)
- 1982: With Dorothy M. Kennedy: The Bedford Reader, New York: St. Martin's (4th edition, with Jane E. Aaron, 1991; abridged as The Brief Bedford Reader, 1994) (Bedford/St. Martin's Press, 14th edition, 2006); an abridged edition, The Brief Bedford Reader (14th edition) is also available
- 1987: With Dorothy M. Kennedy: The Bedford Guide for College Writers, New York: St. Martin's (4th edition, with Dorothy M. Kennedy and Sylvia A. Holliday, 1996), a later edition was written with the same authors and Marcia F. Muth (Bedford/St. Martin's Press, 11th edition)
- 2005: Handbook of Literary Terms, with Dana Gioia, and Mark Bauerlein; Pearson/Longman (also available as a trade paperback as The Longman Dictionary of Literary Terms, 2006)
- 2007: Writing and Revising: A Portable Guide by X.J. Kennedy, Dorothy M. Kennedy, and Marcia F. Muth; Bedford/St. Martin's Press

=== For children ===
Each year of first publication or revised edition links to its corresponding "[year] in poetry" article, for poetry, or "[year] in literature" article, for prose:

- 1975: One Winter Night in August and Other Nonsense Jingles, illustrated by David McPhail, New York: McElderry Books
- 1975: The Phantom Ice Cream Man: More Nonsense Verse, illustrated by David McPhail, New York: McElderry Books
- 1982: Did Adam Name the Vinegarroon? (verse), illustrated by Heidi Johanna Selig, Boston: Godine
- 1982: Editor, with his wife, Dorothy M. Kennedy: Knock at a Star: A Child's Introduction to Poetry, illustrated by Karen Lee Baker (Little, Brown & Company, revised edition, 1999)
- 1983: The Owlstone Crown (novel; also see below), illustrated by Michele Chessare, New York: McElderry Books
- 1985: The Forgetful Wishing Well: Poems for Young People, illustrated by Monica Incisa, New York: McElderry Books
- 1986: Brats, humorous verse, illustrated by James Watts, New York: McElderry Books
- 1989: Ghastlies, Goops, and Pincushions: Nonsense Verse, illustrated by Ron Barrett; New York: Margaret K. McElderry Books/Simon & Schuster
- 1990: Fresh Brats (comic verse), illustrated by James Watts; New York: McElderry Books
- 1991: The Kite That Braved Old Orchard Beach: Year-round Poems for Young People, illustrated by Marian Young; New York: McElderry Books
- 1992: Compiler with D. M. Kennedy: Talking like the Rain: A First Book of Poems, illustrated by Jane Dyer, Boston: Little, Brown
- 1992: The Beasts of Bethlehem, illustrated by Michael McCurdy (Margaret K. McElderry Books/Simon & Schuster, 1992); poems about the Nativity, based on the legend that the animals in the stable could speak on Christmas Eve
- 1993: Drat These Brats!, humorous verse, illustrated by James Watts; New York: McElderry Books
- 1997: Uncle Switch: Loony Limericks by X.J. Kennedy and illustrated by John O'Brien; New York: McElderry Books
- 1992: Editor, with Dorothy M. Kennedy: Talking Like the Rain: A Read-to-me Book of Poems, illustrated by Jane Dyer; Boston: Little, Brown & Company
- 1997: The Eagle as Wide as the World, novel for children, sequel to The Owlstone CrownMargaret K. New York: McElderry Books/Simon & Schuster
- 1999: Elympics, a picture book of poetry, illustrated by Graham Percy New York: Philomel Books/Penguin Putnam
- 2002: Exploding Gravy: Poems to Make You Laugh, by X.J. Kennedy, illustrated by Joy Allen, Little, Brown, ISBN 978-0-316-38423-0
- 2002: Elefantina's Dream, poetry picture book, illustrated by Graham Percy New York: Philomel Books/Penguin Putnam
- 2005: Editor, with Dorothy M. Kennedy: Knee-Deep in Blazing Snow: Growing up in Vermont/Poems by James Hayford, Wordsong/ Boyds Mills
