= The Bedford Reader =

College-level English composition textbook

The Bedford Reader is a college composition textbook published by the Bedford/St. Martin's publishing company. It is edited by X. J. Kennedy, Dorothy M. Kennedy, and Jane E. Aaron. It is widely used in freshman composition courses at colleges across the United States.

The eleventh edition of the book is composed of over seventy essays, one short story, and one poem. It is divided into eleven sections by the various methods of development: narration, description, example, comparison and contrast, analysis, process analysis, classification, cause and effect, definition, argument and persuasion, along with a section on mixing the methods.

The fifteenth edition is the latest edition so far, published in 2023.

== Famous works and authors ==
Numerous essays and stories by noted authors are included in The Bedford Reader. These include:

- An excerpt from Maya Angelou's I Know why the Caged Bird Sings
- "The Lottery" by Shirley Jackson
- "Shooting Dad", the essay that made Sarah Vowell famous
- An essay by Dave Barry
- "Remembering my Childhood on the Continent of Africa", from David Sedaris' Me Talk Pretty One Day
- Jessica Mitford's "Behind the Formaldehyde Curtain"
- David Foster Wallace's commencement speech for Kenyon College, "This Is Water"
- An excerpt from Michael Pollan's The Omnivore's Dilemma
- Judy Brady's "I Want a Wife"
- Gloria Naylor's "The Meanings of a Word"
- Richard Rodriguez's "Aria: A Memoir of a Bilingual Childhood"
- An excerpt from Barbara Kingsolver's Animal, Vegetable, Miracle
- John Updike's "Extreme Dinosaurs"
- Martin Luther King Jr.'s I Have a Dream speech
- Edward Said's "Clashing Civilizations?" (Said's response to Samuel P. Huntington's "The Clash of Civilizations")
- George Orwell's "Shooting an Elephant"
- Jonathan Swift's "A Modest Proposal"
- Suzanne Britt's "Neat People vs. Sloppy People"
- Brent Staples's "Black Men and Public Space"
- "Dance of the Hobs". by William Least Heat-Moon

The text quickly became a standard in college composition courses across the country. Because of the diversity of works and authors, The Bedford Reader has become popular among Advanced Placement English teachers, specifically those teaching to the AP English Language and Composition test.
