= BiblioVault =

Digital book repository

BiblioVault is a virtual warehouse for academic books that serves more than 90 scholarly publishers in the U.S. and Europe.

Development began in late 2001 under the auspices of the University of Chicago Press, with financial support from the Andrew W. Mellon Foundation.

As of mid 2015, BiblioVault provided long-term secure storage for more than 40,000 digital book files from 110 publishers, and offered scanning, printing, transfer, conversion, file distribution, print on demand and ebook order fulfillment services to its members.

BiblioVault hosts a public web site, bibliovault.org, with information about each title, including descriptions, cover thumbnails, tables of contents, excerpts, and reviews. The site links to member press shopping carts, for immediate online purchase of the books listed. Accessibility offices can request files for students with disabilities from these pages as well.

Member presses visit BiblioVault's publishers' site, to submit and retrieve their files, edit metadata about their titles, and order deliveries of files and metadata to e-retailers, search sites, and printers. BiblioVault is also associated with a digital printing center within the Chicago Distribution Center for short-run printing (and automated physical warehouse restocking) of titles stored in the repository.

Besides making more than file deliveries to e-retailers, such as Amazon Kindle, Barnes & Noble's Nook, Apple Books, Google Play, etc., BiblioVault also fulfills ebooks directly using Adobe Digital Editions for member presses, via the Chicago Distribution Center's online shopping cart and several other independent press shopping carts.

== Services ==
BiblioVault offers a range of services to book publishers and presses. These services include scanning older titles to create high-quality electronic files, short-run digital printing, and evaluation and enhancement of PDFs to ensure they are suitable for printing and conversion to other formats.

One of BiblioVault's key services is the preparation and delivery of files to various marketing services and digital book vendors. This includes platforms such as Google Preview, Amazon Search Inside the Book, and Barnes & Noble's See Inside, as well as popular e-book retailers like Amazon Kindle, Barnes & Noble Nook, and Apple iBooks. By preparing and delivering the necessary files, BiblioVault helps publishers and presses make their titles more easily discoverable and accessible to readers.

In addition to its core services, BiblioVault also offers a range of specialized services. These include the production of excerpts or complete ebooks in PDF, html, or epub formats, as well as custom file alteration and delivery services to meet the specific needs of publishers and presses. The company also offers conversion from PDF to reflowable formats, such as epub and html, which can make e-books more easily readable on a range of devices.

Another unique offering from BiblioVault is the delivery of protected ebooks as complimentary copies for text exam or review purposes. This service allows educators to provide students with electronic copies of books for study and review, while ensuring that the books are protected against unauthorized distribution. BiblioVault also provides fulfillment of electronic books for press shopping carts, making it easy for publishers and presses to sell their titles directly to readers.
