= Rhetrickery =

Dishonest and harmful communication

Rhetrickery is a term defined by Wayne C. Booth in his 2004 book Rhetoric of Rhetoric: The Quest for Effective Communication to describe the “whole range of shoddy dishonest communicative arts producing misunderstanding — along with other harmful results. The arts of making the worst seem the better course.” (Booth, 2004, p 11). Booth views rhetrickery’s poisoning of both political and media cultures as being a key reason for the need for an increase in the teaching of rhetoric.
