= A Rhetoric of Irony =

1974 book by Wayne Booth

- Author: Wayne Booth
- Language: English
- Publisher: University of Chicago Press
- Publication date: 1974
- Publication place: United States

A Rhetoric of Irony is a book about irony by American literary critic Wayne Booth. Booth argues that in addition to forms of literary irony, there are ironies that lack a stable referent.
