= Lawrence McEnerney =

American academic

Lawrence McEnerney is director emeritus of the University of Chicago Writing Program. For four decades, he was part of the "Little Red Schoolhouse" program, a ten-week course in academic and professional writing originally developed by Joseph M. Williams and Gregory G. Colomb. McEnerney received the Quantrell Award in 1997 for his excellence in teaching.

== Early life and education ==
Lawrence "Larry" McEnerney was born to John and Ellen (née Bakke) McEnerney, both United States Army veterans of World War II. His father was a lieutenant in the Army during the war, while his mother served in the Allied Force Headquarters in Africa and Italy. He was raised with one brother and a sister. After the war, his father was a civic leader in Chicago and served as president of Pioneer Electric & Research Corp. (Perco) a small specialty electronics firm involved in manufacturing.

He attended the College of William and Mary (BA, 1976) where he graduated with a degree in English and History. McEnerney arrived at the University of Chicago in 1978 and enrolled in a PhD program for English. He worked as a teaching assistant under Joseph M. Williams and received his AM in 1980. "I discovered that I was bad at scholarship because I didn't like literature", he recalled. "By sheer luck, I had met Joe [Joseph M. Williams] because he was one of the examiners on my preliminary oral exam as a doctoral student. He was sadly disappointed by my grasp of writing. So I went to talk to him about it, and he got me fascinated with what he was doing."

McEnerney left the university in 1981 and returned to his family's business.

== Little Red Schoolhouse ==
In 1979, after advertising around campus for a new writing class, Joseph M. Williams discovered there was student demand for the class. He setup a lecture series before they had time to develop a curriculum. Williams asked McEnerney to return to the university and help develop teaching materials for academic and professional writing, a series of courses that became known as the "Little Red Schoolhouse". McEnerney returned to the campus and began working under Williams, his mentor, and Greg Colomb.

Courses for the Little Red Schoolhouse (LRS) were originally designed for upper-division students but were tailored to improve the advanced writing skills of faculty. McEnerney joined the University of Chicago writing program in 1987, helping Williams divide up lecturing duties training graduate students. He became director of the writing program in 1992. In the 1990s, the majority of their students were from the graduate business school, followed by a mixture from the other divisions and schools.

By the early 2000s, the LRS were training 50 to 60 graduate students on a yearly basis, with the training used to enhance the opportunities of students entering teaching positions. The course is taught as ENGL 13000/33000, "Academic and professional writing: Little Red Schoolhouse (LRS)". McEnerney also taught introductory courses in the Humanities and Social Sciences Core, a liberal arts program that teaches several thousand students per year and provides tutoring. In the 2010s, he taught courses on the speeches of Ronald Reagan and Barack Obama. Several recordings of McEnerney's class lectures for the LRS course became popular on YouTube from 2014 to 2015. One video lecture titled "The Craft of Writing Effectively" currently has 8.8 million views.

== Approach ==
McEnerney is known for his reader-focused approach, encouraging students to improve their writing by tailoring it to the needs of their audience and de-emphasizing the rules and notions of writing as a "standardized skill". Like Williams, McEnerney dismisses any strict rule against passive verbs. "A lot of bad stuff comes out of that rule", he told an interviewer.

== Personal life ==
From 2009 until his retirement in 2020, he and his wife Cathe were resident deans of the Renee Granville-Grossman Residential Commons. Cathe is a textile arts educator and former president of the American Needlepoint Guild.

McEnerney is a fan of Abraham Lincoln and cites the Gettysburg Address and Abraham Lincoln's second inaugural address as the two texts he studied the most. He has also spoken and written about the address in university literature and community events, and taught the address in courses to students. At the beginning of the COVID-19 pandemic in the United States, McEnerney was asked by editor Jim Verhulst of the Tampa Bay Times to share his favorite author whose work could help people find solace in the era of social distancing. McEnerney chose an excerpt from Philosophical Investigations by Ludwig Wittgenstein.

== Awards ==
- Llewellyn John and Harriet Manchester Quantrell Award for Excellence in Undergraduate Teaching (1997)

== Selected works ==
- The Problem of the Problem (2013)
- With Joseph M. Williams. Writing in College (2007)
- With Joseph M. Williams. Writing in the Humanities (1997)
- Hard Copy (1994)
