= Volume (bibliography) =

Book or journal, often in a series

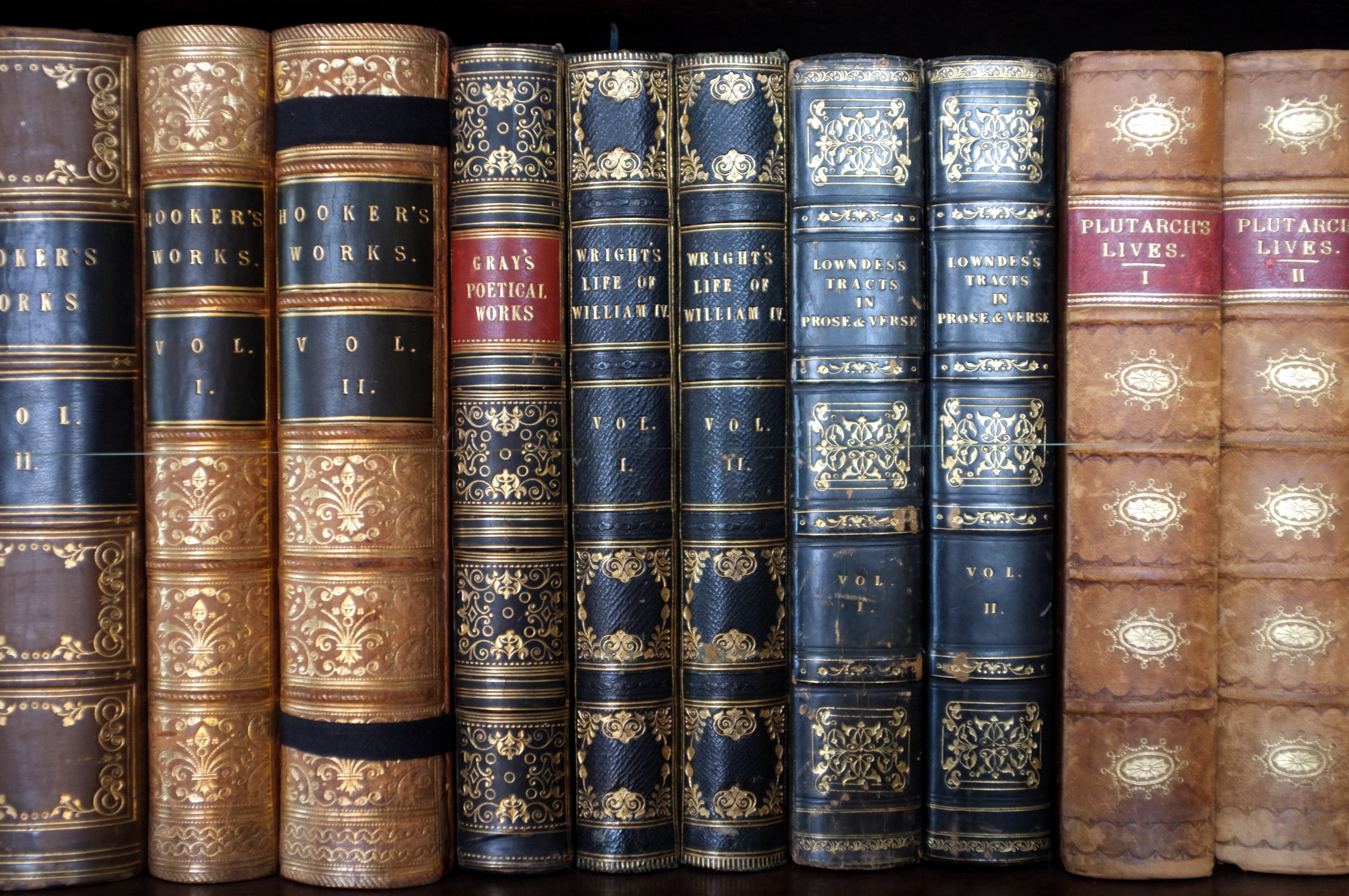
Monographs divided into several volumes

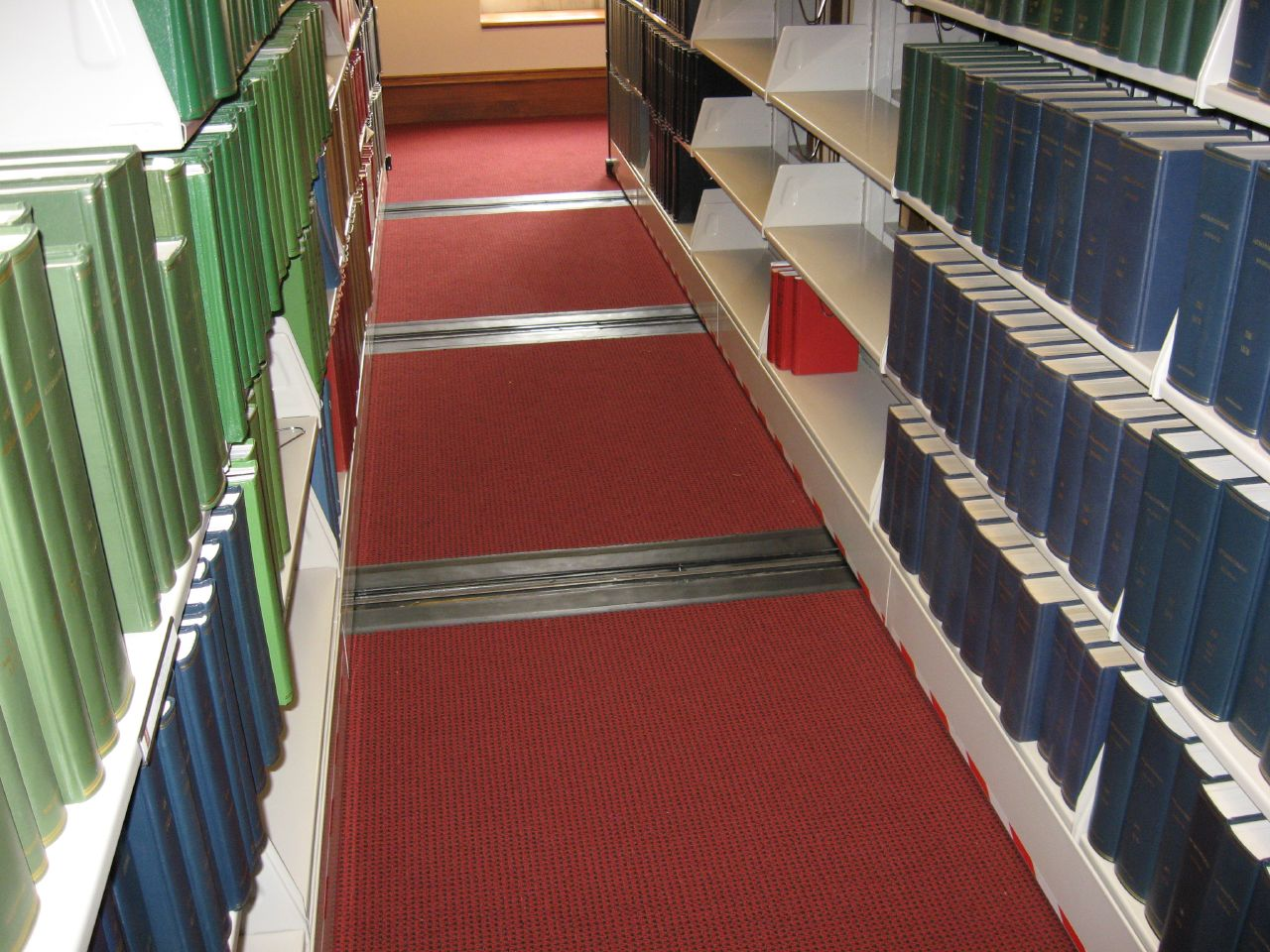
Journal issues bound into volumes in a library

A volume is a physical book. It may be printed or handwritten. The term is commonly used to identify a single book that is part of a larger collection. Volumes are typically identified sequentially with Roman or Arabic numerals, e.g. "volume III" or "volume 3", and commonly abbreviated as "Vol.".

Volumes may be published directly, or they may be created out of multiple bound issues. For instance, a library that subscribes to a periodical and wishes to preserve it typically takes a set of the issues and has them bound into a volume. A publisher may also separately publish a volume out of previously published issues; this is common with graphic novels. A volume may also be composed of entries, as in an encyclopedia, or chapters, as in a monograph.

The term is also used as an identifier for a sequence of periodicals. This is generally based on a single calendar year, but not always. For instance, a school magazine might start each new volume at the beginning of the academic year or at the beginning of each term/semester. Likewise, a journal may start new volumes for each anniversary after its original inception. Thus, all issues published in the Nth term or year will be classified under the Nth volume. The original function of labelling issues with a volume at publication time was to provide a standard way for libraries to later bind the issues into a physical volume.

A part (commonly abbreviated to "Pt.") can be a special sub-division of a volume or it can be the highest level division of a journal. Parts are often designated with letters or names, e.g. "B", "Supplement".

== See also ==
- Book series
- Collection
- Issue
- Journalism
- Magazine
