= Wayne C. Booth =

American academic (1921–2005)

Wayne Booth
- Born: 22 February 1921; American Fork, Utah, United States
- Died: 10 October 2005 (aged 84); Chicago, Illinois, United States
- Notable work: A Rhetoric of Irony; The Craft of Research
- Parent(s): Wayne Booth; Lillian

Wayne Clayson Booth (February 22, 1921 – October 10, 2005) was an American literary critic and rhetorician. He was the George Pullman Distinguished Service Professor Emeritus in English Language & Literature and the College at the University of Chicago. His work followed largely from the Chicago school of literary criticism.

== Life ==
Booth was born in Utah of Latter-day Saint parents, Wayne Chipman Booth and Lillian Clayson Booth. The older Booth died in 1927, when young Wayne was six years old. Booth graduated from American Fork High School in 1938. He was educated at Brigham Young University and the University of Chicago. He taught English at Haverford College and Earlham College before moving back to the University of Chicago. He maintained his membership in the Church of Jesus Christ of Latter-day Saints throughout his life, but took the position that many religions were equally acceptable and sufficient. He was a member of both the American Philosophical Society and the American Academy of Arts and Sciences.

He was president of the Modern Language Association in 1982.

== The Rhetoric of Fiction ==
In The Rhetoric of Fiction (1961), Booth argued that all narrative is a form of rhetoric.

The book can be seen as his critique of those he viewed as mainstream critics. Booth argues that beginning roughly with Henry James, critics began to emphasize the difference between "showing" and "telling" in fiction and have placed more and more of a dogmatic premium on "showing."

Booth argued that despite the realistic effects that modern authors have achieved, trying to distinguish narratives in this way is simplistic and deeply flawed, because authors invariably both show and tell. Booth observed that they appear to choose between the techniques based upon decisions about how to convey their various "commitments" along various "lines of interest," that is, rhetorical means of persuading the audience.

Booth's criticism can be viewed as distinct from traditional biographical criticism (still practiced, especially among popular critics), the new criticism that argued that one can talk only about what the text says, and the modern criticism that argues for the "eradication" of authorial presence. Booth claimed that it is impossible to talk about a text without talking about an author, because the existence of the text implies the existence of an author.

Booth argued not only that it does not matter whether an author—as distinct from the narrator—intrudes directly in a work, since readers will always infer the existence of an author behind any text they encounter, but also that readers always draw conclusions about the beliefs and judgments (and also, conclusions about the skills and "success") of a text's implied author, along the text's various lines of interest:

However impersonal he may try to be, his readers will inevitably construct a picture of the official scribe who writes in this manner -- and of course that official scribe will never be neutral toward all values. Our reaction to his various commitments, secret or overt, will help to determine our response to the work.

This implied author (a widely used term that Booth coined in this book; whom he also called an author's "second self") is the one who "chooses, consciously or unconsciously, what we read; we infer him as an ideal, literary, created version of the real man; he is the sum of his own choices."

In The Rhetoric of Fiction Booth coined the term "unreliable narrator".

Booth also spent several chapters—which include numerous references to and citations from widely recognized works of fiction—describing the various effects that implied authors achieve along the various lines of interest that he identifies, and the pitfalls they fall into, depending upon whether the implied author provides commentary, and upon the degree to which a story's narrator is reliable or unreliable, personal or impersonal.

Booth detailed three "Types of Literary Interest" that are "available for technical manipulation in fiction":

(1) Intellectual or cognitive: We have, or can be made to have, strong intellectual curiosity about "the facts," the true interpretation, the true reasons, the true origins, the true motives, or the truth about life itself. (2) Qualitative: We have, or can be made to have, a strong desire to see any pattern or form completed, or to experience a further development of qualities of any kind. We might call this kind "aesthetic," if to do so did not suggest that a literary form using this interest was necessarily of more artistic value than one based on other interests. (3) Practical: We have, or can be made to have, a strong desire for the success or failure of those we love or hate, admire or detest; or we can be made to hope for or fear a change in the quality of a character. We might call this kind "human," if to do so did not imply that 1 and 2 were somehow less than human.

In the 1983 edition of The Rhetoric of Fiction, which included a lengthy addendum to the original 1961 edition, Booth outlined various identities taken on by both authors and readers: The Flesh-and Blood Author, the Implied Author, the Teller of This Tale, the Career Author, and the "Public Myth"; and, the Flesh-and-Blood Re-Creator of Many Stories, the Postulated Reader, the Credulous Listener, the Career Reader, and the Public Myth about the "Reading Public."

== The Rhetoric of Rhetoric ==
In this book Booth examines Rhetoric arguing that we can not, or more properly ought not to, have rhetoric without ethics. A neologism he produces is rhetrickery. A term he uses to cover the whole range of shoddy, dishonest communicative arts producing misunderstanding - along with other harmful results. The arts of making the worse seem the better cause.

He offers a short history of rhetoric and then argues that rhetoric not only is involved with investigating reality but in creating it. He suggest three types of rhetoric: Win-Rhetoric, Bargain-Rhetoric, and Listening-Rhetoric; which he further breaks down into sub-kinds.

One of his key themes is that those using rhetoric should both be listening to and thinking about the audience and their welfare, and that their rhetoric should be moderated by what they think is being heard.

== Other works ==
A later work is Modern Dogma and the Rhetoric of Assent, in which Booth defines rhetoric as the art of finding warrantable beliefs. Booth addresses the question of what circumstances should cause one to change one's mind, discussing what happens in situations where two diametrically opposed systems of belief are in argument. His central example is an incident at the University of Chicago, when some students and administrators were engaged in fierce debate that eventually degenerated into each side simply reprinting the other side's arguments without comment, believing that the opposing side was so self-evidently absurd that to state its propositions was to refute them.

Another book of note is 1974's A Rhetoric of Irony, in which Booth examines the long tradition of irony and its use in literature. It is probably his second most popular work after The Rhetoric of Fiction.

In The Company We Keep: An Ethics of Fiction (1988), Booth returns to the topic of rhetorical effects in fiction, and "argues for the relocation of ethics to the center of our engagement with literature" (cover note, The Company we Keep). It is a widely cited contribution to the field of literature and ethics or ethical criticism, building on his arguments in Critical Understanding (1979).

== Honors ==
In 1972, Booth received the University of Chicago's Quantrell Award for undergraduate teaching.

The University of Chicago Wayne C. Booth Graduate Student Prize for Excellence in Undergraduate Teaching was established in 1991 in his honor. The award is given out annually.

Additionally, the Wayne and Phyllis Booth House within the University of Chicago College Housing is named in honor of him and his wife.

== Works ==
- — (1983) [1961], The Rhetoric of Fiction, University of Chicago Press, ISBN 9780226065588.
- — (c. 1963), Boring from Within: The Art of the Freshman Essay (pamphlet).
- Booth, Wayne C., ed. (1967), Knowledge Most Worth Having, University of Chicago Press, ISBN 9780226065762.
- — (1970), Now Don't Try to Reason with Me: Essays and Ironies for a Credulous Age, University of Chicago Press, ISBN 9780226065809.
- — (1971a), Autobiography of Relva Booth Ross.
- — (1971b), Booth Family History.
- — (1974a), A Rhetoric of Irony, University of Chicago Press, ISBN 9780226065533.
- — (1974b), Modern Dogma & the Rhetoric of Assent, Ward-Phillips Lectures in English Language and Literature, University of Chicago Press, ISBN 9780226065724.
- — (1979), Critical Understanding: The Powers and Limits of Pluralism, University of Chicago Press, ISBN 9780226065557.
- —; Marshall W.Gregory (1987), The Harper and Row Rhetoric: Writing As Thinking, Thinking As Writing.
- —; Marshall W.Gregory (1988a), The Harper & Row Reader: Liberal Education Through Reading & Writing.
- — (1988b), The Company We Keep: An Ethics of Fiction, University of California Press, ISBN 978-0-520-06203-0.
- — (1988c), The Vocation of a Teacher: Rhetorical Occasions, 1967-1988, University of Chicago Press, ISBN 9780226065823.
- — (1990), The Art of Deliberalizing: A Handbook for True Professionals.
- Booth, Wayne C., ed. (1996a) [1992], The Art of Growing Older: Writers on Living and Aging, University of Chicago Press, ISBN 9780226065496.
- —; Gregory G. Colomb; Joseph M. Williams (2008) [1995], The Craft of Research, University of Chicago Press, ISBN 9780226065663.
- —; Louise Michelle Rosenblatt (1996b), Literature as Exploration.
- — (1999), For the Love of It: Amateuring & Its Rivals, University of Chicago Press, ISBN 9780226065861.
- — (2004), Rhetoric of Rhetoric: The Quest for Effective Communication, Blackwell Manifesto.
- — (2006a), My Many Selves: The Quest for a Plausible Harmony, Utah State University Press, ISBN 9780874215359.
- — (2006b), Walter Jost (ed.), The Essential Wayne Booth, University of Chicago Press, ISBN 9780226065922.
- — (2010), Walter Jost (ed.), The Knowing Most Worth Doing, University of Virginia Press.
