= The Chicago Manual of Style =

Academic style guide for American English

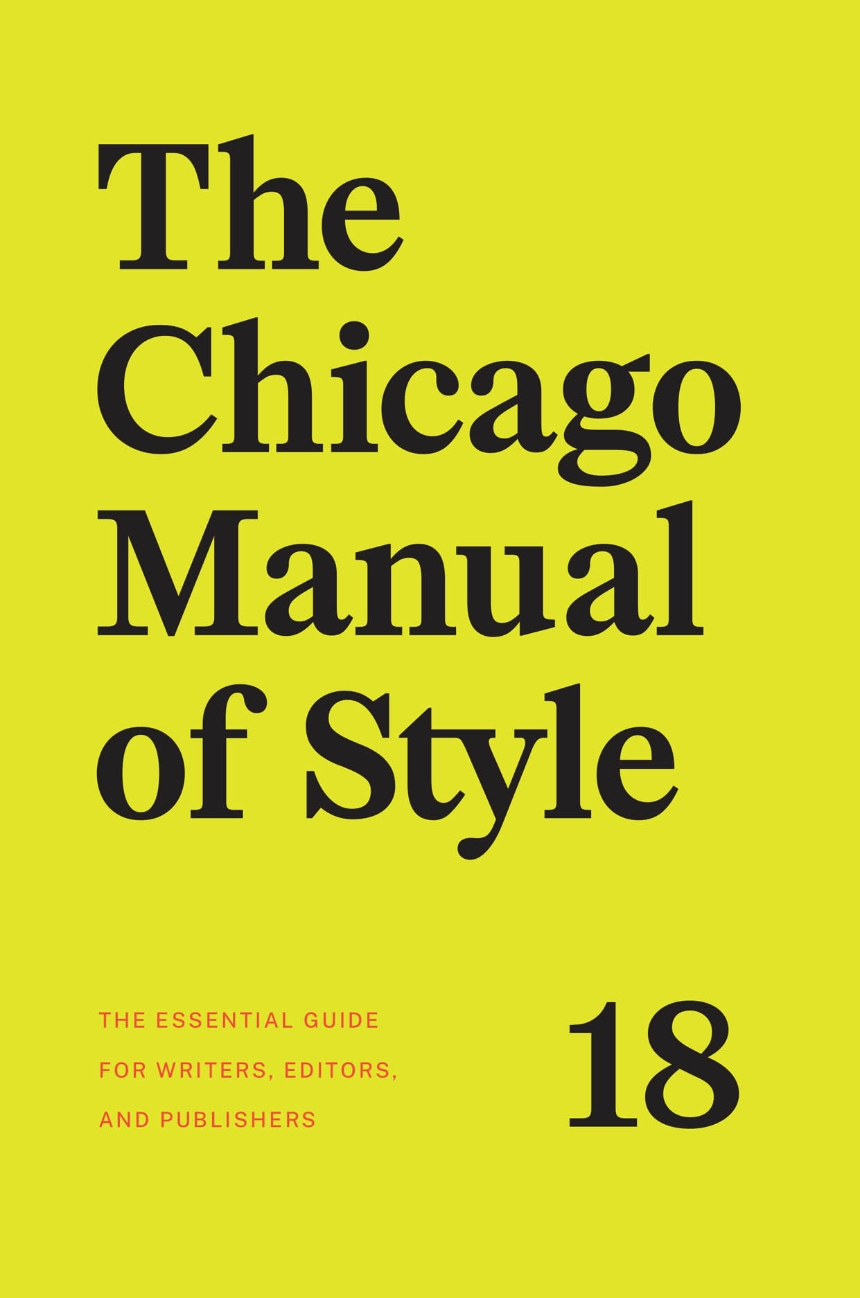
- Cover of the 18th edition (2024)
- Original title: Manual of style: Being a compilation of the typographical rules in force at the University of Chicago Press, to which are appended specimens of type in use
- Language: English
- Genre: Style guide
- Publisher: University of Chicago Press
- Publication date: 1906–2024
- Publication place: United States
- Media type: Print
- Pages: 1,192 (18th edition)
- ISBN: 978-0-226-81797-2
- Dewey Decimal: 808.02/70973
- LC Class: Z253 .U69 2024
- Website: The Chicago Manual of Style Online

The Chicago Manual of Style (CMOS) is a style guide for American English published since 1906 by the University of Chicago Press. Its 18 editions (the most recent in 2024) have prescribed writing and citation styles widely used in publishing.

The guide specifically focuses on American English and deals with aspects of editorial practice, including grammar and usage, as well as document preparation and formatting. It is available in print as a hardcover book, and by subscription as a searchable website. The online version provides some free resources, primarily aimed at teachers, students, and libraries.

== Availability and uses ==
The Chicago Manual of Style is published in hardcover and online. The online edition includes the searchable text of the 16th through 18th—its most recent—editions with features such as tools for editors, a citation guide summary, and searchable access to a Q&A, where University of Chicago Press editors answer readers' style questions. The Chicago Manual of Style also discusses the parts of a book and the editing process. An annual subscription is required for access to the online content of the manual (access to the Q&A, however, is free, as are various editing tools).

Many publishers throughout the world adopt "Chicago" as their style. It is used in some social science publications, most North American historical journals and remains the basis for the Style Guide of the American Anthropological Association, the Style Sheet for the Organization of American Historians, and corporate style guides, including the Apple Style Guide.

The Chicago Manual of Style includes chapters relevant to publishers of books and journals. It is used widely by academic and some trade publishers, as well as editors and authors who are required by those publishers to follow it. Kate L. Turabian's A Manual for Writers of Research Papers, Theses, and Dissertations is a student-friendly presentation of Chicago style.

== Citation styles ==
Two types of citation styles are provided. In both cases, two parts are needed: first, notation in the text, which indicates that the information immediately preceding was from another source; and second, the full citation, which is placed at another location.

=== Author-date style ===
Using author-date style, the sourced text is indicated parenthetically with the last name(s) of the author(s) and the year of publication with no intervening punctuation.

Research has found that students do not always cite their work properly (Smith 2016).

When page numbers are used, they are placed along with the author's last name and date of publication after an interposed comma.

Research has found that students do not always cite their work properly (Smith 2016, 24).

If the author's name is used in the text, only the date of publication need be cited parenthetically (with or without the page number).

Research done by Smith found that students do not always cite their work properly (2016).

In-text citations are usually placed just inside a mark of punctuation. An exception to this rule is for block quotations, where the citation is placed outside the punctuation.

The full citation for the source is then included in a references section at the end of the material. As publication dates are prominent in this style, the reference entry places the publication date following the author(s) name.

Heilman, James M., and Andrew G. West. 2015. "Wikipedia and Medicine: Quantifying Readership, Editors, and the Significance of Natural Language." Journal of Medical Internet Research 17 (3): e62. https://doi.org/10.2196/jmir.4069.

=== Notes and bibliography style ===
Using notes and bibliography style, the sourced text is indicated by a superscripted note number that corresponds to a full citation either at the bottom of the page (as a footnote) or at the end of a main body of text (as an endnote). In both instances, the citation is also placed in a bibliography entry at the end of the material, listed in alphabetical order of the author's last name. The two formats differ: notes use commas where bibliography entries use periods.

The following is an example of a journal article citation provided as a note and its bibliography entry.

1. James M. Heilman and Andrew G. West, "Wikipedia and Medicine: Quantifying Readership, Editors, and the Significance of Natural Language," Journal of Medical Internet Research 17, no. 3 (2015): e62, https://doi.org/10.2196/jmir.4069.
Heilman, James M., and Andrew G. West. "Wikipedia and Medicine: Quantifying Readership, Editors, and the Significance of Natural Language." Journal of Medical Internet Research 17, no. 3 (2015): e62. https://doi.org/10.2196/jmir.4069.

In order of appearance, the elements of a bibliography entry are:

- The author(s), with the first author's name inverted in the bibliography entry (in this case "Heilman, James M., and Andrew G. West");
- The article title inside quotation marks (in this case '"Wikipedia and Medicine: Quantifying Readership, Editors, and the Significance of Natural Language."');
- The journal title in italics (in this case "Journal of Medical Internet Research");
- The volume (in this case "17");
- The issue preceded by "no." (in this case "no. 3");
- The year and, if specified, month, inside parentheses (in this case "(2015)");
- The page numbers, with notes listing the current reference's specific page number and bibliography entries listing the overall page range (in this case "e62" since the example was published electronically without page numbers); and
- The digital object identifier (in this case "doi:10.2196/jmir.4069").

== History ==
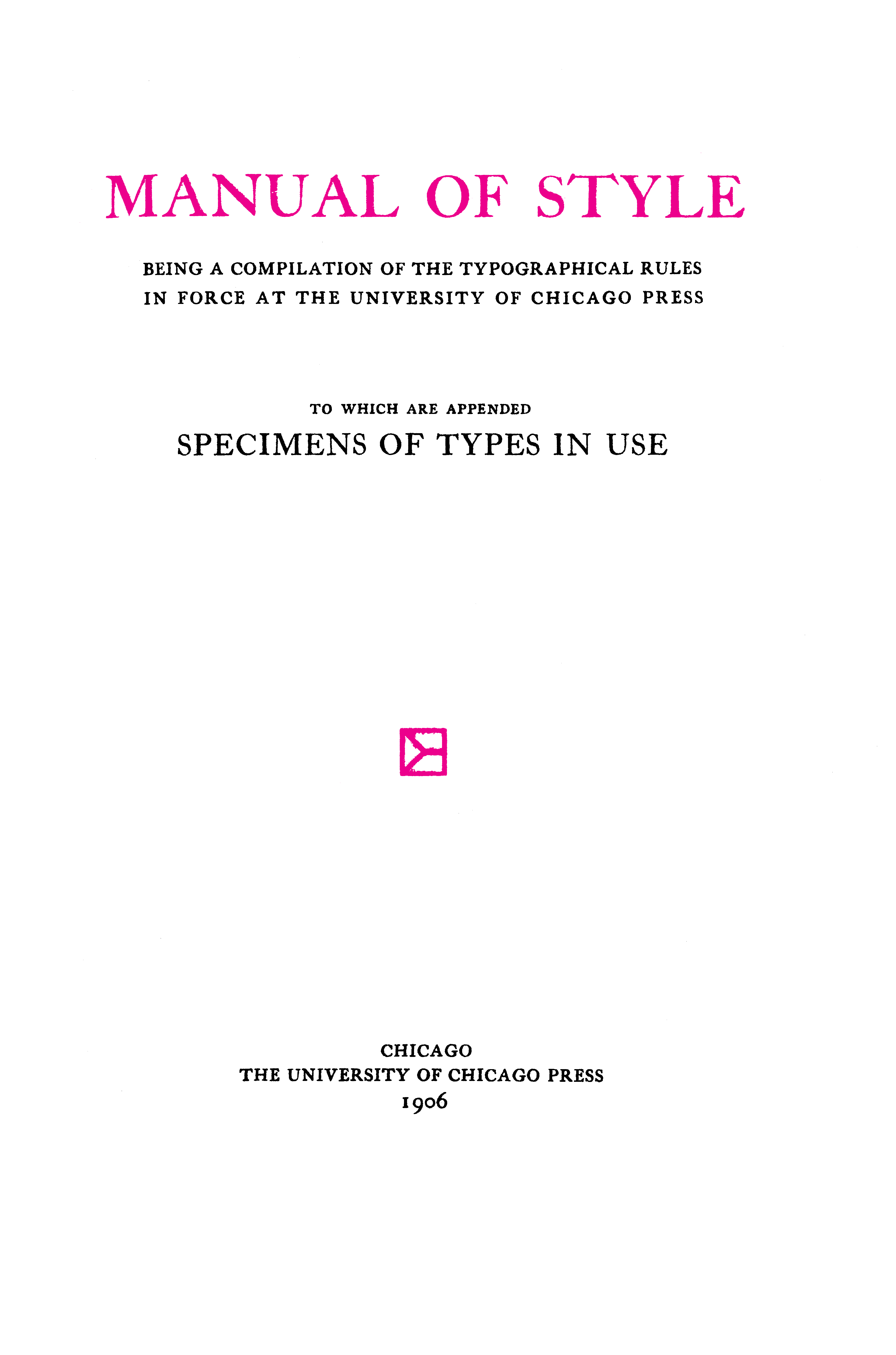
Title page of the first edition of the Chicago Manual of Style (1906)

What now is known as The Chicago Manual of Style was first published in 1906 under the title Manual of Style: Being a compilation of the typographical rules in force at the University of Chicago Press, to which are appended specimens of type in use. From its first 203-page edition, the CMOS evolved into a comprehensive reference style guide. It was one of the first editorial style guides published in the United States, and it is largely responsible for research methodology standardization, notably citation style.

The most significant revision to the manual was made for the 12th edition, published in 1969. Its first printing of 20,000 copies sold out before it was printed. In 1982, with the publication of the 13th edition, it was officially retitled The Chicago Manual of Style, adopting the informal name already in widespread use.

More recently, the publishers have released a new edition about every seven to ten years. The 15th edition (2003) was revised to reflect the emergence of computer technology and the internet in publishing, offering guidance for citing electronic works. Other changes include a chapter on American English grammar and use, and a revised treatment of mathematical copy.

In August 2010, the 16th edition was published simultaneously in the hardcover and online editions for the first time in the manual's history. In a departure from the earlier red-orange cover, the 16th edition features a robin's-egg blue dust jacket (a nod to older editions with blue jackets, such as the 11th and 12th). It also expanded recommendations for producing electronic publications, including web-based content and e-books. An updated appendix on production and digital technology demystified the process of electronic workflow and offered a primer on the use of XML markup. It also includes a revised glossary, including a host of terms associated with electronic and print publishing. The Chicago system of documentation is streamlined to achieve greater consistency between the author-date and notes-bibliography systems of citation, making both systems easier to use. In addition, updated and expanded examples address the many questions that arise when documenting online and digital sources, from the use of DOIs to citing social networking sites. Figures and tables are updated throughout the book, including a return to manual's popular hyphenation table and new, selective listings of Unicode numbers for special characters.

In 2013, an adapted Spanish version was published by the University of Deusto in Bilbao, Spain.

In April 2016, the publisher released The Chicago Guide to Grammar, Usage, and Punctuation, Bryan A. Garner's expansion of his Chicago Manual of Style chapter on the topic, and coinciding with the release of the new edition of Garner's Modern American Usage.

The 17th edition was published in September 2017. It offers new and expanded style guidelines in response to advancing technology and social change. It also includes new and revised content reflecting the latest publishing practices and electronic workflows and self-publishing. Citation recommendations, the glossary of problematic words and phrases, and the bibliography have all been updated and expanded. In the 17th edition, email lost its hyphen, internet became lowercase, the singular "they" and "their" are now acceptable in certain circumstances, a major new section on syntax has been added, and the long-standing recommendation to use "ibid" has changed due to electronic publishing.

The 18th edition, published in September 2024, was the first to recommend omitting publication locations from citations. It added citation styles for A.I. generated text and images, increased the scope of usage of singular and non-binary "they," and abandoned its efforts (since 1969) of writing "Roman" in "Roman numerals" in lowercase. It removed the chapter on mathematics in type (citing low usage) but increased its coverage of citations of Indigenous languages (now with capital "I") and of Korean.

== Recent printed editions ==
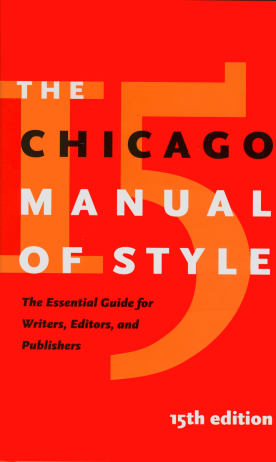
15th

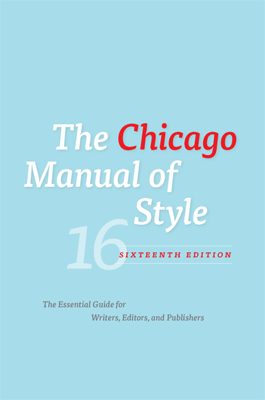
16th

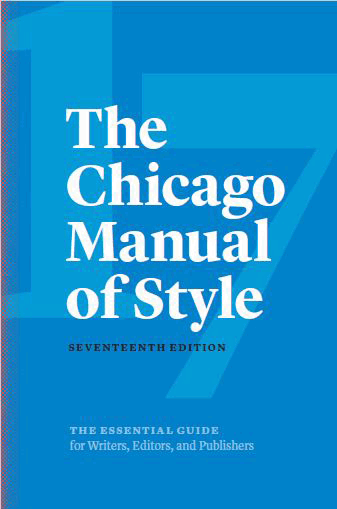
17th

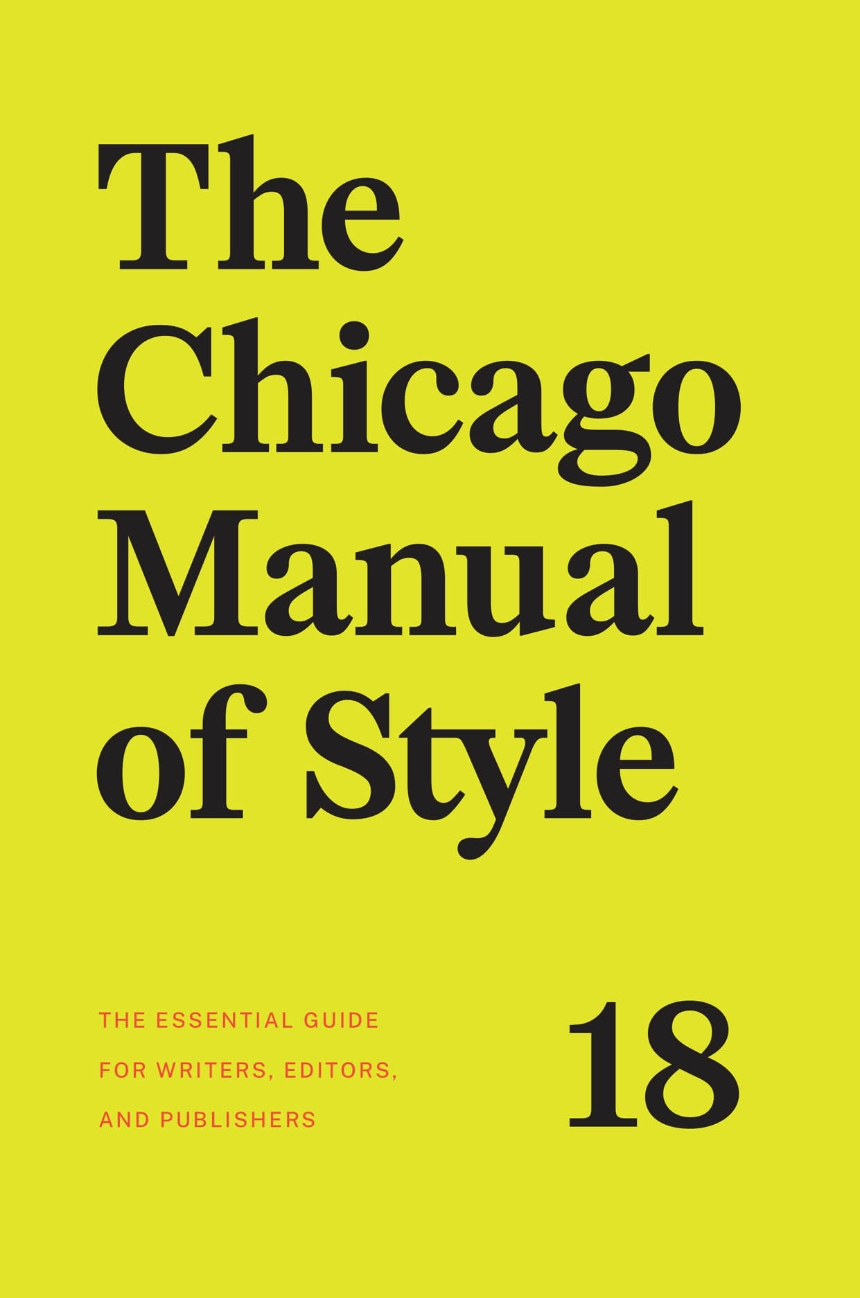
18th
- The Chicago Manual of Style (15th ed.). Chicago: University of Chicago Press. 2003. ISBN 978-0-226-10403-4.
- The Chicago Manual of Style (16th ed.). Chicago: University of Chicago Press. 2010. ISBN 978-0-226-10420-1.
- University Of Chicago Press Editorial Staff, The (2017). The Chicago Manual of Style (17th ed.). Chicago: University of Chicago Press. doi:10.7208/cmos17. ISBN 978-0-226-28705-8.
- University Of Chicago Press Editorial Staff, The (2024). The Chicago Manual of Style (18th ed.). Chicago: University of Chicago Press. doi:10.7208/cmos18. ISBN 978-0-226-81797-2.

== See also ==
- AP Stylebook
- A Manual for Writers of Research Papers, Theses, and Dissertations
- Hart's Rules
- Linguistic prescription
- MHRA Style Guide
