= Style: Lessons in Clarity and Grace =

Book on how to write clearly

- Author: Joseph M. Williams
- ISBN: 0-321-02408-7

Style: Lessons in Clarity and Grace is a book, in many editions, principally by university professor Joseph M. Williams (1933–2008), with coauthoring and (later) posthumous revisions by university professors Gregory G. Colomb (1951–2011) and Joseph Bizup. The book aims to teach people how to write clearly and gracefully. Williams was a professor of English Language and Literature at the University of Chicago. He said, "It is good to write clearly, and anyone can."

== About the book series ==
The original book, first published in 1981, was based on a course, "The Little Red Schoolhouse," that Williams taught for many years at the University of Chicago. The book has since gone through numerous editions and has become a popular text for writing classes. The thirteenth edition was published in 2021.

In the nearly half a century since the first publication, Williams and his main collaborators and successors, Colomb and Bizup, produced at least 19 editions of 3 titles that are all broadly similar in content and purpose and all share a theme of having 10 to 12 chapters that each cover an aspect of clear and graceful writing. All of the books have broadly similar content and purpose, but the new editions periodically aim to further improve and to update the content. The books are:

- Style: Lessons in Clarity and Grace
  - Originally titled Style: Ten Lessons in Clarity and Grace
  - As of 2024, 13 editions through 2021
  - Williams, Colomb, and (later) Bizup
- Style: The Basics of Clarity and Grace
  - As of 2024, 5 editions through 2014
  - Williams, Colomb, and (later) Bizup
- Style: Toward Clarity and Grace
  - As of 2024, 1 edition from 1990, reprinted in many print runs
  - Williams and Colomb (Colomb coauthored 2 of the 10 chapters in this book)

Geoffrey K. Pullum, in his 2024 introductory book on English grammar, included it among books that he recommends as worthwhile reading, unlike various other books from the past that he disrecommends. It was reviewed in 1999 by J. Bradford DeLong, a professor of economics at the University of California at Berkeley and in 2003 by Susan Stepney, Professor of Computer Science, University of York, UK.

== Content ==
All of the tables of contents are broadly similar albeit superficially different, with the chapter count varying from 10 to 12, sometimes nominally called "lessons" and sometimes not. Below is a typical representative.

=== Part One: Style as Choice ===
- Lesson One: Correctness and Style

=== Part Two: Clarity ===
- Lesson Two: Actions
- Lesson Three: Characters
- Lesson Four: Cohesion and Coherence
- Lesson Five: Emphasis

=== Part Three: Clarity of Form ===
- Lesson Six: Framing Documents
- Lesson Seven: Framing Section

=== Part Four: Grace ===
- Lesson Eight: Concision
- Lesson Nine: Shape
- Lesson Ten: Elegance

=== Part Five: Ethics ===
- Lesson Eleven: The Ethics of Clarity
- Lesson Twelve: Beyond Clarity

=== Back Matter ===
- Appendix I: Punctuation
- Appendix II: Using Sources

== Editions ==
- Style: Lessons in Clarity and Grace. 9th Edition. New York: Pearson Longman (2007) ISBN 0-321-47935-1 ISBN 978-0321479358 (paperback), in print
- Style: The Basics of Clarity and Grace. 2nd Edition (2006) ISBN 0-321-33085-4 ISBN 978-0321330857 (paperback), in print
- Style: Toward Clarity and Grace (1990) ISBN 0-226-89915-2 ISBN 978-0226899152 (paperback), in print
- Style: Ten Lessons in Clarity and Grace. Glenview, Ill.: Scott, Foresman (1981, 1985, 1989), New York: HarperCollins (1989, 1994), New York: Longman (1997, 2000, 2003), Toronto: Longman (2005), New York: Pearson Longman (2005), out of print
- Style: The Basics of Clarity and Grace. New York: Longman (2003), out of print
- Style: Toward Clarity and Grace. Chicago: University of Chicago Press (1990) with two chapters coauthored by Gregory G. Colomb, out of print

=== Translations ===
- Korean: 스타일 레슨: 명확하고 아름다운 영어 글쓰기: ISBN 979-1188392018 (2018)
- Chinese (Traditional): 英文寫作的魅力: 十大經典準則: 人人都能寫出清晰又優雅的文章: ISBN 978-9866031564 (2014)
