= Brevitas =

Rhetorical style using a minimum of essential words

Brevitas is a rhetorical style Rhetorica ad Herennium calls "the expressing of an idea by the very minimum of essential words".

By implying more than is said, it is distinguished from tautology and understatement.

Brevitas is related to concision, parataxis, sprezzatura and elliptic style. It contrasts with periphrasis, aureation and pleonasm.
