= Bedford/St. Martin's =

American publishing company

- Status: Active
- Founded: 1981
- Founder: Charles Christensen and Joan Feinberg
- Country of origin: U.S.
- Headquarters location: California, Boston and New York City
- Publication types: Textbooks and Ebook
- Official website: www.bedfordpublishers.com

Bedford Publishers is an American publishing company specializing in humanities college textbooks. Bedford Publishers is part of the Bedford, Freeman, and Worth Publishing group owned by Macmillan, which is in turn owned by the Stuttgart-based Georg von Holtzbrinck Publishing Group. Its offices are in Boston and New York City.

== History ==
The company was founded in 1981 by Charles Christensen and Joan Feinberg as Bedford Books, an imprint of St. Martin's Press. Bedford Publishers stepped in the market of Ebook Publishing in 2016.

Among others works, Bedford Publishers has published The Bedford Handbook and A Writer's Reference by Diana Hacker, Patterns for College Writing, The Bedford Reader, The American Promise, Ways of the World and Writer's Help.

In 2013, Bedford Publishers made a deal with Coursera to offer instructional materials.
