= University of Chicago Press =

Publishing arm of the University of Chicago

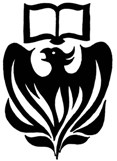
- Parent company: University of Chicago
- Founded: 1890
- Country of origin: United States
- Headquarters location: Chicago, Illinois, US
- Distribution: Chicago Distribution Center (US); John Wiley & Sons (UK)
- Publication types: Books, academic journals
- Official website: press.uchicago.edu

The University of Chicago Press is the university press of the University of Chicago, a private research university in Chicago, Illinois. It is the largest and one of the oldest university presses in North America. It publishes a wide range of academic titles, including The Chicago Manual of Style, numerous academic journals, and advanced monographs in the academic fields. The press is located just south of the Midway Plaisance on the University of Chicago campus.

One of its quasi-independent projects is the BiblioVault, a digital repository for scholarly books.

== History ==
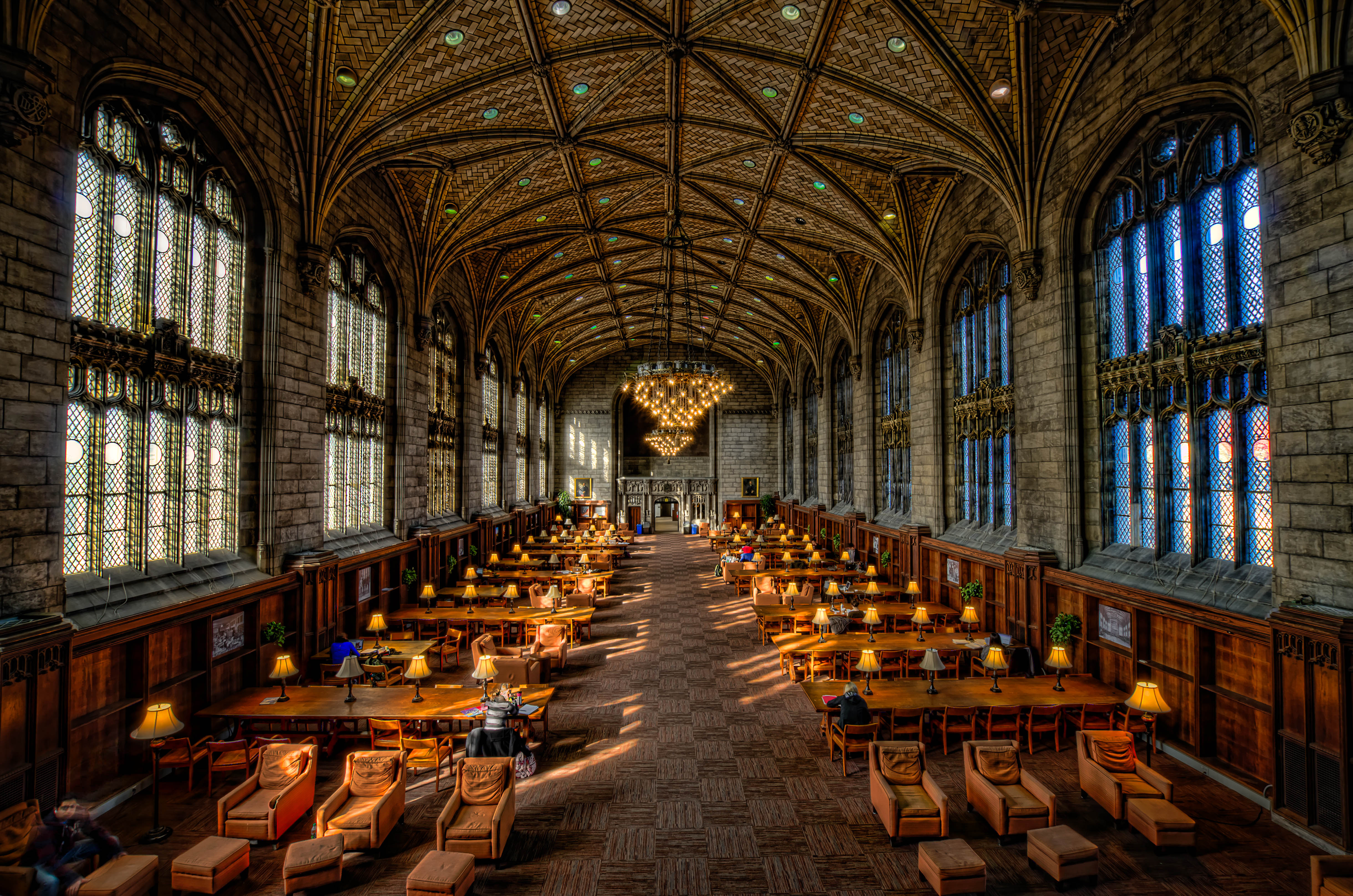
University of Chicago, Harper Library

The University of Chicago Press was founded in 1890, making it one of the oldest continuously operating university presses in the United States. Its first published book was Robert F. Harper's Assyrian and Babylonian Letters Belonging to the Kouyunjik Collections of the British Museum. The book sold five copies during its first two years, but by 1900, the University of Chicago Press had published 127 books and pamphlets and 11 scholarly journals, including the current Journal of Political Economy, Journal of Near Eastern Studies, and American Journal of Sociology.

For its first three years, the press was an entity discrete from the university; it was operated by the Boston publishing house D. C. Heath in conjunction with the Chicago printer R. R. Donnelley. This arrangement proved unworkable, however, and in 1894, the university officially assumed responsibility for the press.

In 1902, as part of the university, the press started working on the Decennial Publications. Composed of articles and monographs by scholars and administrators on the state of the university and its faculty's research, the Decennial Publications was a radical reorganization of the press. This allowed the press, by 1905, to begin publishing books by scholars not of the University of Chicago. A manuscript editing and proofreading department was added to the existing staff of printers and typesetters, leading, in 1906, to the first edition of The Chicago Manual of Style.

By 1931, the press was an established, leading academic publisher. Leading books of that era include Edgar J. Goodspeed's The New Testament: An American Translation (the press's first nationally successful title) and its successor, Goodspeed and J. M. Povis Smith's The Complete Bible: An American Translation; Sir William Alexander Craigie's A Dictionary of American English on Historical Principles, published in four volumes in 1943; John Manly and Edith Rickert's The Canterbury Tales, published in 1940; and Kate Turabian's A Manual for Writers of Term Papers, Theses, and Dissertations.

In 1956, the press first published paperback-bound books (including the Phoenix Books series) under its imprint. Of the press's best-known books, most date from the 1950s, including translations of the Complete Greek Tragedies and Richmond Lattimore's The Iliad of Homer. That decade also saw the first edition of A Greek-English Lexicon of the New Testament and Other Early Christian Literature, which has since been used by students of Biblical Greek worldwide.

In 1966, Morris Philipson began his 34-year tenure as director of the University of Chicago Press. He committed time and resources to lengthening the backlist, becoming known for assuming ambitious scholarly projects, among the largest of which was The Lisle Letters — a vast collection of 16th-century correspondence by Arthur Plantagenet, 1st Viscount Lisle, a wealth of information about every aspect of 16th-century life.

As the press's scholarly volume expanded, the press also advanced as a trade publisher. In 1992, Norman Maclean's books A River Runs Through It and Young Men and Fire were national best sellers, and A River Runs Through It was made into a film directed by and starring Robert Redford.

In 1982, Philipson was the first director of an academic press to win the Publisher Citation, one of PEN's most prestigious awards. Shortly before he retired in June 2000, Philipson received the Association of American Publishers' Curtis Benjamin Award for Creative Publishing, awarded to the person whose "creativity and leadership have left a lasting mark on American publishing."

Paula Barker Duffy served as director of the press from 2000 to 2007. Under her administration, the press expanded its distribution operations and created the Chicago Digital Distribution Center and BiblioVault. Editorial depth in reference and regional books increased with titles such as The Encyclopedia of Chicago, Timothy J. Gilfoyle's Millennium Park, and new editions of The Chicago Manual of Style, the Turabian Manual, and The University of Chicago Spanish Dictionary. The press also launched an electronic reference work, The Chicago Manual of Style Online.

In 2014, the press received The International Academic and Professional Publisher Award for excellence at the London Book Fair.

== Current status ==
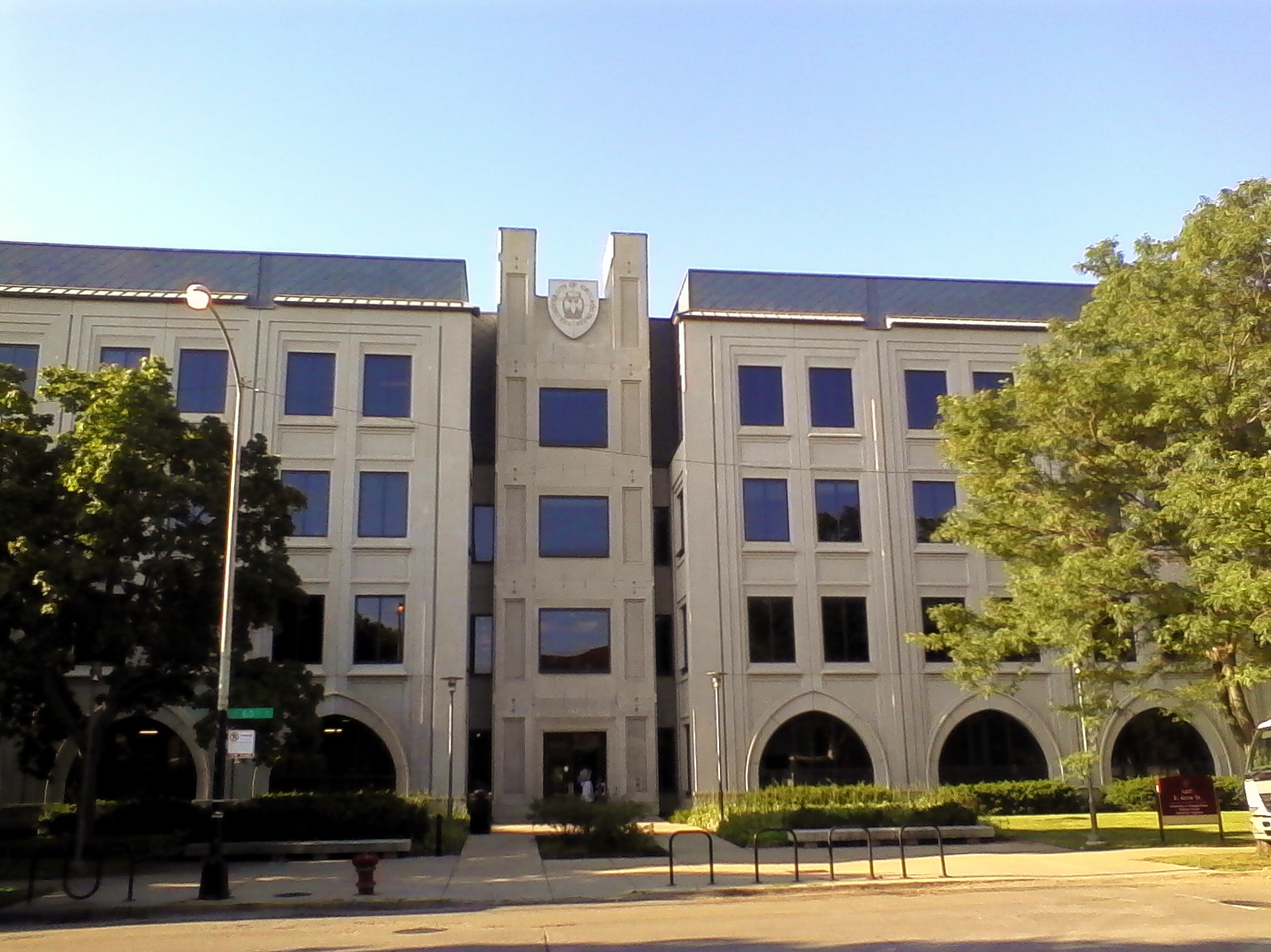
University of Chicago Press

Garrett P. Kiely became the 15th director of the University of Chicago Press on September 1, 2007. He heads one of academic publishing's largest operations, employing more than 300 people across three divisions—books, journals, and distribution—and publishing 92 journal titles and approximately 280 new books and 70 paperback reprints each year.

The press publishes over 50 new trade titles per year, across many subject areas. It also publishes regional titles, such as The Encyclopedia of Chicago (2004), edited by James R. Grossman, Ann Durkin Keating, and Janice Reiff; The Chicagoan: A Lost Magazine of the Jazz Age (2008) by Neil Harris; One More Time: The Best of Mike Royko (1999), a collection of columns by Pulitzer Prize-winning newspaperman Mike Royko of the Chicago Sun-Times and the Chicago Tribune; and many other books about the art, architecture, and nature of Chicago and the Midwest.

The press has recently expanded its digital offerings to include most newly published books as well as key backlist titles. In 2013, Chicago Journals began offering e-book editions of each new issue of each journal, for use on e-reader devices such as smartphones, iPad, and Amazon Kindle. The contents of The Chicago Manual of Style are available online to paid subscribers. The Chicago Distribution Center is recognized as a leading distributor of scholarly works, with over 100 client presses.

=== Books Division ===
The Books Division of the University of Chicago Press has been publishing books for scholars, students, and general readers since 1892 and has published over 11,000 books since its founding. The Books Division has more than 6,000 books in print, including such well-known works as The Chicago Manual of Style (1906); The Structure of Scientific Revolutions (1962), by Thomas Kuhn; A River Runs Through It (1976), by Norman Maclean; and The Road to Serfdom (1944), by F. A. Hayek. In July 2009, the press announced the Chicago Digital Editions program, which made many of the press's titles available in e-book form for sale to individuals. As of August 2016, more than 3,500 titles are available in this format. In August 2010, the press published the 16th Edition of The Chicago Manual of Style simultaneously in print and online editions. The Books Division offers a Free E-book Of The Month program, through which site visitors may provide their e-mail address and receive a link to that month's free, downloadable e-book selection.

University of Chicago Press joined The Association of American Publishers trade organization in the Hachette v. Internet Archive lawsuit which resulted in the removal of access to over 500,000 books from global readers.

=== Journals Division ===
The Journals Division of the University of Chicago Press publishes and distributes influential scholarly publications on behalf of learned and professional societies and associations, foundations, museums, and other not-for-profit organizations. As of 2016, it publishes 81 titles in a wide range of academic disciplines including the biological and medical sciences, education, the humanities, the physical sciences, and the social sciences. All are peer-reviewed journals of original scholarship, with readerships that include scholars, scientists, and medical practitioners as well as interested, educated laypeople. Since 1974, the press has published the prestigious humanities journal Critical Inquiry. The Journals Division has been a pioneer in making scholarly and scientific journals available in electronic form in conjunction with their print editions. Electronic publishing efforts were launched in 1995; by 2004, all the journals published by the University of Chicago Press were available online. In 2013, all new journal issues were also made available to subscribers in e-book format.

=== Chicago Distribution Center ===
The Distribution Services Division provides the University of Chicago Press's customer service, warehousing, and related services. The Chicago Distribution Center (CDC) began providing distribution services in 1991, when the University of Tennessee Press became its first client. The CDC serves nearly 100 publishers including Northwestern University Press, Stanford University Press, Temple University Press, University of Iowa Press, University of Minnesota Press, and many others. Since 2001, with development funding from the Mellon Foundation, the Chicago Digital Distribution Center (CDDC) has been offering digital printing services and the BiblioVault digital repository services to book publishers. In 2009, the CDC enabled the sales of electronic books directly to individuals and provided digital delivery services for the University of Michigan Press among others. The Chicago Distribution Center has also partnered with an additional 15 presses, including the University of Missouri Press, West Virginia University Press, and publications of the Getty Foundation.

== See also ==
- List of English-language book publishing companies
- List of university presses
- William Terry Couch
- List of University of Chicago Press journals
