= Kate L. Turabian =

American educator (1893–1987)

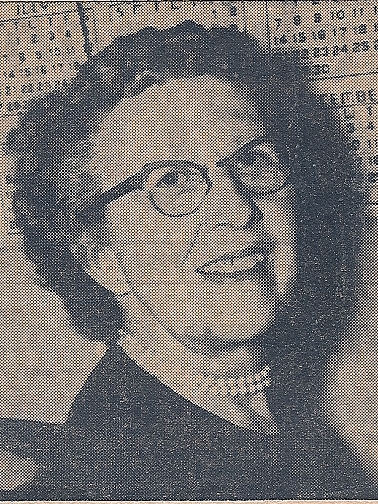
- Turabian, c. 1958
- Born: Laura Kate Larimore; February 26, 1893; Chicago, Illinois, U.S.
- Died: October 25, 1987 (aged 94); Los Angeles, California, U.S.
- Occupation: Educator
- Known for: Author of A Manual for Writers of Research Papers, Theses, and Dissertations
- Spouse: Stephen Gabriel Turabian (m. 1919)

Academic work
- Institutions: University of Chicago
- Notable works: A Manual for Writers of Research Papers, Theses, and Dissertations

Kate Larimore Turabian (February 26, 1893 – October 25, 1987) was an American educator who is best known for her book A Manual for Writers of Research Papers, Theses, and Dissertations. In 2018, the University of Chicago Press published the 9th edition of the book. The University of Chicago Press estimates that the various editions of this book have sold more than 9 million copies since its publication in 1937. A 2016 analysis of over one million college course syllabi found that Turabian was the most commonly assigned female author due to this book.

She was born Laura Kate Larimore in Chicago on February 26, 1893. Her surname, Turabian, comes from her Armenian-American husband Stephen Gabriel Turabian (1882–1967), whom she married in 1919. Turabian was the graduate school dissertation secretary at the University of Chicago from 1930 to 1958. The school required her approval for every master's thesis and doctoral dissertation. The various editions of her style guide present and closely follow the University of Chicago Press's Manual of Style ("Chicago style").

Her A Manual for Writers of Research Papers, Theses, and Dissertations and its associated style are referred to as "Turabian". She died on October 25, 1987 in Los Angeles.

== See also ==
- Diana Hacker
