= William Strunk Jr. =

American professor of English language (1869–1946)

- Born: July 1, 1869; Cincinnati, Ohio, U.S.
- Died: September 26, 1946 (aged 77); Poughkeepsie, New York, US.
- Burial place: Pleasant Grove Cemetery, Ithaca, New York
- Known for: The Elements of Style
- Title: Professor of English at Cornell University
- Children: 3, including Oliver Strunk

Academic background
- Education: University of Cincinnati (BA); Cornell University (PhD)

William Strunk Jr. (July 1, 1869 – September 26, 1946) was an American professor of English at Cornell University and the author of The Elements of Style (1918). After his former student E. B. White revised and extended the book, The Elements of Style became an influential guide to writing in the English language, informally known as "Strunk & White".

== Life and career ==
William Strunk was born and reared in Cincinnati, Ohio, the eldest of the four surviving children of William and Ella Garretson Strunk. He earned a bachelor's degree at the University of Cincinnati in 1890 and a PhD at Cornell University in 1896. He spent the academic year 1898–99 at the Sorbonne and the Collège de France, where he studied morphology and philology.

Strunk first taught mathematics at Rose Polytechnical Institute in Terre Haute, Indiana in 1890–91. He then taught English at Cornell for 46 years, and was elected to Phi Beta Kappa, disdaining specialization and becoming an expert in both classical and non-English literature. In 1922 he published English Metres, a study of poetic metrical form, and he compiled critical editions of Cynewulf's Juliana, several works of Dryden, James Fenimore Cooper's Last of the Mohicans, and several Shakespearean plays. Strunk was also active in a gathering known as the Manuscript Club, an "informal Saturday-night gathering of students and professors interested in writing," where he met "a sensitive and deeply thoughtful young man named Elwyn Brooks White."

In 1935–36, Strunk enjoyed serving as the literary consultant for the Metro-Goldwyn-Mayer film Romeo and Juliet (1936). In the studio he was known as "the professor," in part because, with his three-piece suit and wire-rim spectacles, he "looked as though he'd been delivered to the set from MGM's casting department."

In 1918, Strunk privately published The Elements of Style for the use of his Cornell students, who gave it its nickname, "the little book." Strunk intended the guide "to lighten the task of instructor and student by concentrating attention ... on a few essentials, the rules of usage and principles of composition most commonly violated." In 1935, Strunk and Edward A. Tenney revised and published the guide as The Elements and Practice of Composition (1935).

In his New Yorker column of July 27, 1957, E. B. White praised the "little book" as a "forty-three-page summation of the case for cleanliness, accuracy, and brevity in the use of English." Macmillan and Company then commissioned White to revise the 1935 edition for republication under Strunk's original title. His expansion and modernization sold more than two million copies. Since 1959, total sales of the three editions have exceeded ten million copies.

In 1900, Strunk married Olivia Emilie Locke, with whom he had three children, including the noted musicologist Oliver Strunk. William Strunk retired from Cornell in 1937. In 1945 he suffered a mental breakdown, diagnosed as "senile psychosis", and died less than a year later at the Hudson River Psychiatric Institute in Poughkeepsie, New York. Strunk's Cornell obituary noted that his friends and former students remembered "his kindness, his helpfulness as a teacher and colleague, [and] his boyish lack of envy and guile".
