= Partitive =

Grammatical case

In linguistics, a partitive is a word, phrase, or case that indicates partialness. Nominal partitives are syntactic constructions, such as "some of the children", and may be classified semantically as either set partitives or entity partitives based on the quantifier and the type of embedded noun used. Partitives should not be confused with quantitives (also known as pseudopartitives), which often look similar in form, but behave differently syntactically and have a distinct meaning.

In many Romance and Germanic languages, nominal partitives usually take the form:

[_{DP} Det. + of + [_{DP} Det. + NP]]

where the first determiner is a quantifier word, using a prepositional element to link it to the larger set or whole from which that quantity is partitioned. The partitive constructions of the following languages all have the same translation, with a very similar form:

Language	Nominal partitive
English	three of my friends
Catalan	tres dels meus amics
Spanish	tres de mis amigos
French	trois de mes amis
Italian	tre dei miei amici
Portuguese	três dos meus amigos
Dutch	drie van mijn vrienden
Swedish	tre av mina vänner
Greek	τρεις από τους φίλους μου

Some languages, for example Estonian, Finnish, and Basque have a special partitive case. In Latin, German and Russian, the partitive is expressed by the genitive case, sometimes called the partitive genitive.

== Set partitives and entity partitives ==
Partitives can be distinguished semantically based on whether they involve a part of a whole, called entity partitives, or a subset of a larger set, called set partitives. The embedded NPs in entity partitives denote either entities at the individual level, such as "a cookie" or entities at the group level, such as "Bob and Sue". Some phrases such as ‘the linguists’ can be interpreted as either a group level entity and thus participate in an entity partitive – "half of the linguists"; alternatively, it can be interpreted as a set of entities, and thus participate in a set partitive – "one of the linguists".

Set partitives contain plural countable nouns in their embedded noun phrase (NP), and can be combined with quantifier determiners such as "many", and specific numbers such as "three". Entity partitives can contain either singular countable nouns or mass nouns (and sometimes even plural countable nouns), combining with determiners such as ‘much’, or those with a fractional meaning, like ‘half’. Other determiners can be combined with either type of partitive, including ‘some’, ‘many’, and ‘all’. The following is a list of different quantifier determiners in English and their classification as either participating in entity partitives, set partitives, or both:

Quantifier determiner	Type of partitive	Example
half	Entity	half of the water; half of the cats
20%	Entity	20% of the water; 20% of the cats
one third	Entity	one third of the water; one third of the cats
much	Entity	much of the water; *much of the cats
three (or any number)	Set	three of the cats; *three of the water
many	Set	many of the cats; *many of the water
some	Ambiguous	some of the water; some of the cats
all	Ambiguous	all of the water; all of the cats
most	Ambiguous	most of the water; most of the cats

== The partitive constraint ==
Given the following syntactic structure of partitives, [DP Det. + of + [DP Det. + NP]], the first determiner is a quantifier word which quantifies over a subset or part of the embedded DP, which either denotes a set or a whole respectively. The second determiner is usually an article, a demonstrative, a possessive determiner, or even another quantifier.

Jackendoff proposed a version of the partitive constraint in which the embedded determiner phrase (DP) must be definite, and thus must be headed by a definite determiner, such as "the", "these", or "my".

However, this approach fails to account for phrases such as "half of a cookie," that are partitives and yet lack a definite determiner. De Hoop instead points to the existence of set partitives and entity partitives in formulating the partitive constraint, rather than the definiteness of the NP. She states that:

Only NPs that can denote entities are allowed in entity partitives and only NPs that can denote sets of entities are allowed in set partitives.

1. a) *one of a cookie
   b)  half of a cookie

2. a) *one of the water
   b)  half of the water

(2a) is ungrammatical even though it has a definite article because the denoted entity does not match. "The water" denotes an entity, and "one" is a set entity partitive determiner. (1b) is correct because indefinite and definite singular count nouns denote single entities rather than a set of entities, therefore it is grammatical when proceeded by "half", an entity partitive determiner.

It should also be noted that some linguists consider the partitive constraint to be problematic, since there may be cases where the determiner is not always obligatory. Linguists do, however, agree that universal quantifiers, such as: every, and each, cannot be embedded in the partitive position. Furthermore, the second determiner can be "all" only if the first determiner is a superlative, or fractional expression.

3. a) "The best of all the wines"
   b) "15% of all the relationships"

It has also been hypothesized that perhaps "of" in sentences, such as the above, do not act as the partitive themselves, but rather the superlative in the sentence provides the role of partition.

== Anti-uniqueness ==
Barker claims that partitives are anti-unique; that is, a partitive cannot refer to a unique individual or set of individuals, but must have at least two individuals or sets of individuals in its extension, causing a degree of indefiniteness.

In addition, he limits a partitive to being only able to refer to a proper subset, which he calls proper partitivity. This means that, for example, in the partitive phrase "one of John’s friends", that John must have at least two friends for this to be a proper partitive, and in order for it to satisfy anti-uniqueness by not referring to a unique individual. Similarly, "three of John’s friends" would imply that John has at least four friends, from which an indeterminate three are being referred to.

4. a) I met [one of John's friends].
   b) *I met the [one of John's friends].
   c) I met the [one of John’s friends] that you pointed out this morning.

Furthermore, Barker states that DP partitive constructions cannot be headed by a definite determiner without being modified by a relative clause, that there is some inherent indefiniteness in partitives according to their property of anti-uniqueness. This explains why 4b) is ill-formed, since it is unclear which of John’s friends is being singled out, yet can be made to take a definite determiner by adding context, such as in 4c), which now refers to a single specific friend of John matching the modifier clause.

== Partitives and quantitatives ==
A true partitive should be distinguished from a very similar construction called a quantitative (often called a pseudopartitive, or sometimes a non-partitive).

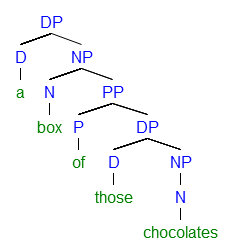
A syntactic tree structure of an English partitive shown in (5a). The structure consists of two noun projections (box and chocolates).

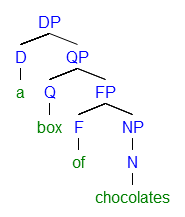
A tree structure for an English quantitative (also called pseudo-partitive) in (5b). The most embedded N (chocolates) projects to FP (Functional Phrase) and "of" is a functional element (F) heading FP. FP then projects to QP (Quantitative Phrase) and Q (box) denotes a quantifier

5. a) A box of those chocolates
   b) A box of chocolates

6. a) *The three of those cars
   b) The three cars

A true partitive, as shown in 5a), has the interpretation of a quantity being a part or subset of an entity or set. Quantitives, simply denote either a quantity of something or the number of members in a set, and contain a few important differences in relation to true partitives.

First off, while partitives cannot be preceded by a definite determiner, such as in 6a), quantitatives can be; 6b) is a well-formed quantitive.

While the NP in partitives is usually preceded by a definite determiner, the NP in quantitive constructions containing "of" cannot be preceded by any determiner; this distinguishes the true partitive in 5a) from the quantitative in 5b), which denotes a quantity of chocolates, but does not denote a smaller quantity of chocolates taken from a larger quantity of chocolates, as 5a) does.

Quantitives can be interpreted as partitives, though, when modified. Consider the example, "three children in the class"; this means "three children out of the children that are in the class", which has a partitive meaning.

One point which is important in distinguishing between partitives and pseudopartitives in English is a separation between two semantically different "of"s. The first is a genitive "of", which indicates a kind-of or type-of relation demonstrated in the phrase "a book of history", in which "of" is used to modify the kind of book denoted, alternatively phrased as the compound noun "a history book". Similarly, "a piece of chocolate" can be analyzed as a certain kind of piece, namely a chocolate piece. The second is a partitive "of", which indicates a part-of relation and means "out of the total number of" in the case of set partitives. A partitive like "a piece of this chocolate" does not refer to any chocolate piece, but a piece taken from the whole of a certain chocolate.

Although the syntactic distribution of partitives and pseudo-partitives seems to be complementary, cross-linguistic data suggests this is not always true. Non-partitives can display an identical syntactic structure as true partitives and the ultimate difference is a semantic one. Vos pointed out that Dutch contains nominals fulfilling the syntactic criterion but lacking a partitive interpretation; they are therefore classified as non-partitives.

een paar van die_{w} grappige voorbeelden
a couple of those funny examples
"a couple of these(such) funny examples"

een paar van die_{s} grappige voorbeelden
a couple of those funny examples
"a couple of these funny examples"

The first Dutch phrase above is classified as a non-partitive. This is counter-intuitive at first glance because the phrase has a Det+of+Det+N sequence which is a consistent structure observed in partitives. A closer look at the Dutch data reveals that in denoting relativation and extraction relationships, non-partitives (or weak indirect partitive construction in Vos’s terminology) function as an adjectival modifier as opposed to ordinary partitives (strong indirect partitive construction) carrying a determiner-like element. Therefore, die_{w} contains an adjectival meaning closer to 'such' and indicates funny examples of a certain type. In the second example, die_{s} is truly a definite determiner and is referring to a particular larger set of funny examples.

== Structural approaches to partitives ==
While a number of linguists have proposed different approaches to account for the partitive structure, three approaches will be introduced here.

=== A functional projection approach ===
In 1995, Guillermo Lorenzo proposed a partitive (π), which is equivalent to the meaning of "out of" in English, is a functional category by itself and projects to a phrasal level. A partitive phrase (πP) is selected by the Numeral (Num) and in turn the partitive head (π) selects the following DP. A Spanish example is shown below:

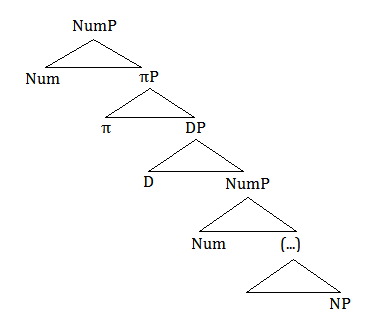
Tree representation of Lorenzo's view of a partitive structure

8. [NumP muchos [πP de[DP estos [NumP [Num° [libr-i+-os] [NP ti]]]]]] 
        many       of    these            book +s

=== Partitive prepositional phrase approach ===
Advocates of the partitive prepositional phrase (partitive PP) approach claim that the partitive meaning is integrated into a PP. Structurally, a quantifier is followed by a noun, and a preposition in between denotes the quantifier is a subset of the following noun.

Within a partitive PP construct, the preposition "of" contains lexical content similar to ‘out of’ and always projects to a PP, hence the name partitive PP. Supporters of partitive PP often assume the presence of an empty noun following the quantifier in order to specify the two sets in relation and the preposition introduces the bigger set. Catalan provides evidence for this underlying structure:

[tres [_{N} e][_{PP} d’aquells [_{N} homes] d’allà]
three {} {} of-those {} men over-there

tres homes d’aquells homes d’allà
three men of-those men over-there

tres homes d’aquells e d’allà
three men of-those {} over-there

In the first example, the notion denotes the set of "three men" is a subset of "those men". The second example has an overt noun inserted between the quantifier and the partitive PP and is still considered grammatical, albeit odd and redundant to a native speaker of Catalan. The third sentence has an empty noun holding the final noun position. Altogether this is taken as strong evidence that an empty noun category should be posited to license a partitive meaning. Alternatively, some linguists argued an empty noun placement is unnecessary if one considers the quantifier’s role to be quantifying a subset. The noun following the partitive PP automatically becomes the bigger set and the whole nominal represents a subset-set relation.

=== Quantifier-based approach ===
Closely related to the partitive PP approach, some authors propose an alternate analysis which also focuses on looking at partitive distribution in nominals. Vos claims that it is the relationship between the quantifier and the noun collectively determine the partitive meaning.

Under this view, the preposition belongs to a functional category and its existence is solely for grammatical reasons. In other words, the preposition is not registered with any lexical content. Vos claims the internal relation between the first and second noun in a nominal partitive implicitly denotes a subset-set, possessive or part-whole relation. Similarly, de Hoop embraces the idea that only when a quantifier pairs with a desired type of DP, specific kind of partitive relation can then be determined. The preposition "of" plays a crucial role in enabling the selected DP to surface.

The deciding factor to label a partitive construction concerns with the presence of an internal DP, as demonstrated in the English examples below:

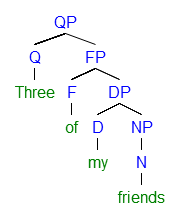
Syntactic tree of English partitive "Three of my friends" under a quantifier-based approach. Note that in a partitive, the noun is embedded in a DP and the preposition of is a functional element, i.e., without lexical content.

Partitives	Pseudo-partitives
three of my friends	three friends of mine
many of those books	many books
a group of those tourists	a group of tourists
a piece of this cake	a piece of cake
a glass of the red wine	a glass of red wine

The nouns in the partitives all refer to a particular bigger set since they are preceded by an internal definite determiner (possessive: my, demonstrative: this and those, and definite article: the). On the other hand, their pseudo-counterparts lack this implication. Without a definite determiner, pseudo-partitives can only denote an amount of things, and the characteristics of a set are determined by the context of the discourse. In addition, the set denoted in a pseudopartitive does not necessarily have to be bigger.

Intuitively, the last two phrases under the pseudo-partitive column do indicate some kind of partition. However, when they are broken down into syntactic constituents, noted in true partitives, the noun always projects to a DP. In contrast, the noun in the phrase-final position projects to a NP (noun phrase) in non-partitives.

== Partitive constructions ==
The partitive nominal construction consists of structure [DP Det. + of + [DP Det. + NP]], as shown in 10a).

10. a) Three of John’s friends.
    b) Three friends of John’s.

A related construction traditionally called the double genitive has been argued by Barker to actually be a partitive, which he terms the possessive partitive (shown in 10b), rather than simply a redundant application of the genitive marker ‘s.

Barker claims that this is a use of the partitive "of", rather than the gentitive ‘of’, distinguishing it from being a gentitive construction. To support this, he notes that prenominal possessives such as "Mary’s child" cannot occur with a following possessor introduced by the genitive "of" such as, "Mary’s child of_{GEN} John". This phrase is illogical, since nominals are syntactically constrained to only allow one possessor. Yet, prenominal possessives can be combined with possessive partitives, containing the partitive "of", such as "my favorite story of_{PART} yours". This phrase is grammatical, taking the meaning "my favourite story out of your stories".

11. a) a picture of John
    b) a picture of John's

Similarly, 11a) does not mean the same as 11b). The first is an instance of the genitive "of", and means that John is in the picture. The second is an instance of the partitive "of", and hence is a possessive partitive; in contrast, it means a picture from the collection of pictures that belong to John, but does not say anything about whether John is in the picture.

12. a) a friend of John's
    b) a friend of John's friend

Nor do 12a) and 12b) mean the same. The first is a possessive partitive, referring to someone who is a member of the set of John’s friends. The second includes a postnominal genitive "of" phrase, and refers instead to someone who is a friend in relation to a member of the set of John’s friends, but not necessarily to John himself.

13. a) three friendsi of [John’s friendsi]
    b) three [ei] of [John’s friendsi]
    c) three friendsi of [John’s [ei]]

The difference between the nominal partitive and the partitive possessive constructions may in fact be a matter of ellipsis in the phonetic forms, as suggested by Zamparelli.

He proposes that the two constructions have the same logical form, for example 13a), where the word friend has the same referent in both positions. Variations then arise in the phonetic form depending on which "friend" word is ellipsed. In the nominal partitive, the first "friend" is ellipsed, becoming 13b), whereas the possessive partitive ellipses the second instance of "friend", yielding 13c).

== Partitive case: Finnish morphology ==
Finnish indicates the partitive by inflecting nouns in the partitive case. An object takes the partitive case under the following three conditions:

The aspectual condition is if the object is governed by an unbounded (or atelic) verb, that is, one which does not indicate the result of an action. The NP-related (quantity) condition is if the object is quantitatively indeterminate, which means indefinite bare plurals or mass nouns. Lastly, the negative condition applies when a predicate is negated, in which case nearly all objects are marked with the partitive.

These three conditions are generally considered to be hierarchically ranked according to their strength such that negation > aspect > quantity. Negation is strongest in that it applies so pervasively to negated events, regardless of aspect or quantity.

An example of the NP-related condition is shown below, borrowed from Huumo:

Löys-i-n voi-ta.
find-PST-1SG butter-PTV
"I found some butter."

Löys-i-n voi-n.
find-PST-1SG butter-TOT
"I found the butter."

In (a), the object is a mass noun, where the partitive case indicates an open, unspecified quantity of butter using the suffix -ta, as opposed to a closed quantity or total object, which Finnish would specify by using the accusative suffix –n, as in (b).

These two examples above show the contrast that exists in Finnish between the partitive object and total object, the former indicating incompleteness of an event or an open quantity. Whereas the partitive object takes the partitive case, the total object can be marked with nominative, genitive, or accusative and indicates aspectual completeness or closed quantity.

Pitel-i-n käde-ssä-ni kirja-a ~ voi-ta.
hold-PST-1SG hand-INE-1SG. book-PTV ~ butter-PTV
"I was holding [a/the] book ~ [the/some] butter in my hand."

Ammu-i-n karhu-a
shoot-PST-1SG bear-PTV
"I shot at the/a bear." /"I shot the bear [but didn't kill it]."
(Whether the bullet actually hit the bear is unknown, but if it hit the bear, it didn't kill it.)

Ammu-i-n karhu-n
shoot-PST-1SG bear-ACC
"I shot the/a bear dead"
(The result of the action is that the bullet hit the bear and killed it.)

In the case of (c), the partitive object is triggered by the unbounded aspect of the verb, not the quantity of the object, since the openness of the quantity is irrelevant. Unboundedness in verbs denotes whether there is a direct consequence following the action of the verb. The verb's aspect is progressive, involving an ongoing action without a specified endpoint, and is therefore unbounded. This aspectual unboundedness requires the partitive object, and has the effect of concealing the quantity of the object. This shows that aspect is stronger than quantity in conditioning the partitive.

In (d) and (e), "to shoot" in Finnish is an intrinsically neither bound nor unbound verb since the shooting can cause the three different results of the target being killed or only wounded or not being hit. (In English, "to shoot" with a direct object has the first two senses and requires additions such as "dead" or "and killed" to not be ambivalent, and the third sense is only possible by adding the preposition "at".) "To kill" would be an intrinsically bound verb, where the consequence is someone/something being dead. In the data, the morpheme "–a" is the partitive morpheme. In (d), the verb "shot" takes a partitive object and specifies the activities of "shooting without killing" or "shooting at but not necessarily hitting". In (e), the verb takes an accusative object and denotes accomplishment of hitting and killing. Hence, the difference of unboundness or boundness in the verb, whether the bear was hit (and killed) by the bullet or not, is reflected by the difference in the morphology of the object.

The common factor between aspectual and NP-related functions of the partitive case is the process of marking a verb phrase's (VP) unboundness. A VP has the semantic property of having either an unbounded head or unbounded argument. For example, in Finnish the partitive case suffix denotes an unbound event, while the accusative case suffix denotes a bounded event. Note that when translating Finnish into English, the determiners could surface as "a", "the", "some" or numerals in both unbound and bound events.

== See also ==
- English articles
- English determiners
- Finnish noun cases
- Partitive case
