= Expressions of zero quantity =

Expressions of zero quantity are noun phrases that describe an empty set of elements in a sentence. These expressions are usually formed with the numeral zero or the quantifiers no and not any, combined with the nucleus or head of the sentence. The head of expressions of zero quantity can be either a countable or an uncountable noun.

== Examples and usage ==
Linguistically, expressions that denote zero quantity are considered to define empty sets of elements. However, the majority of these expressions are commonly constructed with plural nouns and frequently accompanied by plural verbs. In English, in this context, countable nouns are used in the plural form, while uncountable nouns remain in the singular form.

- No books on this subject were found. (Book is a countable noun that takes the plural form and is followed by the plural verb were)
- Zero growth is expected this year. (Growth is an uncountable noun that remains in singular and is followed by the singular verb is)

Additionally, countable nouns may remain in the singular when only a single instance is semantically implied (e.g., "no husband", "no mother") or in fixed expressions (e.g., "no problem," "no idea").

- She has no husband (Husband is a countable noun, but it is presumed to refer to a single instance)
- They see no problem with the car (Problem is a countable noun, yet it is used in a fixed expression)

In English, there are a number of collocations, normally combined with no, used with singular nouns. Most of these are formed with uncountable nouns. Some examples include: no amount, no time, no access, no support, no need, no evidence, no energy, no money, no information.

Cross-linguistically, the realization of zero quantity varies. In languages such French, phrases like "pas de" are used to indicate zero quantity, often followed by a noun in the plural form (e.g., "pas de livres" [no books]). In other languages, singular nouns are preferred in this context. In Spanish, for instance, the expression "ningún" is utilized similarly, typically preceding a singular noun to convey the absence of that noun (e.g., "ningún libro" [*no book]).
