= Universal grinder =

Linguistic concept

In linguistics, universal grinder is the idea that in some languages, most count nouns can be used as if they were mass nouns, which causes a slight change in their meaning. The term "universal grinder" was first used in print by F. Jeffry Pelletier in 1975, after a personal suggestion by David Lewis.

Related concepts, the universal sorter and universal packager refer to similar processes that allow mass nouns to be used as count nouns.

== Universal grinder ==
The idea of the "universal grinder" is that, while count nouns usually denote whole, distinct objects (such as a steak, two steaks), the equivalent mass noun connotes a non-distinct quantity of whatever constitutes these objects (some steak). The universal grinder suggests that most count nouns can be used as mass nouns, when the distinct thing named by the noun will be thought of as a general quantity.

While the "universal grinder" can be used in many Indo-European languages, most particularly English and Dutch, it does not apply in all languages; there is considerable cross-linguistic variation in the morphology and semantics of the mass/count and singular/plural distinctions. For example, bare count nouns in Mandarin Chinese do not receive mass interpretations: a sentence such as Qiáng-shang dōu shì gǒu (墙上都是狗) can only be interpreted as 'There are dogs all over the wall,' not as 'There is dog all over the wall.'

== Universal sorter and packager ==
The "universal sorter" describes one way in which mass nouns are understood when they are used in the plural. Harry Bunt suggested the universal sorter in his 1981 doctoral dissertation. When an ordinarily uncountable noun such as wine appears with plural form (several wines), it can be understood as referring to various abstract kinds (for example, varieties of wine).

The "universal packager" likewise describes how mass nouns are understood when they are used as countable nouns. In this case, the plural noun may be understood as naming individual servings or "packages" (e.g. two coffees may mean "two cups of coffee"), or as naming abstract kinds (two coffees can also refer to e.g. Colombian coffee and Indonesian coffee). Some scholars use the phrase universal packager to refer to both the concrete and abstract understanding of plural nouns; others use it to refer only to the concrete sense, and use universal sorter for abstract meanings.
