= Equational =

Equational may refer to:

- Equative (disambiguation), a construction in linguistics
- something pertaining to equations, in mathematics
- something pertaining to equality, in logic

== See also ==
- Equation (disambiguation)
- Equality (disambiguation)
