= Plurale tantum =

Noun that appears only in the plural form

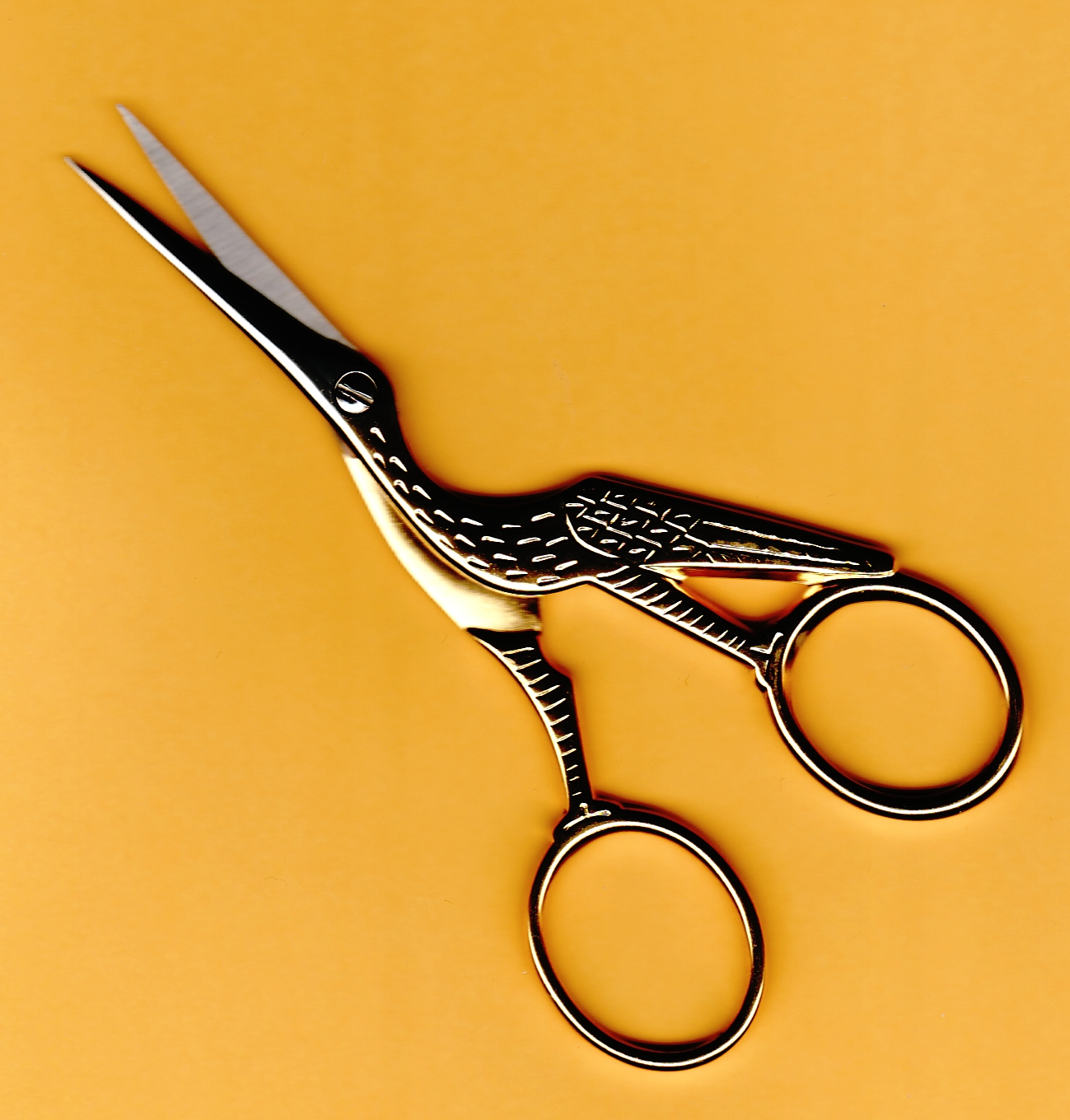
Even a single item is called scissors (the singular form scissor is sometimes used in India).

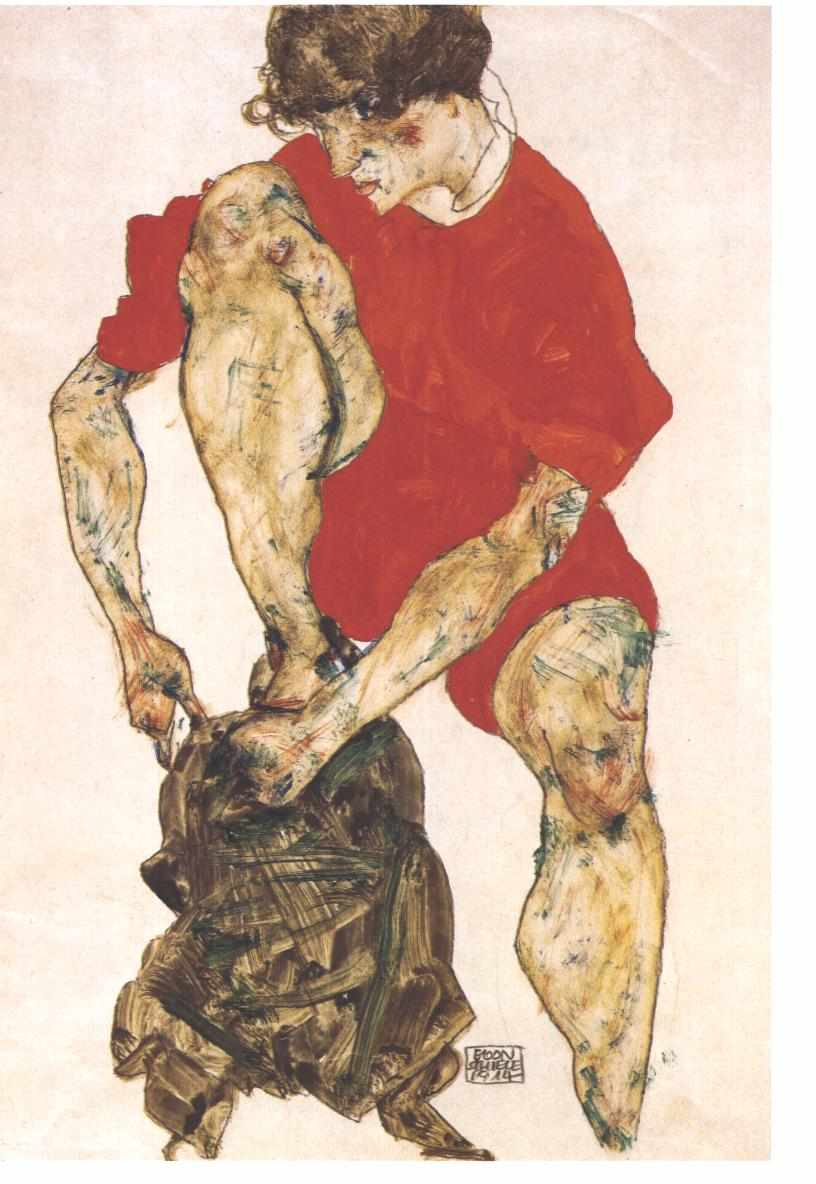
'Putting on pants' is correct, but 'putting on a pant' may sound odd.

A plurale tantum (Latin for 'plural only'; pl. pluralia tantum) is a noun that appears only in the plural form and does not have a singular variant for referring to a single object. In a less strict usage of the term, it can also refer to nouns whose singular form is rarely used.

In English, pluralia tantum are often words that denote objects that occur or function as pairs or sets, such as spectacles, trousers, pants, scissors, clothes, or genitals. Other examples are for collections that, like alms, cannot conceivably be singular. Other examples include suds, jeans, outskirts, odds, riches, goods, news, gallows (although later treated as singular), surroundings, thanks, and heroics.

In some languages, pluralia tantum refer to points or periods of time (for example, Latin kalendae 'calends, the first day of the month', German Ferien 'vacation, holiday'), or to events (for example, Finnish häät 'wedding'), or to liquids (for example, Hebrew מַיִם (mayim) and Chichewa madzí, both 'water').

A bilingual example is the Latin word fasces that was brought into English; when referring to the symbol of authority, it is a plurale tantum noun in both languages.

== English usage ==
In English, some plurale tantum nouns have a singular form used only attributively. Phrases such as "trouser press" and "scissor kick" contain the singular form, but it is considered nonstandard to say "a trouser" or "a scissor" on its own (though in the fashion and tailoring industries use of "trouser" in the singular to refer to a particular style occurs). That accords with the strong preference for singular nouns in attributive positions in English, but some words are used in the plural form even as attributive nouns, such as "clothes peg", "glasses case" – notwithstanding "spectacle case" and "eyeglass case".

In English, a word may have many definitions only some of which are pluralia tantum. The word "glasses" (a set of corrective lenses to improve eyesight) is plurale tantum. In contrast, the word "glass"—either a container for drinks (a count noun) or a vitreous substance (a mass noun)—may be singular or plural. Some words, such as "brain" and "intestine", can be used as either plurale tantum nouns or count nouns.

== Singulare tantum ==
The term for a noun that appears only in the singular form is singulare tantum (pl. singularia tantum), such as the English words: information, dust, and wealth. Singulare tantum is defined by the Shorter Oxford English Dictionary as "Gram. A word having only a singular form; esp. a non-count noun." Such nouns may refer to a unique singular object (essentially a proper noun), but more often than not, they refer to uncountable nouns, either mass nouns (referring to a substance that cannot be counted as distinct objects, such as 'milk') or collective nouns (referring to objects that may in principle be counted but are referred to as one, such as 'popcorn' or Arabic تُوت, tut, 'mulberry'). Given that they do not have a number distinction, they may appear as singulare tantum in one language but as plurale tantum in another. Compare English water to the Hebrew plurale tantum, מַיִם (mayim).

In English, such words are almost always mass nouns. Some uncountable nouns can be alternatively used as count nouns when meaning "a type of", and the plural means "more than one type of". For example, strength is uncountable in Strength is power, but it can be used as a countable noun to mean an instance of [a kind of] strength, as in My strengths are in physics and chemistry. Some words, especially proper nouns such as the name of an individual, are nearly always in the singular form because there is only one example of what that noun means. Others like "nothingness" or "emptiness" refer to logical states of absence that can't sensibly be quantified at all, hence are not usefully "mass nouns" but are still singulare tantum.

== Usage in other languages ==
Pluralia tantum vary arbitrarily between languages. For example, in Swedish, a pair of scissors is just en sax (lit. 'one scissor'), not a plurale tantum. Similarly, in French, a pair of trousers is un pantalon, while in Spanish un pantalón (singular) and unos pantalones (plural) are both valid ways to refer to a single garment. Additionally, in German, the term "Jeans" which is borrowed from English, is rendered singular feminine as die Jeans in accordance with the singular feminine word die Hose meaning "trousers".

In some other languages, rather than quantifying a plurale tantum noun with a measure word, special numeral forms are used in such cases. In Polish, for example, "one pair of eyeglasses" is expressed as either jedne okulary (one-plural glasses-plural) or jedna para okularów (one-singular pair-singular glasses-genitive plural). For larger quantities, "collective numeral" forms are available: troje drzwi (three doors), pięcioro skrzypiec (five violins). Compare them to the ordinary numeral forms found in Polish: trzy filmy/pięć filmów (three films/five films)

The Russian деньги (den'gi, 'money') originally had a singular, деньга (den'ga), which meant a silver coin worth half a kopeck.

The Yiddish word kreplach is a well known example of a plurale tantum that is also plural only in other languages into which it is borrowed, 'one of the kreplach' would be איינער פון די קרעפּלאַך (eyner fun di kreplakh).

The Welsh nefoedd, 'heaven', is the plural of nef, which is no longer part of the spoken language. Nefoedd is now used with the singular meaning of 'heaven' and plural of 'heavens'.

In Hebrew, a few words that indicate an action establishing a new relationship between two persons, are indicated by the plural form only: אירוסין (engagement), נישואין (marriage), קידושין (religious marriage), גירושין (divorce), פיטורין (dismissal), and likewise.

== See also ==
- Classifier (linguistics)
- Defective verb
- English plurals
- Mass noun
- Singulative number
- Synesis
