= Telic =

Telic may refer to:

- Teleology, in metaphysics
- Telicity, in linguistics
- Operation Telic, the codename for British involvement in the Iraq War
