= Fewer versus less =

Grammatical usage debate

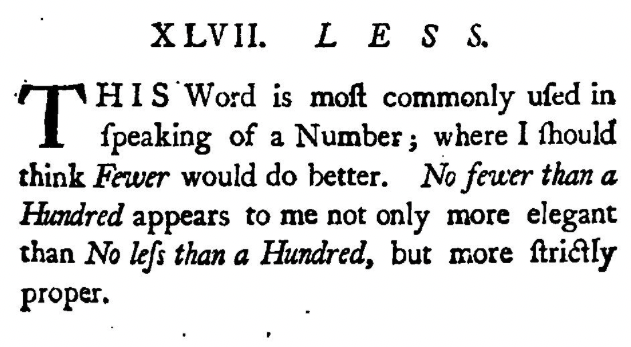
The first known suggestion that fewer should be used in place of less, in Robert Baker's 1770 Remarks on the English Language

Fewer versus less is a debate in English grammar about the appropriate use of these two determiners.

Linguistic prescriptivists usually say that fewer should only be used with plural countable nouns, and that less should be used only with uncountable nouns. This distinction was first tentatively suggested by the grammarian Robert Baker in 1770, and it was eventually presented as a rule by many grammarians since then. (Note: See for example, The Complete Plain Words by Sir Ernest Gowers, revised by Sir Bruce Fraser and issued as a standard text by HMSO to British civil servants.) It can also be found in modern grammar books such as Advanced Grammar in Use as well as dictionaries such as Longman Dictionary of Contemporary English and Oxford Advanced Learner's Dictionary. A similar proposed distinction exists for the words fewest and least.

Linguistic descriptivists describe real (past and current) usage, in which the word less is used with both plural countable nouns and uncountable nouns. While the prescriptive rule for the use of the word fewer is followed in practice, the traditional rule for the use of the word less is often not. As Merriam-Webster's Dictionary of English Usage explains, "Less refers to quantity or amount among things that are measured and to number among things that are counted."

== Current usage ==
The comparative less is used with both countable and uncountable nouns in many discourse environments and dialects of English. In certain discourse environments, however, the use of fewer is preferred. For example, many supermarket checkout line signs read "10 items or less", while others read "10 items or fewer", reflecting the influence of prescriptive grammar on standard language practices. Descriptive grammarians consider this to be a case of hypercorrection as explained in Pocket Fowler's Modern English Usage. In 2008, British supermarket chain Tesco replaced its "10 items or less" notices at checkouts with "up to 10 items" instead of "10 items or fewer" to avoid the controversy surrounding the proposed rule.

A study of online usage seems to suggest that the distinction is not observed by the majority of people (despite copy editing). It has also been noted that certain prescribed constructions are even less likely to see use. For example, it is less common to prefer "At fewest ten items" over "At least ten items" – another potential inconsistency in the proposed rule. Other unnatural examples include "Fewer than half of people", "He won by fewer than five votes", and "Fewer of them came than last time". Additionally, no other determiner besides few has a recognized comparative (-er) or superlative (-est) form, as those suffixes are normally only applied to adjectives, which in the past were not distinguished from determiners.

The Cambridge Guide to English Usage notes that the "pressure to substitute fewer for less seems to have developed out of all proportion to the ambiguity that can be found in certain noun phrases, such as less promising results." It describes conformance with this pressure as a shibboleth and the choice "between the more formal fewer and the more spontaneous less" as a stylistic choice. According to the proposed rule, less would only be used to modify the degree of the adjective, while fewer would be used instead to modify the number of results, despite that no equivalent possible substitution exists for more. Alternative strategies exist to encode such a disambiguation if a speaker wishes, such as to use not as much in place of less and not as many in place of fewer.

aspect	original	comparative	superlative
[number]	few	fewer	fewest
[amount, degree]	little	less	least

=== Exceptions ===
Some prescriptivists prescribe the rule addition that less should be used with units of measurement of time, money, weight, and distance (e.g. "less than 10 dollars" rather than "fewer than 10 dollars", and "less than 3 miles" rather than "fewer than 3 miles").

Some argue that the rare and unidiomatic one fewer should be used instead of one less (both when used alone or together with a singular, discretely quantifiable noun as in "there is one fewer cup on this table"), but Merriam–Webster's Dictionary of English Usage says that "of course [less] follows one".

== Historical usage ==
Less has historically been used in English with countable nouns, but a distinction between the use of fewer and less is first recorded in the 18th century. On this, Merriam–Webster's Dictionary of English Usage notes,

As far as we have been able to discover, the received rule originated in 1770 as a comment on less: "This Word is most commonly used in speaking of a Number; where I should think Fewer would do better. 'No Fewer than a Hundred' appears to me, not only more elegant than 'No less than a Hundred', but more strictly proper." (Robert Baker 1770). Baker's remarks about 'fewer' express clearly and modestly – 'I should think,' 'appears to me' – his own taste and preference....Notice how Baker's preference has been generalized and elevated to an absolute status and his notice of contrary usage has been omitted."

The oldest use that the Oxford English Dictionary gives for less with a countable noun is a quotation from 888 by Alfred the Great:

Swa mid læs worda swa mid ma, swæðer we hit yereccan mayon.

("With less words or with more, whether we may prove it.")

This is in fact an Old English partitive construction using the "quasi-substantive" adverb læs and the genitive worda ("less of words") (cf. plenty of words and *plenty words). When the genitive plural ceased to exist, less of words became less words, and this construction has been used since then until the present.

== See also ==
- Grammatical number
- Mass noun § Words fewer and less
- Count noun
- Preposition stranding controversy
- Quantization (linguistics)
