= Karl-Georg Niebergall =

German logician and philosopher

Karl-Georg Niebergall (born 1961) is a German logician and philosopher and professor for logic and philosophy of language at Humboldt University of Berlin.

== Biography ==
From 1982 Niebergall studied mathematics in Darmstadt. After that he studied logic and philosophy of science under Godehard Link and Matthias Varga von Kibéd at LMU Munich. Niebergall received his PhD in philosophy from LMU in 1995. His PhD dissertation on ‘The metamathematics of non-axiomatized theories’ was awarded with the Stegmüller award of the German Society for Analytic Philosophy. In 1997 Niebergall was a visiting scholar at Stanford University. From 1998 he was associate professor at the department of philosophy at LMU. In 2002 Niebergall received his Habilitation with a dissertation on ‘The foundations of mathematics. Reducibility and ontology’. Since 2008, Niebergall has been professor for logic and philosophy of language at Humboldt University of Berlin.

== Research ==
Niebergall’s research has centered on the metamathematics of formal theories related to mereology and infinity. He has also critically engaged with the works of Nelson Goodman, David Hilbert and William W. Tait.

== Awards ==
- A Stegmüller award of the German Society for Analytic Philosophy (1997) for his doctoral dissertation
