= Collective noun =

Type of noun referring to collections as a unit

A collective noun is a word referring to a collection of things taken as a whole. Most collective nouns in everyday speech are not specific to one kind of thing. For example, the collective noun "group" can be applied to people ("a group of people"), or dogs ("a group of dogs"), or objects ("a group of stones"). Although syntactically the collective noun can be "singular", it's still semantically a collection of entities.

Some collective nouns are specific to one kind of thing, especially terms of venery, which identify groups of specific animals. For example, "pride" as a term of venery always refers to lions, never to dogs or cows. This term of venery describes an attribute of the creature, as do many others, such as a "singular" of boars, manifestly not a term for a collection. (Note: Hodgkin (p.30) quotes Skinner's Etymologicon Linguæ Anglicanæ (1671) "A Synguler, a Boar of above four years old is a SYNGULER, because he leaves his sounder and goes alone.") Other examples come from popular culture such as a group of owls, which is called a "parliament".

Different forms of English handle verb agreement with collective count nouns differently. For example, users of British English generally accept that collective nouns take either singular or plural verb forms depending on context and the metonymic shift that it implies, while in some other forms of English the verb agreement is less flexible.

== Derivation ==
Morphological derivation accounts for many collective words and various languages have common affixes for denoting collective nouns. Because derivation is a slower and less productive word formation process than the more overtly syntactical morphological methods, there are fewer collectives formed this way. As with all derived words, derivational collectives often differ semantically from the original words, acquiring new connotations and even new denotations.

== Affixes ==
=== Proto-Indo-European ===
Early Proto-Indo-European used the suffix *eh₂ to form collective nouns, which evolved into, among others, the Latin neuter plural ending -a, as in "datum/data". Late Proto-Indo-European used the ending *t, which evolved into the English ending -th, as in "young/youth".

=== English ===
The English endings -age and -ade often signify a collective. Sometimes, the relationship is easily recognizable: baggage, drainage, blockade. Though the etymology is plain to see, the derived words take on a distinct meaning. This is a productive ending, as evidenced in the recent coin, "signage".

=== German ===
German uses the prefix ge- to create collectives. The root word often undergoes umlaut and suffixation as well as receiving the ge- prefix. Nearly all nouns created in that way are of neuter gender:

- das Gebirge, "group of hills, mountain range" < der Berg, "mountain" or "hill"
- das Gepäck, "luggage, baggage" < der Pack, "pack, bundle, pile"
- das Geflügel, "poultry, fowl (birds)" < late MHG gevlügel(e), under the influence of der Flügel, "wing" < MHG gevügel < OHG gifugili = collective formation of fogal, "bird"
- das Gefieder, "plumage" < die Feder, "feather"
- das Geschwisterkind, "sibling of another child" or "child of a sibling" < die Schwester, "sister"
- die Geschwister, "siblings" < die Schwester, "sister"
- "Der Gebirgszug" and "die Bergkette" also mean "mountain range", drawing on the words "der Zug" = train, and "die Kette" = chain.

There are also several endings that can be used to create collectives, such as "welt" and "masse".

=== Dutch ===
Dutch has a similar pattern but sometimes uses the (unproductive) circumfix ge- -te:

- berg 'mountain' > gebergte 'mountain range'
- been 'bone' > gebeente 'skeleton'
- vogel 'bird' > gevogelte 'poultry'
- blad 'leaf' > gebladerte 'foliage'

=== Swedish ===
The following Swedish example has different words in the collective form and in the individual form:

- An individual mosquito is a mygga (plural: myggor), but mosquitos as a collective is mygg.

=== Esperanto ===
Esperanto uses the collective infix -ar- to produce a large number of derived words:

- monto 'mountain' > montaro 'mountain range'
- birdo 'bird' > birdaro 'flock'
- arbo 'tree' > arbaro 'forest'
- ŝipo 'ship' > ŝiparo 'fleet'
- manĝilo 'eating utensil' > manĝilaro 'silverware', 'cutlery'

== Metonymic merging of grammatical number ==
Two examples of collective nouns are "team" and "government", which are both words referring to groups of (usually) people. Both "team" and "government" are countable nouns (consider: "one team", "two teams", "most teams"; "one government", "two governments", "many governments").

=== Agreement in different forms of English ===
Confusion often stems from the way that different forms of English handle agreement with collective nouns—specifically, whether or not to use the collective singular: the singular verb form with a collective noun. The plural verb forms are often used in British English with the singular forms of these countable nouns (e.g., "The team have finished the project."). Conversely, in the English language as a whole, singular verb forms can often be used with nouns ending in "-s" that were once considered plural (e.g., "Physics is my favorite academic subject"). This apparent "number mismatch" is a natural and logical feature of human language, and its mechanism is a subtle metonymic shift in the concepts underlying the words.

In British English, it is generally accepted that collective nouns can take either singular or plural verb forms depending on the context and the metonymic shift that it implies. For example, "the team is in the dressing room" (formal agreement) refers to the team as an ensemble, while "the team are fighting among themselves" (notional agreement) refers to the team as individuals. That is also the British English practice with names of countries and cities in sports contexts (e.g., "Newcastle have won the competition.").

In American English, collective nouns almost always take singular verb forms (formal agreement). In cases that a metonymic shift would be revealed nearby, the whole sentence should be recast to avoid the metonymy. (For example, "The team are fighting among themselves" may become "the team members are fighting among themselves" or simply "the team is infighting".) Collective proper nouns are usually taken as singular ("Apple is expected to release a new phone this year"), unless the plural is explicit in the proper noun itself, in which case it is taken as plural ("The Green Bay Packers are scheduled to play the Minnesota Vikings this weekend"). More explicit examples of collective proper nouns include "General Motors is once again the world's largest producer of vehicles", and "Texas Instruments is a large producer of electronics here", and "British Airways is an airline company in Europe". Furthermore, "American Telephone & Telegraph is a telecommunications company in North America". Such phrases might look plural, but they are not.

=== Examples of metonymic shift ===
A good example of such a metonymic shift in the singular-to-plural direction (which is widespread in English outside of North America) is the following sentence: "The team have finished the project." In that sentence, the underlying thought is of the individual members of the team working together to finish the project. Their accomplishment is collective, and the emphasis is not on their individual identities, but they are still discrete individuals; the word choice "team have" manages to convey both their collective and discrete identities simultaneously. Collective nouns that have a singular form but take a plural verb form are called collective plurals. An example of such a metonymic shift in the plural-to-singular direction is the following sentence: "Mathematics is my favorite academic subject". The word "mathematics" may have originally been plural in concept, referring to mathematic endeavors, but metonymic shift (the shift in concept from "the endeavors" to "the whole set of endeavors") produced the usage of "mathematics" as a singular entity taking singular verb forms. (A true mass-noun sense of "mathematics" followed naturally.)

Nominally singular pronouns can be collective nouns taking plural verb forms, according to the same rules that apply to other collective nouns. For example, it is correct usage in both British English and American English usage to say: "None are so fallible as those who are sure they're right." In that case, the plural verb is used because the context for "none" suggests more than one thing or person. This also applies to the use of an adjective as a collective noun: "The British are coming!"; "The poor will always be with you."

Other examples include:

- "Creedence Clearwater Revival was founded in El Cerrito, California" (but in British English, "Creedence Clearwater Revival were founded ...")
- "Arsenal have won the match" (but in American English, "Arsenal has won the game")
- "Nintendo is a video game company headquartered in Japan".

This does not, however, affect the tense later in the sentence:

- "Cream is a psychedelic rock band who were primarily popular in the 1960s.

Abbreviations provide other "exceptions" in American usage concerning plurals:

- "Runs Batted In" becomes "RBIs". "Smith had 10 RBIs in the last three games."
- "Revised Statutes Annotated" or RSAs. "The RSAs contain our laws."

When only the name is plural but not the object, place, or person:

- "The bends is a deadly disease mostly affecting SCUBA divers."
- "Hot Rocks is a greatest hits compilation by The Rolling Stones."

== Terms of venery ==
The tradition of using "terms of venery" or "nouns of assembly", collective nouns that are specific to certain kinds of animals, stems from an English hunting tradition of the Late Middle Ages. The fashion of a consciously developed hunting language came to England from France. It was marked by an extensive proliferation of specialist vocabulary, applying different names to the same feature in different animals. The elements can be shown to have already been part of French and English hunting terminology by the beginning of the 14th century. In the course of the 14th century, it became a courtly fashion to extend the vocabulary, and by the 15th century, the tendency had reached exaggerated and even satirical proportions. Other synonyms for "terms of venery" include "company nouns", "gatherations", and "agminals".

The Treatise, written by Walter of Bibbesworth in the mid-1200s, is the earliest source for collective nouns of animals in any European vernacular (and also the earliest source for animal noises). The Venerie of Twiti (early 14th century) distinguished three types of droppings of animals, and three different terms for herds of animals. Gaston Phoebus (14th century) had five terms for droppings of animals, which were extended to seven in the Master of the Game (early 15th century). The focus on collective terms for groups of animals emerged in the later 15th century. Thus, a list of collective nouns in Egerton MS 1995, dated to c. 1452 under the heading of "termis of venery &c.", extends to 70 items, and the list in the Book of Saint Albans (1486) runs to 164 items, many of which, even though introduced by "the compaynys of beestys and fowlys", relate not to venery, but to human groups and professions and are humorous, such as "a Doctryne of doctoris", "a Sentence of Juges", "a Fightyng of beggers", "an uncredibilite of Cocoldis", "a Melody of harpers", "a Gagle of women", "a Disworship of Scottis", etc.

The Book of Saint Albans became very popular during the 16th century and was reprinted frequently. Gervase Markham edited and commented on the list in his The Gentleman's Academie, in 1595. The book's popularity had the effect of perpetuating many of these terms as part of the Standard English lexicon even if they were originally meant to be humorous and have long ceased to have any practical application.

Even in their original context of medieval venery, the terms were of the nature of kennings, intended as a mark of erudition of the gentlemen able to use them correctly rather than for practical communication. The popularity of the terms in the modern period has resulted in the addition of numerous lighthearted, humorous, or facetious collective nouns.

== See also ==
- Grammatical number
- Hypernym, supertype, umbrella term, blanket term
- List of animal names, including names for groups
- Mass noun
- Measure words
- Plural
- Plurale tantum
- Synesis
