= Quantization (linguistics) =

Concept in formal semantics

In formal semantics, a predicate is quantized if it being true of an entity requires that it is not true of any proper subparts of that entity. For example, if something is an "apple", then no proper subpart of that thing is an "apple". If something is "water", then many of its subparts will also be "water". Hence, the predicate "apple" is quantized, while "water" is not.

Formally, a quantization predicate QUA can be defined as follows, where $U$ is the universe of discourse, $F$ is a variable over sets, and $p$ is a mereological part structure on $U$ with $<_p$ the mereological part-of relation:

$(\forall F\subseteq U_p)(QUA(F) \iff (\forall x,y)(F(x)\wedge F(y) \Rightarrow \neg x<_p y))$

Quantization was first proposed by Manfred Krifka as part of his mereological approach to the semantics of nominals. It has since been applied to other phenomena such as telicity.

== See also ==
- Fewer vs. less
- Mass noun
- Mereology
- Telicity
- Cumulativity (linguistics)
