= Telicity =

Whether a verb presents an action/event as having an endpoint

In linguistics, telicity (/tiːˈlɪsɪti/; from Greek τέλος "end, goal") is the property of a verb or verb phrase that presents an action or event as having a specific endpoint. A verb or verb phrase with this property is said to be telic; if the situation it describes is not heading for any particular endpoint, it is said to be atelic.

== Testing for telicity in English ==
One common way to gauge whether an English verb phrase is telic is to see whether such a phrase as in an hour, in the sense of "within an hour", (known as a time-frame adverbial) can be applied to it. Conversely, a common way to gauge whether the phrase is atelic is to see whether such a phrase as for an hour (a time-span adverbial) can be applied to it.

== Defining the relevant notion of "completeness" ==
=== Having endpoints ===
One often encounters the notion that telic verbs and verb phrases refer to events that have endpoints, and that atelic ones refer to events or states that don't have endpoints. The notion of having endpoints applies to events in the world rather than the expressions that refer to them. This is the most criticized property of this definition. In fact, every event or state in the world begins and ends at some point, except, perhaps, for states that can be described as "the existence of the universe." Certainly, John's being angry has a beginning, and, unless John is somehow eternally angry, it also has an endpoint. Thus, it is doubtful that one can define telic expressions by means of properties of the events or states that they refer to (a very similar problem arises with the notion that mass nouns refer to things that can't be counted). Thus, recent attempts at making the notion explicit focus on the way that telic expressions refer to, or present events or states.

Put differently, one can simply define telic verbs and verb phrases as referring to events conceptualized or presented as having endpoints, and atelic verbs and verb phrases as those conceptualized or presented as lacking endpoints.

This type of exercise can serve as a reminder of the futility of trying to link linguistic semantics to the real world without considering the intermediary agent of human cognition.

=== Tending towards a goal ===
According to Garey (1957), who introduced the term "telic", telic verbs are verbs expressing an action tending towards a goal envisaged as realized in a perfective tense, but as contingent in an imperfective tense; atelic verbs, on the other hand, are verbs which do not involve any goal nor endpoint in their semantic structure, but denote actions that are realized as soon as they begin.

=== Quantization and cumulativity ===
Perhaps the most commonly assumed definition of telicity nowadays is the algebraic definition proposed by Manfred Krifka. Krifka defines telic expressions as ones that are quantized. Atelic ones can be defined in terms of cumulative reference. An expression 'P' can be said to be quantized if and only if it satisfies the following implication, for any choice of events x and y:

If x can be described by 'P', and y can also be described by 'P', then x is not a (mereological) proper part of y.

Suppose, for example, that John built two houses. Then each of the two building events can be described as built a house. But the building of the one house isn't, and indeed cannot be thought of a proper part of the building of the second. This contrasts with states describable as, say, walk around aimlessly. If John walked around aimlessly for two hours, then there will be many proper parts of that, that last, say 10 minutes, or 1 hour, etc. which also can be described as walk around aimlessly. Thus, for walk around aimlessly, there will be many choices of x and y, such that both can be described as walk around aimlessly, where x is a proper part of y. Hence, build a house is correctly characterized as telic and walk around aimlessly as atelic by this definition. Quantization can also be used in the definition of count nouns.

An expression 'P' is said to have cumulative reference if and only if, for any choice of x and y, the following implication holds:

If x can be described as 'P', and y can also be described as 'P', then the mereological sum of x and y can also be described as 'P'.

For example, if there is an event of John walking around from 1pm to 2pm, and another event of his walking around from 2pm to 3pm, then there is, by necessity, a third event which is the sum of the other two, which is also an event of walking around. This doesn't hold for expressions like "built a house." If John built a house from time 1 to time 2, and then he built another house from time 2 to time 3, then the sum of these two events (from time 1 to time 3) is not an event that can be described by "built a house." Cumulativity can also be used in the characterization of mass nouns, and in the characterization of the contrast between prepositions like "to" and "towards," i.e. "towards" has cumulative reference to (sets of) paths, while "to" does not.

== As an aspect ==
Telicity or telic aspect is often included in discussions of grammatical aspect, indicating an event or event predicate is completed. Languages that have telicity-based aspectual systems include Inuktitut, Russian, and German. Languages that contrast telic and atelic actions are Pirahã and Finnic languages such as Finnish and Estonian; Czech and Hungarian also have perfective prefixes pre- and meg-, respectively, which are additionally telic.

In Finnish, the telicity is mandatorily marked on the object: the accusative is telic, and the partitive is used to express atelicity. More accurately, the accusative case is used of objects that are completely affected by the situation as presented by the speaker, whereas using partitive implies that the object is only partially affected in the situation or that the situation is framed so that the object continues to be affected outside it. The terms telic and atelic are not traditionally used in Finnish grammatical description; instead, it is customary to speak of resultative and irresultative sentences.

An example of the contrast between resultative and irresultative in Finnish:

Kirjoitin artikkelin.
wrote-1SG article-ACC
"I wrote the/an article (and finished it)"

Kirjoitin artikkelia.
wrote-1SG article-PTV
"I wrote/was writing the/an article (but did not necessarily finish it)"

The telic sentence necessarily requires finishing the article. In the atelic sentence, it is not expressed whether or not the article is finished. The atelic form expresses ignorance, i.e. atelic is not anti-telic: Kirjoitin artikkelia ja sain sen valmiiksi "I was writing the article-PART and then got it-ACC finished" is correct. What is interpreted as the goal or result is determined by the context, e.g.

- Ammuin karhun – "I shot the bear (succeeded)"; i.e., "I shot the bear dead". ← implicit purpose
- Ammuin karhua – "I shot (towards) the bear"; i.e., "I shot at the bear (but it did not die)".

There are many verbs that correspond to only one telicity due to their inherent meaning. The partitive verbs roughly correspond with atelic verbs in Garey's definition, that is, the action normally does not have a result or goal, and it would be logically and grammatically incorrect to place them in the telic aspect. However, even inherently atelic verbs such as rakastaa "to love" can in semantically unusual constructions, where a kind of result is involved, become telic:

Hän rakastaa minua.
(s)he love-3SG me-PTV
"(s)he loves me"

Hän rakastaa minut kuoliaaksi.
(s)he love-3SG me-ACC dead-TRANSL
"(s)he loves me to death"

Also, many other stative verbs that are in terms of their meaning inherently atelic, mark their objects in the accusative case, which is the normal case for telic situations:

Tiedän Pekan osoitteen.
know-1SG Pekka-GEN address-ACC
"I know Pekka's address" (not *Tiedän Pekan osoitetta ... address-PART)

Muistan sinun kasvosi.
remember-1SG you-GEN face-PL.ACC.2SG_POSS
"I remember your face" (not *Muistan sinun kasvojasi ... face-PL.PART-2SG_POSS)

Furthermore, the telicity contrast can act as case government, so that changing the case can change the meaning entirely. For example, näin hänet (I saw him-ACC) means "I saw him", but näin häntä (I saw him-PART) means "I met him (occasionally, sometimes, every now and then)". This is often highly irregular.

The use of a telic object may implicitly communicate that the action takes place in the future. For example,

- Luen kirjan. "I will read the book"; the action can only be complete in the future.
- Luen kirjaa. "I am reading a book" or "I will be reading a book"; no indication is given for the time.

Telicity is often conflated with the similar concept of perfectivity, though the two are distinct. Telicity is a property of an event or event predicate - a telic event has a logical point of completion, while an atelic event does not. Perfectivity, on the other hand, refers to whether an event is seen as a single whole or as having internal structure. Under a mereological, event-based semantic theory, telic predicates are only logically compatible with perfective interpretation, and therefore the default interpretation of telic predicates is perfective. (It is likely that the confusion between telic and perfective stems from this entailment.) On the other hand, atelic predicates are logically compatible with both imperfective and perfective aspects, and the default interpretation of imperfective follows from Grice's second maxim of Quantity - essentially, any conversational contribution should be as informative as required but no more informative than necessary. The idea behind invoking Grice's second maxim is that (in languages which make grammatical distinctions between perfective and imperfective aspect) an atelic verb would have an additional marker of perfectivity, meaning that an atelic verb with no additional marker ought to get an imperfective interpretation.
