= EQN =

EQN may refer to:

- Eqn., a mathematical abbreviation for the word "equation"
- eqn (software), an equation typesetting program
- Equiniti, a British outsourcing business
- EverQuest Next, a cancelled video game

== See also ==
- Equation (disambiguation)
