= Equative =

Equative may refer to:

- equative case, a grammatical case
- equative construction, a grammatical construction using an adjective or an adverb in the comparative of equality
- equative degree, another name for the comparative of equality
- equative sentence, a sentence where two entities are equated with each other
