= Partitive case =

Grammatical case denoting "partialness", "without result" or "without specific identity"

The partitive case (abbreviated PTV, PRTV, or more ambiguously PART) is a grammatical case which denotes "partialness", "without result", or "without specific identity". It is also used in contexts where a subgroup is selected from a larger group, or with numbers.

== Finnic languages ==
In Finnic languages, such as Finnish and Estonian, this case is often used to express unknown identities and irresultative actions. For example, in Finnish, it is found in the following circumstances, with the characteristic ending of -a or -ta:

- After numbers, in singular: "kolme taloa" → "three houses" (cf. plural, where both are used, e.g. sadat kirjat "the hundreds of books", sata kirjaa "hundred books" as an irresultative object.)
- For atelic actions (possibly incomplete) and ongoing processes: "luen kirjaa" → "I'm reading a book"
  - Compare with telic actions in accusative case: "luen kirjan" → "I will read the (entire) book"
- With atelic verbs, particularly those indicating emotions: "rakastan tätä taloa" → "I love this house"
- For tentative inquiries: "saanko lainata kirjaa?" → "can I borrow the book?"
- For uncountables: "lasissa on maitoa" → "there is (some) milk in the glass"
- Compositions: "pala juustoa" → "a piece of cheese"
- In places where English would use "some" or "any": "onko teillä kirjoja?" → "do you have any books?"
  - Compare with nominative case: "onko teillä kirjat?" → "do you have the (specific) books?"
- For negative statements: "talossa ei ole kirjaa" → "in the house, [there] is not [a] book"
- Comparisons
  - Without "kuin" ("than"): "saamista parempaa on antaminen" → "what is better than receiving is giving"
  - The more common form "antaminen on parempaa kuin saaminen" "giving is better than receiving" places only the comparative adverb in the partitive.

Where not mentioned, the accusative case would be ungrammatical. For example, the partitive must always be used after singular numerals.

As an example of the irresultative meaning of the partitive, ammuin karhun (accusative) means "I shot the bear (dead)", whereas ammuin karhua (partitive) means "I shot (at) the bear" without specifying if it was even hit. Notice that Finnish has no native future tense, so that the partitive provides an important reference to the present as opposed to the future. Thus luen kirjaa means "I am reading a/the book" whereas luen kirjan means "I will read a/the book". Thus "luen" can mean "I read", "I am reading" or "I will read" depending on the case form of the word that follows. The partitive form kirjaa indicates incompleted action and hence the meaning of the verb form is present tense. The accusative form kirjan indicates completed action when used with the past tense verb but indicates planned future action when used with a verb in the present tense. Hence luen kirjan means "I will read the book".

The case with an unspecified identity is onko teillä kirjoja, which uses the partitive, because it refers to unspecified books, as contrasted to nominative onko teillä (ne) kirjat?, which means "do you have (those) books?"

The partitive case comes from the older ablative case. This meaning is preserved e.g. in kotoa (from home), takaa (from behind), where it means "from".

A Western Finnish dialectal phenomenon seen in some dialects is the assimilation of the final -a into a preceding vowel, thus making the chroneme the partitive marker. For example, suurii → suuria "some big --".

In Estonian, the system is generally similar. In Estonian grammatical tradition, the term "accusative" is not used, since like in Finnish, the total object form coincides with the genitive in the singular, and the nominative in the plural.

In many Estonian words, the difference between the full and partial object cases is only in vowel or consonant quantity (long vs overlong), which is not marked in writing, except for stop consonants. Thus, the distinction between a total and partial object may be apparent in speech but not in writing. For example, the sentence Linn ehitab kooli would mean "The city will build a/the school" when pronounced with a long vowel "o" in kooli "school (genitive case)", and "The city is building a/the school" with an overlong "o" (partitive case).

For many verbs in Estonian, an additional adverb is almost always added when a completed action is meant - for example, ma söön leiba "I'm eating bread", vs ma söön leiva ära "I will eat the (whole) bread". Since Estonian, unlike Finnish, has words where the genitive and partitive singular are identical even in pronunciation, this can provide disambiguation in those cases - e.g ma söön kala "I'm eating fish", vs ma söön kala ära "I will eat (all of) the fish".

== Sámi ==
Of the Sámi languages, Inari and Skolt Sámi still have a partitive, although it is slowly disappearing and its function is being taken over by other cases.

=== Skolt Sámi ===
The partitive is used only in the singular and can always be replaced by the genitive. The partitive marker is -d.

1. It appears after numbers larger than 6:
  kääuʹc čâustõkkâd: eight lassos
  This can be replaced with kääʹuc čâustõõǥǥ.
2. It is also used with certain postpositions:
  kuäʹtted vuâstta: against a kota
  This can be replaced with kuäʹđ vuâstta.
3. It can be used with the comparative to express that which is being compared:
  Kåʹlled pueʹrab : better than gold
  This would nowadays more than likely be replaced by pueʹrab ko kåʹll

== Dutch ==
In Dutch there are many adjectives ending in -s, which is called the partitive case. This case is derived from the genitive case in the older declension system and is used after words that signify quantity, such as the Dutch veel, weinig or niets (respectively meaning many/much/a lot, few/little or nothing):

Dat is niets nieuws.
That's nothing new.
Men verwacht er veel goeds van.
People expect a lot from it.

The partitive case can also be used as a comparative:

Heb je niets beters?
Don't you have anything better?

If an adjective already ends in an alveolar fricative (like s in "suit"), the "-s" drops:

Geef mij maar iets fris.
Give me something fresh.
Dat is iets fantastisch!
That is something fantastic!

== Russian ==
The Russian language usually uses the genitive case to express partialness. However, some Russian mass nouns have developed a distinct partitive case, also referred to as the "second genitive case". The partitive arose from the merger of the declensions of *-ŏ and *-ŭ stem nouns in Old East Slavic, which left the former *-ŭ stem genitive suffix available for a specialized use.

In modern Russian, use of the partitive case is often facultative. In many situations, the partitive and the genitive can be used almost synonymously: чашка чаю, cháshka cháyu (partitive) and чашка чая cháshka cháya (genitive) both mean "a cup of tea"; много дыму, mnógo dýmu (partitive) and много дыма mnógo dýma (genitive) both mean "lots of smoke". The partitive variant is preferred with verbs: выпить чаю, výpit' cháyu, "to have a drink of tea". The genitive variant is used more frequently when the mass noun is modified by an adjective: чашка горячего чая cháshka goryáchevo cháya, "a cup of hot tea".
