= Theoretical Linguistics (journal) =

- Discipline: Theoretical linguistics
- Language: English
- Edited by: Manfred Krifka

Publication details
- History: 1975–present
- Publisher: Mouton de Gruyter (Germany)
- Frequency: Triannual
- Impact factor: 1.929 (2020)

Standard abbreviations
- ISO 4: Theor. Linguist.

Indexing
- ISSN: 0301-4428 (print); 1613-4060 (web)

Links
- Journal homepage

Theoretical Linguistics is an international peer-reviewed journal of theoretical linguistics published by Mouton de Gruyter. Since 2001, Manfred Krifka (Humboldt University of Berlin) has been its editor.

In 2020, the journal's impact factor was 1.929, as reported by Journal Citation Reports.

The journal publishes four issues per year. Each issue contains one main article, and a number of shorter responses to that article.
