= Equative construction =

An equative construction is a grammatical construction using an adjective or an adverb in the comparative of equality (also called "equative degree"). An equative construction equates a comparee with a standard in terms of a certain quality or action. In English, such a construction takes the form “as X as S”, where S is the standard.

In modern French, the equative construction takes the form “aussi X que S”.

Welsh has an equative degree of adjectives, usually indicated by the suffix -ed; for example, "hyned" (â ...)", meaning "as old (as ...)".
