= Measure word =

Words that measure quantities

In linguistics, measure words are words (or morphemes) that are used in combination with a numeral to indicate an amount of something represented by some noun. Many languages use measure words, and East Asian languages such as Chinese, Japanese, and Korean use them extensively in the form of number classifiers.

== Description ==
Measure words denote a unit of measurement and are used with mass nouns (uncountable nouns), and in some cases also with count nouns. For instance, in English, mud is a mass noun and thus one cannot say "three muds", but one can say "three drops of mud", "three pails of mud", etc. In these examples, drops and pails function as measure words. One can also say "three pails of shells"; in this case the measure word pails accompanies a count noun (shells).

The term measure word is also sometimes used to refer to numeral classifiers, which are used with count nouns in some languages. For instance, in English no extra word is needed when saying "three people", but in many East Asian languages a numeral classifier is added, just as a measure word is added for uncountable nouns in English. For example:

一 只 狗
一 隻 狗
yī zhī gǒu
one [measure-word] dog
'one dog'

三 只 狗
三 隻 狗
sān zhī gǒu
three [measure-word] dog
'three dogs'

There are numerous Chinese measure words, and nouns differ in what measure words they can use. While many linguists maintain a distinction between measure words and numeral classifiers, the terms are sometimes used interchangeably. For instance, materials for teaching Chinese as a second language generally refer to Chinese classifiers as "measure words". The corresponding Chinese term is liàngcí (simplified Chinese: 量词; traditional Chinese: 量詞), which can be directly translated as "quantity word".

Most measure words in English correspond to units of measurement or containers, and are themselves count nouns rather than grammatical particles:

- one quart of water
- three cups of coffee
- four kernels of corn, three ears of corn, two bushels of corn

Though similar in construction, fractions are not measure words. For example, in "seven-eighths of an apple" the fraction acts as a noun. Compare that to "seven slices of apple" where "apple" is a mass noun and does not require the article "an". Combining the two, e.g. "seven-eighths of a slice of apple", makes it clear the fraction must be a noun referring to a part of another countable noun.

In many languages, including the East Asian languages referred to above, the analogous constructions do not include any equivalent of the English of. In German, for example, ein Glas Bier means "a glass [of] beer". This is interesting since both languages are West Germanic languages, making them closely related to each other. However, the equivalent of the English of is common in Romance languages such as "a glass of beer":

Spanish: un vaso de cerveza
French: un verre de bière
Portuguese: um copo de cerveja

== Classifiers versus measure words ==
Classifiers play a similar role to measure words, except that measure words denote a particular quantity of something (a drop, a cupful, a pint, etc.), rather than the inherent countable units associated with a count noun. Classifiers are used with count nouns; measure words can be used with mass nouns (e.g. "two pints of mud"), and can also be used when a count noun's quantity is not described in terms of its inherent countable units (e.g. "two pints of acorns").

However, the terminological distinction between classifiers and measure words is often blurred – classifiers are commonly referred to as measure words in some contexts, such as Chinese language teaching, and measure words are sometimes called mass-classifiers or similar.

== See also ==
- Collective noun
- Count noun
- List of collective nouns
