= Equation (disambiguation) =

An equation in mathematics is a formula stating that two expressions have the same value.

Equation may also refer to:

- Chemical equation, a symbolic representation of a chemical reaction
- Equation of time, the difference between solar time, as shown by a sundial, and mean time, as shown by a clock that runs at constant speed
  - Equation clock, a clock that contains a mechanism that embodies the equation of time, so the clock shows solar time
- Equation of state, a relationship between physical conditions and the state of a material
- Equation (band), an English folk band formed in 1996
- Equation Group, a computer espionage group
- "The Equation", a 2008 episode of Fringe
- "[Equation]" (ΔM_{i}^{−1} = −αΣ_{n=1}^{N}D_{i}[n] [Σ_{j∈C[i]}F_{ji}[n − 1] + Fext_{i}[n^{−1}]]), the first B-side of "Windowlicker" by Aphex Twin, also known as "[Formula]"

== See also ==
- List of equations
