= Cumulativity =

Linguistic semantics concept

In linguistic semantics, an expression X is said to have cumulative reference if and only if the following holds: If X is true of both of a and b, then it is also true of the combination of a and b. For example, the English word "water" has cumulative reference, since if two separate entities can be said to be "water", then combining them into one entity will yield more "water". On the other hand, two separate entities which each are "a house" do not combine to form "a house". Hence, the expression "a house" does not have cumulative reference. The plural form "houses", however, does have cumulative reference. If two (groups of) entities are both "houses", then their combination will still be "houses".

Cumulativity has proven relevant to the linguistic treatment of the mass/count distinction and for the characterization of grammatical telicity.

Formally, a cumulative predicate CUM can be defined as follows, where capital X is a variable over sets, U is the universe of discourse, p is a mereological part structure on U, and $\oplus_p$ is the mereological sum operation.

$$(\forall X\subseteq U_p)(CUM(X)\iff \exists x,y(X(x) \wedge X(y) \wedge x\neq y) \wedge \forall x,y(X(x) \wedge X(y) \Rightarrow X(x \oplus_p y)))$$

In later work, Krifka has generalized the notion to n-ary predicates, based on the phenomenon of cumulative quantification. For example, the two following sentences appear to be equivalent:

John ate an apple and Mary ate a pear.
John and Mary both ate both a pear and an apple.

This shows that the relation "eat" is cumulative. In general, an n-ary predicate R is cumulative if and only if the following holds:

$$(\forall x_1,\ldots, x_n, y_1,\ldots, y_n)(R(x_1, \ldots,x_n)\wedge R(y_1, \ldots,y_n)) \rightarrow R(x_1\oplus y_1, \ldots,x_n\oplus y_n)$$
