= Count noun =

Noun or noun phrase whose quantity is discrete and usually an integer

In linguistics, a count noun (also countable noun) is a noun that can be modified by a quantity and that occurs in both singular and plural forms, and that can co-occur with quantificational determiners like every, each, several, etc. A mass noun has none of these properties: It cannot be modified by a number, cannot occur in plural, and cannot co-occur with quantificational determiners.

== Grammatical distinction ==
The concept of a "mass noun" is a grammatical concept and is not based on the innate nature of the object to which that noun refers. For example, "seven chairs" and "some furniture" could refer to exactly the same objects, with "seven chairs" referring to them as a collection of individual objects but with "some furniture" referring to them as a single undifferentiated unit, without reference to quantity. Because of this, the choice can serve a semantic purpose. However, some abstract phenomena like "fun" and "hope" have properties that are very difficult to quantify, and thus make it very difficult to refer to them with a count noun.

Below are examples of all the properties of count nouns holding for the count noun chair, but not for the mass noun furniture.

Occurrence in plural
Correct	Incorrect
There is a chair in the room.	There is chair in the room.
There are chairs in the room.	There are furnitures in the room.
There is furniture in the room.	There is a furniture in the room.

Some determiners can be used with both mass and count nouns, including "all", "no", and "some". Others cannot: "few", "many", "those", and numbers ("one") are used with count nouns; "little" and "much" with mass nouns. According to a controversial prescription, "fewer" and "fewest" is reserved for count nouns and "less" and "least" for mass nouns (see Fewer vs. less), but "less" has always been commonly used for count nouns. Despite this, "more" is uncontroversially the proper comparative for both "many" and "much". This criticism only dates back to 1770, but the criticized usage dates back to Old English.

Co-occurrence with count determiners
Correct	Incorrect
Every chair is man-made.	Every furniture is man-made.
There are several chairs in the room.	There are several furnitures in the room.

Classifiers are sometimes used as count nouns preceding mass nouns, in order to redirect the speaker's focus away from the mass nature. For example, "There's some furniture in the room" can be restated, with a change of focus, to "There are some pieces of furniture in the room"; and "let's have some fun" can be refocused as "Let's have a bit of fun". In English, some nouns are used frequently as both count nouns (with or without a classifier) and mass nouns. For example:

- "I'll have a cup of coffee." (count noun with classifier)
- "I'll have two coffees." (count noun without classifier)
- "I'll have coffee." (plain mass noun)
- "I'll have some coffee." (mass noun with determiner)
- "I'll have too much coffee." (mass noun with modified determiner)

== Theory ==
Logicians Godehard Link and linguists like Manfred Krifka investigated the mass noun and count noun distinction and found that it can be given a precise mathematical definition in terms of notions like cumulativity and quantization. Discussed by Barry Schein in 1993, a new logical framework, called plural logic, has also been used for characterizing the semantics of count nouns and mass nouns.

== Linguistic differences ==
Some languages, such as Mandarin Chinese, treat all nouns as mass nouns, and need to make use of a noun classifier (see Chinese classifier) to add numerals and other quantifiers. The following examples are of nouns which, while seemingly innately countable, are still treated as mass nouns:

- 那个人吃完了/那個人吃完了 (nà gè rén chī wán le) – "That unit (of) person has eaten", "That person has eaten"
- 那三个人吃完了/那三個人吃完了 (nà sān gè rén chī wán le) – "Those three unit (of) person have eaten", "Those three people have eaten"
- 她有七本书/她有七本書 (tā yǒu qī běn shū) – "She has seven volume (of) book", "She has seven books."

A classifier, therefore, implies that the object(s) referred to are countable in the sense that the speaker intends them to be enumerated, rather than considered as a unit (regardless of quantity). Notice that the classifier changes as the unit being counted changes.

Words such as "milk" or "rice" are not so obviously countable entities, but they can be counted with an appropriate unit of measure in both English and Mandarin (e.g., "glasses of milk" or "spoonfuls of rice").

The use of a classifier is similar to, but not identical with, the use of units of measurement to count groups of objects in English. For example, in "three shelves of books", where "shelves" is used as a unit of measurement.

On the other hand, some languages, like Turkish, treat all the nouns (even things which are not obviously countable) as countable nouns.

- Pirinçler daha tam pişmemiş. – "The rice (lit. rices) hasn't been cooked well yet"
- Sütler hep yerlere döküldü. – "The milk (lit. milks) has been spilled all over the floor (lit. floors)"
- Nehirlerin suları çok güzel akıyor. – "The rivers' water (lit. waters) flows very nicely"
- Parasız kişiler için kitaplar dağıtıyorlar. – "They are distributing books for the people without money"

Even then, it is possible to use units of measures with numbers in Turkish, even with the very obviously countable nouns. The Turkish nouns can not take a plural suffix after the numbers and the units of measure.

- Beş bardak süt – "five glasses of milk"
- İki kaşık dolusu pirinç – "two spoonfuls of rice"
- Üç tane kişi – "three units of person"
- Dört metrekare yer – "Four square meters of floor"
- Yedi raf kitap – "seven shelves of book"

== See also ==
- Collective noun
- Grammatical number
- Indefinite article
- Mass noun
- Measure word
