= Mass noun =

Noun whose quantity is treated as an undifferentiated unit

In linguistics, a mass noun, uncountable noun, non-count noun, uncount noun, or just uncountable, is a noun with the syntactic property that any part and quantity of it is treated as an undifferentiated unit, rather than as something with discrete elements. Uncountable nouns are distinguished from count nouns.

Given that different languages have different grammatical features, the actual test for which nouns are mass nouns may vary between languages. In English, mass nouns are characterized by the impossibility of being directly modified by a numeral without specifying a unit of measurement and by the impossibility of being combined with an indefinite article (a or an). Thus, the mass noun "water" is quantified as "20 litres of water" while the count noun "chair" is quantified as "20 chairs". However, both mass and count nouns can be quantified in relative terms without unit specification (e.g., "so much water", "so many chairs", though with different quantifiers "much" and "many").

Mass nouns have no concept of singular and plural, although in English they take singular verb forms. However, many mass nouns in English can be converted to count nouns, which can then be used in the plural to denote (for instance) more than one instance or variety of a certain sort of entity – for example, "Many cleaning agents today are technically not soaps [i.e. types of soap], but detergents," or "I drank about three beers [i.e. bottles or glasses of beer]".

Some nouns can be used indifferently as mass or count nouns, e.g., three cabbages or three heads of cabbage; three ropes or three lengths of rope. Some have different senses as mass and count nouns: paper is a mass noun as a material (three reams of paper, one sheet of paper), but a count noun as a unit of writing ("the students passed in their papers").

== Grammatical number and physical discreteness ==
In English (and in many other languages), there is a tendency for nouns referring to liquids (water, juice), powders (sugar, sand), or substances (metal, wood) to be used in mass syntax, and for nouns referring to objects or people to be count nouns. But there are many exceptions: the mass/count distinction is a property of the terms, not their referents. For example, the same set of chairs can be referred to as "seven chairs" (count) and as "furniture" (mass); the Middle English mass noun pease has become the count noun pea by morphological reanalysis; "vegetables" are a plural count form, while the British English slang synonym "veg" is a mass noun.

In languages that have a partitive case, the distinction is explicit and mandatory. For example, in Finnish, join vettä, "I drank (some) water", the word vesi, "water", is in the partitive case. The related sentence join veden, "I drank (the) water", using the accusative case instead, assumes that there was a specific countable portion of water that was completely drunk.

The work of logicians like Godehard Link and Manfred Krifka established that the mass/count distinction can be given a precise, mathematical definition in terms of quantization and cumulativity.

== Cumulativity and mass nouns ==
An expression P has cumulative reference if and only if for any X and Y:

- If X can be described as P and Y can be described as P, as well, then the sum of X and Y can also be described as P.

In more formal terms (Krifka 1998):

$$\forall X \subseteq U_p [\mathrm{CUM}_p (X) \Leftrightarrow \exists x,y [ X(x) \,\wedge\,  X(y) \,\wedge\, \neg (x=y)] \;\wedge\; \forall x,y [X(x) \,\wedge\, X(y) \Rightarrow X(x \,\oplus\, y)]]$$

which may be read as: X is cumulative if there exists at least one pair x,y, where x and y are distinct, and both have the property X, and if for all possible pairs x and y fitting that description, X is a property of the sum of x and y.

Consider, for example, cutlery: If one collection of cutlery is combined with another, there is still "cutlery". Similarly, if water is added to water, there is still "water". But if a chair is added to another, there is not "a chair", but rather two chairs. Thus the nouns "cutlery" and "water" have cumulative reference, while the expression "a chair" does not. The expression "chairs", however, does, suggesting that the generalization is not actually specific to the mass-count distinction. As many have noted, it is possible to provide an alternative analysis, by which mass nouns and plural count nouns are assigned a similar semantics, as distinct from that of singular count nouns.

An expression P has quantized reference if and only if, for any X:

- If X can be described as P, then no proper part of X can be described as P.

This can be seen to hold in the case of the noun house: no proper part of a house, for example the bathroom, or the entrance door, is itself a house. Similarly, no proper part of a man, say his index finger, or his knee, can be described as a man. Hence, house and man have quantized reference. However, collections of cutlery do have proper parts that can themselves be described as cutlery. Hence cutlery does not have quantized reference. Notice again that this is probably not a fact about mass-count syntax, but about prototypical examples, since many singular count nouns have referents whose proper parts can be described by the same term. Examples include divisible count nouns like "rope", "string", "stone", "tile", etc.

Some expressions are neither quantized nor cumulative. Examples of this include collective nouns like committee. A committee may well contain a proper part which is itself a committee. Hence this expression is not quantized. It is not cumulative, either: the sum of two separate committees is not necessarily a committee. In terms of the mass/count distinction, committee behaves like a count noun. By some accounts, these examples are taken to indicate that the best characterization of mass nouns is that they are cumulative nouns. On such accounts, count nouns should then be characterized as non-cumulative nouns: this characterization correctly groups committee together with the count nouns. If, instead, the choice was made to characterize count nouns as quantized nouns, and mass nouns as non-quantized ones, then one would (incorrectly) be led to expect committee to be a mass noun. However, as noted above, such a characterization fails to explain many central phenomena of the mass-count distinction.

== Multiple senses for one noun ==
Many English nouns can be used in either mass or count syntax, and in these cases, they take on cumulative reference when used as mass nouns. For example, one may say that "there's apple in this sauce", and then apple has cumulative reference, and, hence, is used as a mass noun. The names of animals, such as "chicken", "fox" or "lamb" are count when referring to the animals themselves, but are mass when referring to their meat, fur, or other substances produced by them (e.g., "I'm cooking chicken tonight" or "This coat is made of fox"). Conversely, "fire" is frequently used as a mass noun, but "a fire" refers to a discrete entity. Substance terms like "water" which are frequently used as mass nouns, can be used as count nouns to denote arbitrary units of a substance ("Two waters, please") or of several types/varieties ("waters of the world").

- "I'll have a cup of coffee" (count noun with classifier)
- "I'll have two coffees" (count noun without classifier)
- "I'll have coffee" (plain mass noun)
- "I'll have some coffee" (mass noun with determiner)
- "I've had too much coffee" (mass noun with modified determiner)

One may say that mass nouns that are used as count nouns are "countified" and that count ones that are used as mass nouns are "massified". However, this may confuse syntax and semantics, by presupposing that words which denote substances are mass nouns by default. It has been suggested nouns do not have a lexical specification for mass-count status, and instead are specified as such only when used in a sentence.

Nouns differ in the extent to which they can be used flexibly, depending largely on their meanings and the context of use. For example, the count noun "house" is difficult to use as mass (though clearly possible), and the mass noun "cutlery" is most frequently used as mass, despite the fact that it denotes objects, and has count equivalents in other languages:

- "There is house on the road." (Incorrect and unusual, even if referring to, for example, the houses left after a catastrophe has taken place.)
- "There is a cutlery on the table." (Incorrect even if just one fork is thereon.)
- "You got a lot of house for your money since the recession."
- "Spanish cutlery is my favorite." (Here referring to type or kind.)

Regarding languages without a morphological plural, such as Chinese and Japanese, some claim that all nouns are effectively mass nouns, requiring a measure word in order to be quantified.

== Quantification ==
Some quantifiers can be used with both mass nouns and count nouns, including all, no, and some. Others cannot: few, many, those, and numbers (one) are used with count nouns; little and much with mass nouns. This also applies to phrasal quantifiers. For example, an amount of is for mass nouns, a number of is for count nouns, and a lot of can be used with both types.

Occurrence of determiners
Correct	Incorrect
How much damage? Very little.	How much damage? Very few.
How many votes? Very few.	How many votes? Very little.

Whereas more and most are uncontroversially the comparative and superlative of both much and many, a controversial prescription is for few and little to have differing comparative and superlative forms (fewer, fewest and less, least), but use of less and least with count nouns has always been common (see Fewer versus less). This criticism only dates back to 1770, but the criticized usage dates back to Old English.

== Conflation of collective noun and mass noun ==
There is often confusion about the two different concepts of collective noun and mass noun. Generally, collective nouns such as group, family, and committee are not mass nouns but are rather a special subset of count nouns. However, the term "collective noun" is often used to mean "mass noun" (even in some dictionaries) because users conflate two different kinds of verb number invariability: (a) that seen with mass nouns such as "water" or "furniture", with which only singular verb forms are used because the constituent matter is grammatically indivisible (although it may ["water"] or may not ["furniture"] be etically indivisible); and (b) that seen with collective nouns, which is the result of the metonymical shift between the group and its (both grammatically and etically) discrete constituents.

Some words, including "mathematics" and "physics", have developed true mass-noun senses despite having grown from count-noun roots.

== See also ==
- Plurale tantum – Noun that appears only in the plural form
