= Manfred Krifka =

German linguist

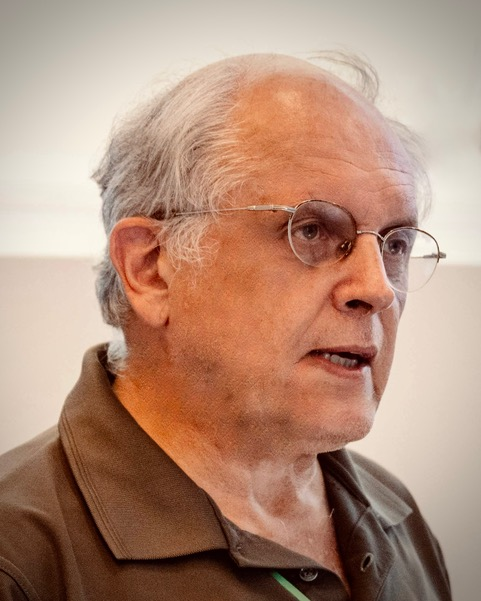
- Krifka in 2023
- Born: 26 April 1956 (age 70); Dachau, Bavaria, Germany
- Education: LMU Munich
- Occupation: Linguist
- Spouse: Zuzana Krifka Dobes (died 2022)
- Children: 2 daughters, Lydia and Theresa

Manfred Krifka (born 26 April 1956 in Dachau) is a German linguist. He was the director of the Leibniz Centre for General Linguistics (Leibniz-Zentrum Allgemeine Sprachwissenschaft, ZAS) in Berlin, and professor of general linguistics at the Humboldt University of Berlin. He was editor of the academic journal Linguistics and Philosophy from 1999 to 2023 and has been editor of Theoretical Linguistics since 2001.

== Career and education ==
Krifka graduated from LMU Munich in 1986 in Theoretical Linguistics, Philosophy and Theory of Science, and Psycholinguistics. He subsequently held positions at the University of Tübingen from 1986 to 1989, at the University of Texas at Austin from 1990 to 2000, and at Humboldt University of Berlin from 2000 to 2022. From 2001 to November 2022, he was the director of the Zentrum Allgemeine Sprachwissenschaft (Centre for General Linguistics, known since 2017 as the Leibniz-Zentrum Allgemeine Sprachwissenschaft); since 2023 he has been Senior Fellow at ZAS.

== Work ==
Krifka's main areas of research are linguistic semantics, pragmatics, language typology and Melanesian languages, especially languages of Ambrym, in particular Daakie, or Port Vato language, and the Creole language Bislama. He has done substantial work on the meaning of nouns, in particular mass nouns and count nouns, on grammatical aspect, generic sentences, polarity items and negation, quantification and vagueness, information structure, anaphora, discourse, questions, response particles and speech acts.

== Awards and distinctions ==
Krifka was a Fellow at the Center for Advanced Study in the Behavioral Sciences 1995-1996 and of the Israel Institute for Advanced Studies in 1997. He received the Meyer-Struckmann Prize for Humanities and Social Sciences for his work on language and cognition in 2021, an Honorary Membership of the Linguistic Society of America in 2023 and the Wilhelm von Humboldt Prize of the German Society of Linguistics (Deutsche Gesellschaft für Sprachwissenschaft, DGfS) in 2024.

== Bibliography ==
- Krifka, Manfred (1998). "The Origins of Telicity". Pages 197–235 in S. Rothstein (ed.). Events and grammar. Dordrecht: Kluwer Academic Press.
