= Godehard Link =

German philosopher

Godehard Link (born 7 July 1944 in Lippstadt) is a professor of logic and philosophy of science (now emeritus) at LMU Munich. He was one of the organizers of an international conference marking the 100th anniversary of Bertrand Russell's discovery of Russell's Paradox, and the editor of the conference proceedings volume.

== Bibliography ==
- Godehard Link, ed., "One Hundred Year o Russell's Paradox," (2004) de Gruyter
