= Degrees of comparison of adjectives and adverbs =

Feature in the morphology or syntax of some languages

The degrees of comparison of adjectives and adverbs are the various forms taken by adjectives and adverbs when used to compare two or more entities (comparative degree), three or more entities (superlative degree), or when not comparing entities (positive degree) in terms of a certain property or way of doing something.

The usual degrees of comparison are the positive, which denotes a certain property or a certain way of doing something without comparing (as with the English words big and fully); the comparative degree, which indicates greater degree (e.g. bigger and more fully [comparative of superiority] or as big and as fully [comparative of equality] or less big and less fully [comparative of inferiority]); and the superlative, which indicates greatest degree (e.g. biggest and most fully [superlative of superiority] or least big and least fully [superlative of inferiority]). Some languages have forms indicating a very large degree of a particular quality (called elative in Semitic linguistics).

Comparatives and superlatives may be formed in morphology by inflection, as with the English and German -er and -(e)st forms and Latin's -ior (superior, excelsior), or syntactically, as with the English more... and most... and the French plus... and le plus... forms.

== List of degrees of comparison of adjectives and adverbs ==
The degrees of comparison found in English are:

- the positive degree (used when not comparing entities): e.g. big, fully
- the comparative degree (used when comparing two or more entities)
  - of superiority: e.g. bigger, more fully
  - of equality: (Note: Also called equative degree.) e.g. as big, as fully
  - of inferiority: e.g. less big, less fully
- the superlative degree (used when comparing three or more entities)
  - of superiority: e.g. biggest, most fully
  - of inferiority: e.g. least big, least fully

Some languages have forms indicating a very large degree of a particular quality (called elative in Semitic linguistics).

== Formation of comparatives and superlatives ==
Comparatives and superlatives may be formed in morphology by inflection, as with the English and German -er and -(e)st forms and Latin's -ior (superior, excelsior), or syntactically, as with the English more... and most... and the French plus... and le plus... forms. Common adjectives and adverbs often produce irregular forms, such as better and best (from good) and less and least (from little/few) in English, and meilleur (from bon) and mieux (from the adverb bien) in French.

== Comparative and superlative constructions ==
Most, if not all languages have some means of forming the comparative, although the means can vary significantly from one language to the next.

Comparatives are often used with a conjunction or other grammatical means to indicate to what the comparison is being made, as with than in English, als in German, etc. In Russian and Greek (Ancient, Koine and Modern), this can be done by placing the compared noun in the genitive case. With superlatives, the population being considered may be explicitly indicated, as in "the best swimmer out of all the girls".

Languages also possess other structures for comparing adjectives and adverbs, such as "as... as" in English.

А few languages apply comparison to nouns and even verbs. One such language is Bulgarian, where expressions like "по̀ човек (po chovek), най човек (nay chovek), по-малко човек (po malko chovek)" (literally more person, most person, less person but normally better kind of a person, best kind of person, not that good kind of a person) and "по̀ обичам (po obicham), най-малко обичам (nay malko obicham)" (I like more, I like the least) are quite usual. (Note: Comparatives in Bulgarian are formed with the particles по and най, separated from the following adjective or adverb by a hyphen. If they are applied to a noun or a verb, they are written as separate words with a grave accent over по po. Comparatives in Macedonian are formed identically but written as one word.)

== Usage when considering only two things ==
In many languages, including English, traditional grammar requires the comparative form to be used when at least two things are being considered, even in constructions where the superlative would be used when considering a larger number. For instance, "May the better man win" would be considered correct if there are two individuals competing. However, this rule is not always observed in informal usage; the form "May the best man win" will often be used in that situation, as is required if there were three or more competitors involved. However, in some cases when two subjects with equal qualities are compared, usage of comparative degree is not necessary. For example, "Ram is as good as Shyam"—positive degree; Since Ram and Shyam are equally good, neither is superior which negates the usage of the comparative. In some contexts this can be written in comparative degree — "Ram is not better than Shyam."

== Rhetorical use of unbalanced comparatives ==
In some contexts such as advertising or political speeches, absolute and relative comparatives are intentionally employed in ways that invite comparison, yet the basis of comparison is not explicit. This is a common rhetorical device used to create an implication of significance where one may not actually be present. Although common, such usage is sometimes considered ungrammatical.

For example:

- Why pay more?
- We work harder.
- We sell for less!
- More doctors recommend it.

== Usage in languages ==
=== Indo-European languages ===
==== English ====
English has two grammatical constructions for expressing comparison: a morphological one formed using the suffixes -er (the "comparative") and -est (the "superlative"), with some irregular forms, and a syntactic one using the adverbs "more", "most", "less" and "least".

As a general rule, words of one syllable require the suffix (except for a few words such as fun, real, right, wrong), while words of three or more syllables require "more" or "most". This leaves words of two syllables—these are idiomatic, some requiring the morphological construction, some requiring the syntactic and some able to use either (e.g., polite can use politer or more polite), with different frequencies according to context.

===== Morphological comparison =====
The suffixes -er (the "comparative") and -est (the "superlative") are of Germanic origin and are cognate with the Latin suffixes -ior and -issimus and Ancient Greek -ῑ́ων : -īōn and -ῐστος : -istos. They are added to most monosyllabic adjectives and a number of two-syllable adjectives of Anglo-Saxon origin, notably those ending in -y (> Old Eng. -iċ) and -ly (> Old. Eng. -līċ), as well as borrowed words fully assimilated into English vocabulary. Usually the words taking these inflections have fewer than three syllables.

This system also contains a number of irregular forms, some of which, like "good", "better", and "best", contain suppletive forms. These irregular forms include:

| Positive | Comparative | Superlative |
|---|---|---|
| good | better | best |
| well (adv.) | better | best |
| bad | worse | worst |
| ill | worse | worst |
| badly (adv.) | worse | worst |
| far | farther | farthest |
| far | further | furthest |
| little | less(er) | least |
| many | more | most |
| much (adv.) | more | most |
| nigh † | near † | nearest |
| near | nearer | nearest |

===== Syntactic comparison =====
In syntactic construction, inserting the words "more" or "most" (Note: "More" and "most" are themselves the irregular comparatives of "many" and "much".) before an adjective or adverb modifies the resulting phrase to express a relative (specifically, greater) degree of that property. Similarly, inserting the diminutives "less" or "least" before an adjective or adverb expresses a lesser degree.

This system is most commonly used with words not of Anglo-Saxon origin – most often those of French, Latin, or Greek origin. This includes adverbs formed with the suffix -ly (e.g., more beautifully) and such words used as adjectives if they would take -ly as adverbs (e.g. most beautiful). It also tends to include longer, technical, or infrequent words. Some more examples:

| Positive | Comparative | Superlative |
|---|---|---|
| beautiful | more beautiful | most beautiful |
| often | more often | most often |
| observant | less observant | least observant |
| coherently | less coherently | least coherently |

===== Absolute adjectives =====
The meanings of some adjectives (the ungradable or absolute type) are not exhibitable in degrees, making comparative constructions of them inappropriate. Some qualities are either present or absent, applicable or not applicable, such as a rock being cretaceous vs. igneous, so it appears illogical to call anything "very cretaceous", or to try to characterize something as "more igneous" than something else.

Some grammarians object to the use of the superlative or comparative with words such as full, complete, unique, or empty, which by definition already denote a totality, an absence, or an absolute. However, such words are routinely and frequently qualified in contemporary speech and writing. This type of usage conveys more of a figurative than a literal meaning, because in a strictly literal sense, something cannot be more or less unique or empty to a greater or lesser degree.

Many prescriptive grammars and style guides include adjectives for inherently superlative qualities to be non-gradable. Thus, they reject expressions such as more perfect, most unique, and most parallel as illogical pleonasms: after all, if something is unique, it is one of a kind, so nothing can be "very unique", or "more unique" than something else.

Other style guides argue that terms like perfect and parallel never apply exactly to things in real life, so they are commonly used to mean nearly perfect, nearly parallel, and so on; in this sense, more perfect (i.e., more nearly perfect, closer to perfect) and more parallel (i.e., more nearly parallel, closer to parallel) are meaningful.

===== Double comparatives =====
If an adjective has two comparative markers, it is known as a double comparative (e.g. more louder, worser). The use of double comparatives is generally associated with Appalachian English and African American Vernacular English, though they were common in Early Modern English and were used by Shakespeare.

"The Duke of Milan / and his more braver daughter could controul thee."—Shakespeare, The Tempest

In recent times, such constructions have been used humorously, or to convey a sense of erudition, in addition to their original purpose of emphasis.

"The female of the species is more deadlier than the male"—Space, "Female of the Species", 1996
"World must prepare for disease more deadlier than Covid, WHO chief warns", The Independent, describing remarks by World Health Organization Director-General Tedros Adhanom Ghebreyesus, 2023

===== Superlative degree of the adjective near =====
The adjective near may be found in the superlative with omission of the preposition to after it, as in Find the restaurant nearest your house (instead of Find the restaurant nearest to your house). Joan Maling (1983) shows that near is best analysed as an adjective with which the use of to is optional, rather than a preposition.

==== Balto-Slavic languages ====
In most Balto-Slavic languages (such as Czech, Polish, Lithuanian and Latvian), the comparative and superlative forms are also declinable adjectives.

In Bulgarian, comparative and superlative forms are formed with the clitics по- (more) and най- (most):

голям (big)
по-голям (bigger)
най-голям (biggest)

In Czech, Polish, Slovak, Ukrainian, Belarusian, Serbo-Croatian and Slovene, the comparative is formed from the base form of an adjective with a suffix and superlative is formed with a circumfix (equivalent to adding a prefix to the comparative).

mladý / młody / mladý / молодий / малады / mlad / mlad (young)
mladší / młodszy / mladší / молодший / малодшы / mlađi / mlajši (younger)
nejmladší / najmłodszy / najmladší / наймолодший / наймалодшы / najmlađi / najmlajši (youngest)

In Russian, comparative and superlative forms are formed with a suffix or with the words более (more) and самый (most):

добрый (kind)
добрее/более добрый (kinder)
добрейший/самый добрый (kindest)

==== Romance languages ====
In contrast to English, the relative and the superlative are joined into the same degree (the superlative), which can be of two kinds: comparative (e.g. "more beautiful") and absolute (e.g. "the most beautiful").

French: The superlative is created from the comparative by inserting the definitive article (la, le, or les), or the possessive article (mon, ton, son, etc.), before "plus" or "moins" and the adjective determining the noun. For instance: Elle est la plus belle femme → (she is the most beautiful woman); Cette ville est la moins chère de France → (this town is the least expensive in France); C'est sa plus belle robe → (It is her most beautiful dress). It can also be created with the suffix "-issime" but only with certain words, for example: "C'est un homme richissime" → (That is the most rich man). Its use is rare and often ironic.

Spanish: The comparative superlative, like in French, has the definite article (such as el, la, los, or las), or the possessive article ("tus," "nuestra," "su," etc.), followed by the comparative ("más" or "menos"), so that "el meñique es el dedo más pequeño" or "el meñique es el más pequeño de los dedos" both mean "the pinky is the smallest finger." Another example would be, “Suzanne es la más graciosa de la clase” (“Suzanne is the funniest in the class”), where the comparison is made within a specific group of people. In Spanish this is often referred to as “relative superlative,” because it compares one item within the group.

Irregular comparatives are "mejor" for "bueno" and "peor" for "malo," which can be used as comparative superlatives also by adding the definite article or possessive article, and when added they express the highest or lowest quality within a group so that "nuestro peor error fue casarnos" is "our worst mistake was to get married."

The article must agree with the gender and number for the noun it modifies. For example, el más alto, la más alta, los más altos, y las más altas.

The absolute superlative is normally formed by modifying the adjective by adding -ísimo, -ísima, -ísimos or -ísimas, depending on the gender or number. Thus, "¡Los chihuahuas son perros pequeñísimos!" is "Chihuahuas are such tiny dogs!" Some irregular superlatives are "máximo" for "grande," "pésimo" for "malo," "ínfimo" for "bajo," "óptimo" for "bueno," "acérrimo" for "acre," "paupérrimo" for "pobre," "celebérrimo" for "célebre."

There is a difference between comparative superlative and absolute superlative: Ella es la más bella → (she is the most beautiful); Ella es bellísima → (she is extremely beautiful).

Portuguese and Italian distinguish comparative superlative (superlativo relativo) and absolute superlative (superlativo absoluto/assoluto). For the comparative superlative they use the words "mais" and "più" between the article and the adjective, like "most" in English. For the absolute superlative they either use "muito"/"molto" and the adjective or modify the adjective by taking away the final vowel and adding issimo (singular masculine), issima (singular feminine), íssimos/issimi (plural masculine), or íssimas/issime (plural feminine). For example:

- Aquele avião é velocíssimo/Quell'aeroplano è velocissimo → That airplane is very fast

There are some irregular forms for some words ending in "-re" and "-le" (deriving from Latin words ending in "-er" and "-ilis") that have a superlative form similar to the Latin one. In the first case words lose the ending "-re" and they gain the endings errimo (singular masculine), errima (singular feminine), érrimos/errimi (plural masculine), or érrimas/errime (plural feminine); in the second case words lose the "-l"/"-le" ending and gain ílimo/illimo (singular masculine), ílima/illima (singular feminine), ílimos/illimi (plural masculine), or ílimas/illime (plural feminine), the irregular form for words ending in "-l"/"-le" is somehow rare and, in Italian but not in Portuguese, it exists only in the archaic or literary language. For example:

- "Acre" (acer in Latin) which means acrid, becomes "acérrimo"/"acerrimo" ("acerrimus" in Latin). "Magro" ("thin" in Portuguese) becomes "magérrimo."
- Italian simile (similis in Latin) which means "similar," becomes (in ancient Italian) "simillimo" ("simillimus" in Latin).
- Portuguese difícil ("hard/difficult") and fácil (facile).

Romanian, similar to Portuguese and Italian, distinguishes comparative and absolute superlatives. The comparative uses the word "mai" before the adjective, which operates like "more" or "-er" in English. For example: luminos → bright, mai luminos → brighter. To weaken the adjective, the word "puțin" (little) is added between "mai" and the adjective, for example mai puțin luminos → less bright. For absolute superlatives, the gender-dependent determinant "cel" precedes "mai," inflected as "cel" for masculine and neuter singular, "cei" for masculine plural, "cea" for feminine singular, and "cele" for feminine and neuter plural. For example: cea mai luminoasă stea → the brightest star; cele mai frumoase fete → the most beautiful girls; cel mai mic morcov → the smallest carrot.

==== Indo-Aryan languages ====
Hindi-Urdu (Hindustani)ː When comparing two quantities makes use of the instrumental case-marker se (से سے) and the noun or pronoun takes the oblique case. Words like aur (और اور) "more, even more", zyādā (ज़्यादा زیادہ) "more" and kam (कम کم) "less" are added for relative comparisons. When equivalence is to be shown, the personal pronouns take the oblique case and add the genitive case-marker kā (का کا) while the nouns just take in the oblique case form and optionally add the genitive case-marker. The word zyādā (ज़्यादा زیادہ) "more" is optional, while kam (कम کم) "less" is required, so that in the absence of either "more" will be inferred.

Hindi-Urdu

vo usse lambī hai
that.NOM that.INST tall.FEM is
She is taller than him/her.

vo usse zyādā lambī hai
that.NOM that.INST more tall.FEM is
She is more tall them him/her.

vo usse aur lambī hai
that.NOM that.INST more tall.FEM is
She is even taller than him/her.

vo uske jitnī lambī hai
that.NOM that.GEN {that much}.REL tall.FEM is
She is as tall as him/her.

vo us bacce jitnī lambī hai
that.NOM that.OBL kid.OBL.MASC {that much}.REL tall.FEM is
She is as tall as the kid.

vo usse kam lambī hai
that.NOM that.INST less tall.FEM is
She is shorter than him/her.

kamrā kalse (zyādā) sāf hai
room.NOM.MASC yesterday.INST more clean is
The room is cleaner compared to yesterday.

Superlatives are made through comparisons with sab ("all") with the instrumental postposition se as the suffix. Comparisons using "least" are rare; it is more common to use an antonym.

Hindi-Urdu

sabse sāf kamrā
all.INST clean room.NOM.MASC
The cleanest room.

sabse kam sāf kamrā
all.INST less clean room.NOM.MASC
The least clean room

sabse gandā kamrā
all.INST dirty.NOM.MASC room.NOM.MASC
The dirtiest room.

kamrā sabse (zyādā) sāf hai
room.NOM.MASC all.INST {} clean is
The room is the cleanest

kamrā sabse kam sāf hai
room.NOM.MASC all.INST less clean is
The room is the least clean

kamrā sabse gandā hai
room.NOM.MASC all.INST dirty.MASC is
The room is the dirtiest

In Sanskritised and Persianised registers of Hindustani, comparative and superlative adjectival forms using suffixes derived from those languages can be found.

| | English | Sanskrit | Persian |
|---|---|---|---|
| Comparative | -er | -tar | |
| Comparative | -er | adhiktar (more) | bêhtar (better) |
| Superlative | -est | -tam | -tarīn |
| Superlative | -est | adhiktam (most) | bêhtarīn (best) |

==== Celtic languages ====
Scottish Gaelic: When comparing one entity to another in the present or the future tense, the adjective is changed by adding an e to the end and i before the final consonant(s) if the final vowel is broad. Then, the adjective is preceded by "nas" to say "more," and as to say "most." (The word na is used to mean than.) Adjectives that begin with f are lenited. and as use different syntax constructions. For example:
Tha mi nas àirde na mo pheathraichean. → I am taller than my sisters.
Is mi as àirde. → I am the tallest.

As in English, some forms are irregular, i.e. nas fheàrr (better), nas miosa (worse), etc.

In other tenses, nas is replaced by na bu and as by a bu, both of which lenite the adjective if possible. If the adjective begins with a vowel or an f followed by a vowel, the word bu is reduced to b'. For example:

- Bha mi na b' àirde na mo pheathraichean. → I was taller than my sisters.
- B' e mi a b' àirde. → I was the tallest.

Welsh is similar to English in many respects. The ending -af is added onto regular adjectives in a similar manner to the English -est, and with (most) long words mwyaf precedes it, as in the English most. Also, many of the most common adjectives are irregular. Unlike English, however, when comparing just two things, the superlative must be used, e.g. of two people - John ydy'r talaf (John is the tallest).

In Welsh, the equative is denoted by inflection in more formal registers, with -ed being affixed to the adjective, usually preceded, but not obligatorily, by cyn (meaning 'as'). For example: Mae Siôn cyn daled â fi (Siôn is as tall as me). Irregular adjectives have specific equative forms, such as da (‘good’): cystal = 'as good as'.

=== Semitic languages ===
==== Akkadian ====
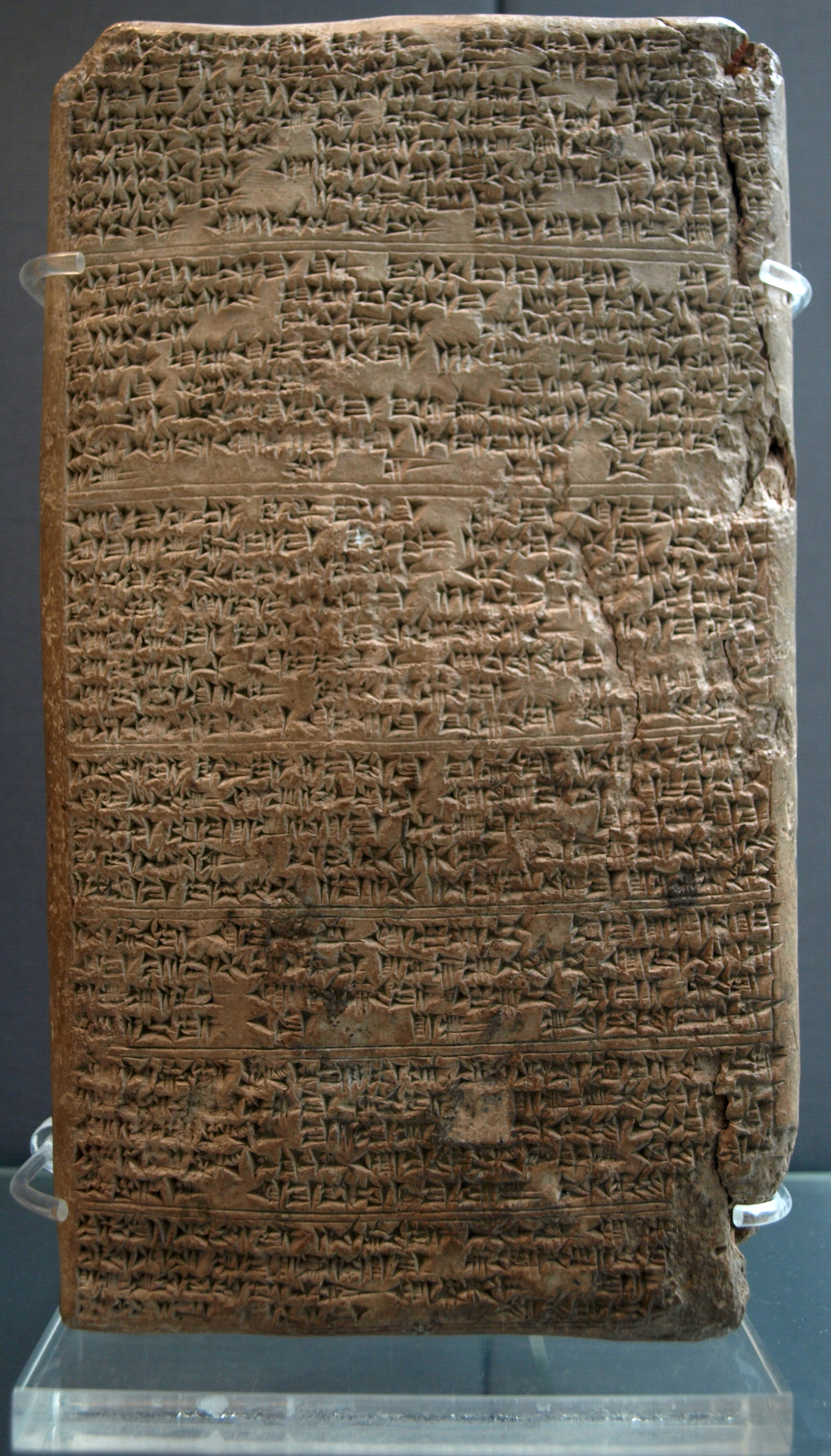
Amarna letter EA 19, Para 2, (last line): "...the Gods and (our Kingly relations), forever"..."may it be, (one verb, (5 signs, e-le-né-ep-pi)), I-n-t-e-r-R-e-l-a-t-e-d-!." (The first sign "e" is rubbed off; only a space-(depression) locates it.)-(high resolution expandible photo)

In Akkadian cuneiform, on a 12-paragraph clay tablet contemporary with the Amarna letters (which span roughly 20 years circa 1350 BC), two striking examples of the superlative extend the common grammatical use. The first is the numeral "10," as well as "7 and 7." The second is a verb-spacement adjustment.

The term "7 and 7" means 'over and over'. The phrase itself is a superlative, but an addition to some of the Amarna letters adds "more" at the end of the phrase (EA 283, Oh to see the King-(pharaoh)): "... I fall at the feet of the king, my lord. I fall at the feet of the king, my lord, 7 and 7 times more, ....". The word 'more' is Akkadian mila, and by Moran is 'more' or 'overflowing'. The meaning in its letter context is "...over and over again, overflowing," (as 'gushingly', or 'obsequiously', as an underling of the king).

The numeral 10 is used for ten times greater in EA 19, Love and Gold, one of King Tushratta's eleven letters to the Pharaoh-(Amenhotep IV-Akhenaton). The following quote using 10, also closes out the small paragraph by the second example of the superlative, where the verb that ends the last sentence is spread across the letter in s-p-a-c-i-n-g, to accentuate the last sentence, and the verb itself (i.e. the relational kingly topic of the paragraph):

".... Now, in keeping with our constant and mutual love, you have made it 10 times greater than the love shown my father. May the gods grant it, and may Teššup, my lord, and Aman make flourish for evermore, just as it is now, this mutual love of ours.

The actual last paragraph line contains three words: 'may it be', 'flourish', and 'us'. The verb flourish (from napāhu?, to light up, to rise), uses: -e-le-né-ep-pi-, and the spaces. The other two words on the line, are made from two characters, and then one: "...may it be, flourish-our (relations)."

=== Finno-Ugric languages ===
==== Hungarian ====
In Hungarian, the comparative of an adjective is generally formed by adding either -abb, -ebb, or -bb. For adjectives ending in a vowel, -bb is added to the ending, and the vowels a and e will be lengthened with an acute accent. For example, furcsa (strange) + -bb yields furcsább (stranger), and gyenge (weak) + -bb yields gyengébb (weaker).

For adjectives ending in a consonant, vowel harmony is observed. Hungarian has two sets of vowels: front (e, é, i, í, ö, ő, ü, and ű) and back (a, á, o, ó, u, and ú). For words whose last vowel is a front vowel, -ebb is added to the ending; for words whose last vowel is a back vowel, -abb is added instead. For example, magas (tall) + -abb yields magasabb (taller), and dühös (angry) + -ebb yields dühösebb (angrier).

Exceptions to these rules include könnyű (easy), which becomes könnyebb (easier) instead of könnyűbb, and szép (beautiful), which becomes szebb (more beautiful) instead of szépebb.

To form the superlative in Hungarian, the prefix leg- is added to the beginning of the comparative form of the adjective. For example, leg- + furcsább (stranger) yields legfurcsább (strangest), and leg- + szebb (more beautiful) yields legszebb (most beautiful).

There are two ways in which comparatives can appear in sentences. The most common way is determiner + subject + comparative adjective + mint (than) + determiner + object. For example, “The cheetah is faster than its prey” becomes:

a gepárd gyors-abb mint a zsákmány-a

ᴅᴇᴛ.ᴅᴇꜰ cheetah fast-ᴄᴍᴘʀ than ᴅᴇᴛ.ᴅᴇꜰ prey-𝟥ꜱɢ.ᴘᴏꜱꜱ

Note that Hungarian makes no distinction between phrasal and clausal comparisons in its grammar; both ‘than its prey’ and ‘than its prey is’ are written as ‘mint a zsákmánya’. The other, less common way to write comparative sentences is determiner + subject + comparative adjective + determiner + adessive object. So, the same sentence would be:

a gepárd gyors-abb a zsákmány-á-nál

ᴅᴇᴛ.ᴅᴇꜰ cheetah fast-ᴄᴍᴘʀ ᴅᴇᴛ.ᴅᴇꜰ prey-𝟥ꜱɢ.ᴘᴏꜱꜱ-ᴀᴅᴇ

==== Estonian ====
In Estonian, the superlative form can usually be formed in two ways. One is a periphrastic construction with kõige followed by the comparative form. This form exists for all adjectives. For example: the comparative form of sinine 'blue' is sinisem and therefore the periphrastic superlative form is kõige sinisem. There is also a synthetic ("short") superlative form, which is formed by adding -m to the end of the plural partitive case. For sinine the plural partitive form is siniseid and so siniseim is the short superlative. The short superlative does not exist for all adjectives and, in contrast to the kõige-form, has a lot of exceptions.

==== Finnish ====
In Finnish, the comparative of the adjective is formed by adding the suffix -mpi to the inflecting stem of the adjective. Hence suuri (big) yields suurempi. The superlative being itself an adjective, it must be inflected to agree with the noun it modifies, noting that the inflecting stem of the -mpi ending is -mma/-mmä (depending on the vowel harmony of the adjective). Hence pieni talo (small house) yields pienemmän talon edessä (in front of the smaller house). There is a small set of exceptions, the most noteworthy being the comparative of the adjective hyvä, good, that becomes parempi.

The comparative of the adverb is marked by the -mmin ending:

| Finnish | English |
|---|---|
| nopea, nopeasti, nopeammin | 'quick, quickly, more quickly/faster' |
| kaunis, kauniisti, kauniimmin | 'beautiful, beautifully, more beautifully' |
| hidas, hitaasti, hitaammin | 'slow, slowly, more slowly' |
| helppo, helposti, helpommin | 'easy, easily, more easily' |

The adverbial form hyvin of the adjective hyvä, good, becomes paremmin, meaning in a better way.

The complement of the comparative can be indicated in two ways:

- if it is a nominal group, it can be put in the partitive case in front of the adjective or adverb in the comparative. Tämä talo on tuota isompi. This house is bigger than that one. Tämä lähtevä juna kulkee seuraavaa junaa nopeammin. This departing train travels faster than the next one.
- in all cases, the complement can be introduced by the word kuin (as) following the comparative. Tämä talo on isompi kuin tuo. This house is bigger than that one. Tämä lähtevä juna kulkee nopeammin kuin seuraava. This departing train travels faster than the next one. Se on tapahtunut nopeammin kuin osaamme ennakoida. It all happened faster than we could anticipate.

== Universals of degrees of comparison ==
Russell Ultan (1972) surveyed 20 languages and observed that the comparative and superlative are inflected forms of (near-)identical bases with respective to the positive and equative. Jonathan D. Bobaljik (2012) contends that Ultan’s generalization is a strong contender for a linguistic universal. Bobaljik formulates the Comparative-Superlative Generalization: With respect to the positive, if any adjective’s comparative degree were suppletive, so would its superlative; vice versa, if any adjective’s superlative degree were suppletive, then so would its comparative.

Bobaljik phrases the Containment Hypothesis thus: "The representation of the superlative properly contains that of the comparative (in all languages that have a morphological superlative)". Indeed:

- in many languages (Persian, Ubykh, Cherokee, Chukchi, etc.) the superlative transparently contains the comparative;
- in Celtic languages, Arabic, Klon, Totonac, etc. the comparatives and the superlatives are formally similar;
- in Romance languages, Greek, Maltese, etc. the superlatives are derived from the comparatives by means of the addition of definite articles.

Additionally, Bobaljik asserts that Universal Grammar lacks the superlative morpheme.

== See also ==
- Augmentative
- Comparative illusion
- Equative construction
- Fewer vs. less
- Figure of speech
- Greatness
- Intensifier
- Metaphor
- Simile

== Notes and references ==
=== References ===
==== Works cited ====
- Bobaljik, J. D. 2012. Universals in Comparative Morphology. MIT Press.
- Shapiro, Michael C. (2003). "Hindi". In Cardona, George; Jain, Dhanesh (eds.). The Indo-Aryan Languages. Routledge. pp. 250–285. ISBN 978-0-415-77294-5.
- Ultan, Russell. 1972. Some features of basic comparative constructions. Working Papers in Language Universals 9, 117-132.
