= English usage controversies =

Disputes over "correct" grammar and style

In the English language, there are grammatical constructions that many native speakers use unquestioningly yet certain writers call incorrect. Differences of usage or opinion may stem from differences between formal and informal speech and other matters of register, differences among dialects (whether regional, class-based, generational, or other), difference between the social norms of spoken and written English, and so forth. Disputes may arise when style guides disagree, when an older standard gradually loses traction, or when a guideline or judgment is confronted by large amounts of conflicting evidence or has its rationale challenged.

== Examples ==
Some of the sources that consider some of the following examples incorrect consider the same examples to be acceptable in dialects other than Standard English or in an informal register; others consider certain constructions to be incorrect in any variety of English. On the other hand, many or all of the following examples are considered correct by some sources.

- Generic you – e.g., "Brushing your teeth is a good habit" as opposed to "Brushing one's teeth is a good habit"
- Singular they – e.g., "Somebody left their sweater" or "My friend left their sweater here"
- Flat adverbs – e.g., "It happened quicker than I expected" as opposed to "It happened more quickly than I expected" or "Sleep good" as opposed to "Sleep well"
- Split infinitives – e.g., "To boldly go where no man has gone before" as opposed to "To go boldly where no man has gone before"
- Beginning a sentence with a conjunction – e.g., "But Dad said not to jump on the bed!"
- Double genitive – e.g. "a friend of theirs" as opposed to "a friend of them" or "their friend"
- Using "me" vs. "I" in the subject complement ("It's me" as opposed to "It's I" or "It is I") or other cases – e.g., "Me and Bob" vs. "Bob and I"
- Using "I" vs. "me" in the oblique case, e.g., "He gave the ball to Bob and I" instead of "He gave the ball to Bob and me". This is often called a hypercorrection, since it is perceived as related to avoidance of the stigmatized incorrect use of the oblique form.
- The validity of aren't as a negative first-person singular contraction for to be in interrogative uses – e.g., "Aren't I the one you were talking about?"
- The grammatical means for marking counterfactuality – e.g., "If I were/was a rich man" and "If the pandemic didn't happen/hadn't happened".
- Whether to use who or whom in various contexts
- The use of less and fewer with plural countable nouns
- The use of amount of, a good deal of, and a great deal of with plural countable nouns
- Double negatives as negative concord – e.g., "We don't need no education"
- Certain double modals – e.g., "You might could do it" – not considered standard, but used for example in Southern American English
- Double copula – e.g., "What has to happen is, is that the money has to come from somewhere"
- Preposition stranding – e.g., "You have nothing to be afraid of" (vs. "You have nothing of which to be afraid") – criticized by grammarians in the 1600s by analogy with Latin grammar and by some teachers since, though many have always accepted it as part of standard English
- Distinction or lack of it between the past and past participle forms of the verb – e.g. "I should have went" and "I done that yesterday".
- Order of quoted punctuation marks, i.e., American style ("Many dreams were characterized as 'raw,' 'powerful,' and 'evocative'") vs. British style ('Many dreams were characterized as "raw", "powerful" and "evocative"'). Some American authorities (such as the APA and CMS) require the former, while others (such as the LSA) allow, prefer, or require the latter.
- Whether the verbs open/close to denote turn on/turn off can be used as English collocations (i.e. "Open the lights, please" for "Turn on the lights, please"). The expression is a metaphrase and is common among nonnative English speakers of Hebrew, Croatian, Filipino, French, Thai, Chinese, Greek, Italian descent, and also among French Canadians (or some speakers of Quebec English), where "open" and "close" for "on" and "off" are used instead. This construction is grammatically correct but only out of context. The calquing and linguistic transfer make this construction foreign to other English speakers.
- Dangling modifiers (including dangling participles) are often cited as potentially causing confusion or incorrect.

Several proscriptions concern matters of writing style and clarity but not grammatical correctness:

- Various style guides warn writers to avoid the passive voice.
- Gender neutrality in English:
  - Gender-specific and gender-neutral pronouns – Replacing masculine pronouns where they are meant to refer to a person of either gender with both masculine and feminine pronouns, alternative phrasing, the singular they or newly invented words such as "hir" and "ze"
  - Terms for humans in general – Replacing nouns such as "mankind" with "humankind"
  - Gender marking in job titles – Replacing nouns such as "chairman" and "manpower" with alternatives such as "chairperson" and "staffing levels"
  - Use of Ms. for equality with Mr., as opposed to Miss and Mrs., which specify whether a woman is married; there are no similar titles for men that specify whether a man is married, though Mstr. (pronounced "master") is occasionally used for a male child.

For an alphabetical list of disputes concerning a single word or phrase, see List of English words with disputed usage.

== Factors in disputes ==
The following circumstances may feature in disputes:

=== Myths and superstitions ===
There are a number of alleged rules of unclear origin that have no rational basis or are based on things such as misremembered rules taught in school. They are sometimes described by authorities as superstitions or myths. These include rules such as not beginning sentences with "and" or "because" or not ending them with prepositions.

=== No central authority ===
Unlike some languages, such as French (which has the Académie Française), English has no single authoritative governing academy, so assessments of correctness are made by "self-appointed authorities who, reflecting varying judgments of acceptability and appropriateness, often disagree."

=== Education ===
While some variations in the use of language correlate with age, sex, ethnic group, or region, others may be taught in schools and be preferred in the context of interaction with strangers. These forms may also gain prestige as the standard language of professionals, politicians, etc., and be called Standard English (SE), whereas forms associated with less educated speakers may be called nonstandard (or less commonly substandard) English.

=== Stigma ===
The prescriptivist tradition may affect attitudes toward certain usages and thus the preferences of some speakers.

=== Hypercorrection ===
Because of the stigma attached to violating prescriptivist norms, speakers and writers sometimes incorrectly extend usage rules beyond their scope in attempting to avoid mistakes.

=== Classical languages ===
Prescriptivist arguments about various English constructions' correctness have sometimes been based on Latin grammar.

=== Analogy with other constructions ===
It is sometimes argued that a certain usage is more logical than another, or that it is more consistent with other usages, by analogy with different grammatical constructions. For instance, it may be argued that the accusative form must be used for the components of a coordinate construction where it would be used for a single pronoun.

Speakers and writers frequently do not consider it necessary to justify their positions on a particular usage, taking its correctness or incorrectness for granted. In some cases, people believe an expression to be incorrect partly because they also falsely believe it to be newer than it really is.

== Prescription and description ==
It is often said that the difference between prescriptivist and descriptivist approaches is that the former prescribes how English should be spoken and written and the latter describes how English is spoken and written, but this is an oversimplification. Prescriptivist works may contain claims about the incorrectness of various common English constructions, but they also deal with topics other than grammar, such as style. Prescriptivists and descriptivists differ in that, when presented with evidence that purported rules disagree with most native speakers' actual usage, the prescriptivist may declare that those speakers are wrong, whereas the descriptivist will assume that the usage of the overwhelming majority of native speakers defines the language, and that the prescriptivist has an idiosyncratic view of correct usage. Particularly in older prescriptivist works, recommendations may be based on personal taste, confusion between informality and ungrammaticality, or arguments related to other languages, such as Latin.

== Different forms of English ==
=== English internationally ===
English is spoken worldwide, and the Standard Written English grammar generally taught in schools around the world will vary only slightly. Nonetheless, disputes can sometimes arise: for example, it is a matter of some debate in India whether British, American, or Indian English is the best form to use.

=== Regional dialects and ethnolects ===
In contrast to their generally high level of tolerance for the dialects of other English-speaking countries, speakers often express disdain for features of certain regional or ethnic dialects, such as Southern American English's use of y'all, Geordies' use of "yous" as the second person plural personal pronoun, and nonstandard forms of "to be" such as "The old dock bes under water most of the year" (Newfoundland English) or "That dock be under water every other week" (African-American Vernacular English).

Such disdain may not be restricted to points of grammar; speakers often criticize regional accents and vocabulary as well. Arguments related to regional dialects must center on questions of what constitutes Standard English. For example, since fairly divergent dialects from many countries are widely accepted as Standard English, it is not always clear why certain regional dialects, which may be very similar to their standard counterparts, are not.

=== Register ===
Different constructions are acceptable in different registers of English. For example, a given construction will often be seen as too formal or too informal for a situation.

== See also ==
- Barbarism (linguistics)
- Common English usage misconceptions
- List of dialects of English
