= Split infinitive =

English grammatical construction

Infinitives' splitting, up with which
one may simply put ... Fascinating.

— Sarek

A split infinitive is a grammatical construction specific to English in which an adverb (or adverbial phrase) appears within an infinitive phrase, e.g. "... to boldly go where no man has gone before." Since the 19th century linguistic prescriptivists have sought to disallow split infinitives categorically, but recent editions of English usage guides have largely dropped their objection.

== History of the construction ==
=== Old and Middle English ===
In Old English, infinitives were single words ending in -n or -an (comparable to modern Dutch and German -n, -en). Gerunds were formed using to followed by a verbal noun in the dative case, which ended in -anne or -enne (e.g., tō cumenne = "coming, to come"). In Middle English, the bare infinitive and the gerund coalesced into the same form ending in -(e)n (e.g., comen "come"; to comen "to come"). The "to" infinitive was not split in Old or Early Middle English.

The first known example of a split infinitive in English, in which a pronoun rather than an adverb splits the infinitive, is in Layamon's Brut (early 13th century):

and he cleopede him to; alle his wise cnihtes.
for to him reade;

And he called to him all his wise knights
to him advise;

This may be a poetic inversion for the sake of meter, and therefore says little about whether Layamon would have felt the construction to be syntactically natural. However, no such reservation applies to the following prose example from John Wycliffe (14th century), who often split infinitives:

For this was gret unkyndenesse, to this manere treten there brother.

For this was great unkindness, to in this manner treat their brother.

=== Modern English ===
After its rise in Middle English, the construction became rare in the 15th and 16th centuries. William Shakespeare used it at least once. The uncontroversial example appears to be a syntactical inversion for the sake of meter:

Root pity in thy heart, that when it grows
Thy pity may deserve to pitied be (Sonnet 142).

Edmund Spenser, John Dryden, Alexander Pope, and the King James Version of the Bible used none, and they are very rare in the writing of Samuel Johnson. John Donne used them several times, though, and Samuel Pepys also used at least one. No reason for the near disappearance of the split infinitive is known; in particular, no prohibition is recorded.

Split infinitives reappeared in the 18th century and became more common in the 19th. Daniel Defoe, Benjamin Franklin, William Wordsworth, Abraham Lincoln, George Eliot, Henry James, and Willa Cather are among the writers who used them. Examples in the poems of Robert Burns attest its presence also in 18th-century Scots:

Who dared to nobly stem tyrannic pride. ("The Cottar's Saturday Night")

In colloquial speech, the construction came to enjoy widespread use. Today, according to the American Heritage Book of English Usage, "people split infinitives all the time without giving it a thought." In corpora of contemporary spoken English, some adverbs such as always and completely appear more often in the split position than the unsplit.

=== Theories of origins ===
Although it is difficult to say why the construction developed in Middle English, or why it revived so powerfully in Modern English, a number of theories have been postulated.

==== Analogy ====
Traditional grammarians have suggested that the construction appeared because people frequently place adverbs before finite verbs. George Curme writes: "If the adverb should immediately precede the finite verb, we feel that it should immediately precede also the infinitive ..." Thus, if one says:

She gradually got rid of her stutter. and
She will gradually get rid of her stutter.

one may, by analogy, wish to say:

She wants to gradually get rid of her stutter.

This is supported by the fact that split infinitives are often used as echoes, as in the following exchange, in which the riposte parodies the collocation in the original sentence:

Child: I accidentally forgot to feed the hamster.
Parent: Well, you'll have to try harder not to "accidentally forget", won't you?

This is an example of an adverb being transferred into split infinitive position from a parallel position in a different construction.

==== Transformational grammar ====
Transformational grammarians have attributed the construction to a re-analysis of the role of to.

=== Types ===
In the modern language, splitting usually involves a single adverb coming between the verb and its marker. Very frequently, this is an emphatic adverb, for example:

I need you all to really pull your weight.
I'm gonna (going to) totally pulverise him.

Sometimes it is a negation, as in the self-referential joke:

Writers should learn to not split infinitives.

However, in modern colloquial English, almost any adverb may be found in this syntactic position, especially when the adverb and the verb form a close syntactic unit (really-pull, not-split).

Compound split infinitives, i.e., infinitives split by more than one word, usually involve a pair of adverbs or a multi-word adverbial:

We are determined to completely and utterly eradicate the disease.
He is thought to almost never have made such a gesture before.
This is a great opportunity to once again communicate our basic message.

Examples of non-adverbial elements participating in the split-infinitive construction seem rarer in Modern English than in Middle English. The pronoun all commonly appears in this position:

It was their nature to all hurt one another.

and may even be combined with an adverb:

I need you to all really pull your weight.

However an object pronoun, as in the Layamon example above, would be unusual in modern English, perhaps because this might cause a listener to misunderstand the to as a preposition:

*And he called to him all his wise knights to him advise.

While, structurally, acceptable as poetic formulation, this would result in a garden path sentence, particularly evident if the indirect object is omitted:

Sentence	Initial likely partial parse	Final parse
*And he called all his wise knights to him advise.	And he called all his knights to come to him, and advise	And he called all his knights, so that they might advise him

Other parts of speech would be very unusual in this position. However, in verse, poetic inversion for the sake of meter or of bringing a rhyme word to the end of a line often results in abnormal syntax, as with Shakespeare's split infinitive (to pitied be, cited above), in fact an inverted passive construction in which the infinitive is split by a past participle. Presumably, this would not have occurred in a prose text by the same author.

When multiple infinitives are linked by a conjunction, the particle to tends to be used only once at the beginning of the sequence: to eat, drink, and be merry. In this case, the conjunction and any other words that fall between the to and the final infinitive have seldom been deemed to create a split infinitive, and almost always have been considered uncontroversial. Examples include "We pray you to proceed / And justly and religiously unfold ..." (Shakespeare, Henry V, Act II, scene 9) and "... she is determined to be independent, and not live with aunt Pullet" (George Eliot, The Mill on the Floss, volume VI, chapter I).

== History of the term ==
It was not until the very end of the 19th century that terminology emerged to describe the construction. The earliest use of the term split infinitive on record dates from 1890. The now rare cleft infinitive is almost as old, attested from 1893; in the 1890s it was briefly the more common term but almost disappeared after 1905. "Splitting the infinitive" is slightly older, going back to 1887. According to the main etymological dictionaries, infinitive-splitting and infinitive-splitter followed in 1926 and 1927, respectively. The term compound split infinitive, referring to a split infinitive with more than one word between the particle and the infinitive, is not found in these dictionaries and appears to be very recent.

This terminology implies analysing the full infinitive as a two-word infinitive, which not all grammarians accept. As one who used "infinitive" to mean the single-word verb, Otto Jespersen challenged the epithet: "'To' is no more an essential part of an infinitive than the definite article is an essential part of a nominative, and no one would think of calling 'the good man' a split nominative." However, no alternative terminology has been proposed.

== History of the controversy ==
No other grammatical issue has so divided English speakers since the split infinitive was declared to be a solecism in the 19th century: raise the subject of English usage in any conversation today and it is sure to be mentioned.

— Henry Watson Fowler, Pocket Fowler's Modern English Usage

Although it is sometimes reported that a prohibition on split infinitives goes back to Renaissance times, and frequently the 18th century scholar Robert Lowth is cited as the originator of the prescriptive rule, such a rule is not to be found in Lowth's writing, and is not known to appear in any text before the 19th century.

Possibly the earliest comment against split infinitives was by the American John Comly in 1803.

An adverb should not be placed between the verb of the infinitive mood and the preposition to, which governs it; as Patiently to wait – not To patiently wait.

Another early prohibition came from an anonymous American in 1834:

The practice of separating the prefix of the infinitive mode from the verb, by the intervention of an adverb, is not unfrequent among uneducated persons ... I am not conscious, that any rule has been heretofore given in relation to this point ... The practice, however, of not separating the particle from its verb, is so general and uniform among good authors, and the exceptions are so rare, that the rule which I am about to propose will, I believe, prove to be as accurate as most rules, and may be found beneficial to inexperienced writers. It is this :—The particle, TO, which comes before the verb in the infinitive mode, must not be separated from it by the intervention of an adverb or any other word or phrase; but the adverb should immediately precede the particle, or immediately follow the verb.

In 1840, Richard Taylor also condemned split infinitives as a "disagreeable affectation", and in 1859, Solomon Barrett Jr., called them "a common fault." However, the issue seems not to have attracted wider public attention until Henry Alford addressed it in his Plea for the Queen's English in 1864:

A correspondent states as his own usage, and defends, the insertion of an adverb between the sign of the infinitive mood and the verb. He gives as an instance, "to scientifically illustrate." But surely this is a practice entirely unknown to English speakers and writers. It seems to me, that we ever regard the to of the infinitive as inseparable from its verb. And, when we have already a choice between two forms of expression, "scientifically to illustrate" and "to illustrate scientifically," there seems no good reason for flying in the face of common usage.

Others followed, among them Bache, 1869 ("The to of the infinitive mood is inseparable from the verb"); William B. Hodgson, 1889; and Raub, 1897 ("The sign to must not be separated from the remaining part of the infinitive by an intervening word").

Even as these authorities were condemning the split infinitive, others were endorsing it: Brown, 1851 (saying some grammarians had criticized it and it was less elegant than other adverb placements but sometimes clearer); Hall, 1882; Onions, 1904; Jespersen, 1905; and Fowler and Fowler, 1906. Despite the defence by some grammarians, by the beginning of the 20th century the prohibition was firmly established in the press. In the 1907 edition of The King's English, the Fowler brothers wrote:

The 'split' infinitive has taken such hold upon the consciences of journalists that, instead of warning the novice against splitting his infinitives, we must warn him against the curious superstition that the splitting or not splitting makes the difference between a good and a bad writer.

In large parts of the school system, the construction was opposed with ruthless vigour. A correspondent to the BBC on a programme about English grammar in 1983 remarked:

One reason why the older generation feel so strongly about English grammar is that we were severely punished if we didn't obey the rules! One split infinitive, one whack; two split infinitives, two whacks; and so on.

There was frequent skirmishing between the splitters and anti-splitters until the 1960s. George Bernard Shaw wrote letters to newspapers supporting writers who used the split infinitive. Raymond Chandler complained to the editor of The Atlantic about a proofreader who interfered with Chandler's split infinitives:

By the way, would you convey my compliments to the purist who reads your proofs and tell him or her that I write in a sort of broken-down patois which is something like the way a Swiss-waiter talks, and that when I split an infinitive, God damn it, I split it so it will remain split, and when I interrupt the velvety smoothness of my more or less literate syntax with a few sudden words of barroom vernacular, this is done with the eyes wide open and the mind relaxed and attentive. The method may not be perfect, but it is all I have.

Follett, in Modern American Usage (1966) writes: "The split infinitive has its place in good composition. It should be used when it is expressive and well led up to." Fowler (Gowers' revised second edition, 1965) offers the following example of the consequences of refusal to split infinitives: "The greatest difficulty about assessing the economic achievements of the Soviet Union is that its spokesmen try absurdly to exaggerate them; in consequence the visitor may tend badly to underrate them" (italics added). This question results: "Has dread of the split infinitive led the writer to attach the adverbs ['absurdly' and 'badly'] to the wrong verbs, and would he not have done better to boldly split both infinitives, since he cannot put the adverbs after them without spoiling his rhythm" (italics added)? Bernstein (1985) argues that, although infinitives should not always be split, they should be split where doing so improves the sentence: "The natural position for a modifier is before the word it modifies. Thus the natural position for an adverb modifying an infinitive should be just ... after the to" (italics added). Bernstein continues: "Curme's contention that the split infinitive is often an improvement ... cannot be disputed." Heffernan and Lincoln, in their modern English composition textbook, agree with the above authors. Some sentences, they write, "are weakened by ... cumbersome splitting," but in other sentences "an infinitive may be split by a one-word modifier that would be awkward in any other position."

== Principal objections to the split infinitive ==
Objections to the split infinitive fall into three categories, of which only the first is accorded any credence by linguists.

=== The descriptivist objection ===
One of the earliest arguments against the split infinitive, expressed by an anonymous contributor to the New-England Magazine in 1834, was based on the impression that it was not an observable feature of English as used by "good authors." Henry Alford, in his Plea for the Queen's English in 1864 went further, stating that use of the "split infinitive" was "a practice entirely unknown to English speakers and writers."

In principle, there is a consensus that language teachers should advise on proper usage on the basis of what is observed to be current practice in the language. If the early critics of the construction did not observe it to be usual in (the prestige variety of) English as they knew it, their advice to avoid it was legitimate. However it would be difficult to argue that way today, as the split infinitive has become very common.

=== The argument from the full infinitive ===
A second argument is summed up by Alford's statement "It seems to me that we ever regard the to of the infinitive as inseparable from its verb."

The to in the infinitive construction, which is found throughout the Germanic languages, is originally a preposition before the dative of a verbal noun, but in the modern languages it is widely regarded as a particle that serves as a marker of the infinitive. In German and Dutch, this marker (zu and te respectively) sometimes precedes the infinitive, but is not regarded as part of it. In English, on the other hand, it is traditional to speak of the "bare infinitive" without to and the "full infinitive" with it, and to conceive of to as part of the full infinitive. (In the sentence "I had my daughter clean her room," clean is a bare infinitive; in "I told my daughter to clean her room," to clean is a full infinitive.) Possibly this is because the absence of an inflected infinitive form made it useful to include the particle in the citation form of the verb, and in some nominal constructions in which other Germanic languages would omit it (e.g., to know her is to love her). The concept of a two-word infinitive can reinforce an intuitive sense that the two words belong together. For instance, the rhetorician John Duncan Quackenbos said, "To have is as much one thing, and as inseparable by modifiers, as the original form habban, or the Latin habere." The usage writer John Opdycke based a similar argument on the closest French, German, and Latin translations.

However, the two-part infinitive is disputed, and some linguists argue that the infinitive in English is a single-word verb form, which may or may not be preceded by the particle to. Some modern generative analysts classify to as a "peculiar" auxiliary verb; other analysts, as the infinitival subordinator.

=== The argument from classical languages ===
A frequent argument of those who tolerate split infinitives is that the split-infinitive prohibition is based solely on a misguided comparison with Latin. However, the argument from the classical languages may be a straw man argument, as the most important critics of the split infinitive never used it. Although many writers who support the split infinitive suggest that this argument motivated the early opponents of the construction, there is little primary source evidence for this; indeed, Richard Bailey has noted that, despite the lack of evidence, this theory has simply become "part of the folklore of linguistics".

An infinitive in Latin or Greek is never used with a marker equivalent to English to, and a Latin infinitive cannot be split. The argument would be that the construction should be avoided because it is not found in the classics. The claim that those who dislike split infinitives are applying rules of Latin grammar to English is asserted by many authorities who accept the split infinitive. One example is in the American Heritage Book of English Usage: "The only rationale for condemning the construction is based on a false analogy with Latin." The assertion is also made in the Oxford Guide to Plain English, Compact Oxford English Dictionary, and Steven Pinker's The Language Instinct, among others.

The argument implies an adherence to the humanist idea of the greater purity of the classics, which, particularly in Renaissance times, led people to regard as inferior aspects of English that differed from Latin. Today no linguist would accept an argument that judges the usage of one language by the grammar of another. Besides, if Latin has no equivalent of the marker to, it provides no model for the question of where to put it, and therefore supports neither splitting nor not-splitting. As Richard Lederer puts it: "there is no precedent in these languages for condemning the split infinitive because in Greek and Latin (and all the other Romance languages) the infinitive is a single word that is impossible to sever." Maintaining this togetherness or oneness of the infinitive, perhaps, is what was being attempted by those who proscribed its splitting.

== Current views ==
"When I split an infinitive, God damn it, I split it so it will stay split."

— Raymond Chandler, 1947.

Present style and usage manuals deem simple split infinitives unobjectionable. For example, Curme's Grammar of the English Language (1931) says that not only is the split infinitive correct, but it "should be furthered rather than censured, for it makes for clearer expression." The Columbia Guide to Standard American English claims that the split infinitive "eliminates all possibility of ambiguity" in contrast to the "potential for confusion" in an unsplit construction. Merriam–Webster's Dictionary of English Usage says: "the objection to the split infinitive has never had a rational basis." According to Mignon Fogarty, "today almost everyone agrees that it is OK to split infinitives."

Nevertheless, many teachers of English still admonish students against using split infinitives in writing. Because the prohibition has become so widely known, the Columbia Guide recommends that writers "follow the conservative path [of avoiding split infinitives when they are not necessary], especially when you're uncertain of your readers' expectations and sensitivities in this matter." Likewise, the Oxford dictionaries do not regard the split infinitive as ungrammatical, but on balance consider it likely to produce a weak style and advise against its use for formal correspondence. R. W. Burchfield's revision of Fowler's Modern English Usage goes farther (quoting Burchfield's own 1981 book The Spoken Word): "Avoid splitting infinitives whenever possible, but do not suffer undue remorse if a split infinitive is unavoidable for the completion of a sentence already begun." Still more strongly, older editions of The Economist Style Guide said, "Happy the man who has never been told that it is wrong to split an infinitive: the ban is pointless. Unfortunately, to see it broken is so annoying to so many people that you should observe it" (but added "To never split an infinitive is quite easy."). This recommendation, however, is weakened in the 12th edition. After stating that the ban is pointless, The Economist Style Guide now says "To see a split infinitive nevertheless annoys some readers, so try to avoid placing a modifier between "to" and the verb in an infinitive. But if moving the modifier would ruin the rhythm, change the meaning or even just put the emphasis in the wrong place, splitting the infinitive is the best option."

As well as varying according to register, tolerance of split infinitives varies according to type. While most authorities accept split infinitives in general, it is not hard to construct an example that any native speaker would reject. Wycliff's Middle English compound split would, if transferred to modern English, be regarded by most people as un-English:

It was most unkind to in this manner treat their brother.

Attempts to define the boundaries of normality are controversial. In 1996, the usage panel of The American Heritage Book was evenly divided for and against such sentences as,

I expect him to completely and utterly fail

but more than three-quarters of the panel rejected

We are seeking a plan to gradually, systematically, and economically relieve the burden.

Here the problem appears to be the breaking up of the verbal phrase to be seeking a plan to relieve: a segment of the head verbal phrase is so far removed from the remainder that the listener or reader must expend greater effort to understand the sentence. By contrast, 87 percent of the panel deemed acceptable the multi-word adverbial in

We expect our output to more than double in a year

not surprisingly perhaps, because here there is no other place to put the words more than without substantially recasting the sentence.

A special case is the splitting of an infinitive by the negation in sentences like

I soon learned to not provoke her.
I want to not see you any more.

Here traditional idiom, placing the negation before the marker (I soon learned not to provoke her) or with verbs of desire, negating the finite verb (I don't want to see you anymore) remains easy and natural, and is still overwhelmingly the more common construction. Some argue that the two forms have different meanings, while others see a grammatical difference, but most speakers do not make such a distinction.

== Avoiding split infinitives ==
Writers who avoid splitting infinitives either place the splitting element elsewhere in the sentence or reformulate the sentence, perhaps rephrasing it without an infinitive and thus avoiding the issue. However, a sentence such as "to more than double" must be completely rewritten to avoid the split infinitive; it is ungrammatical to put the words "more than" anywhere else in the sentence. While split infinitives can be avoided, a writer must be careful not to produce an awkward or ambiguous sentence. Fowler (1926) stressed that, if a sentence is to be rewritten to remove a split infinitive, this must be done without compromising the language:

It is of no avail merely to fling oneself desperately out of temptation; one must so do it that no traces of the struggle remain; that is, sentences must be thoroughly remodeled instead of having a word lifted from its original place and dumped elsewhere ...

In some cases, moving the adverb creates an ungrammatical sentence or changes the meaning. R. L. Trask uses this example:

- She decided to gradually get rid of the teddy bears she had collected.

"Gradually" splits the infinitive "to get rid of". However, if the adverb were moved, where could it go?

- She decided gradually to get rid of the teddy bears she had collected.

This might imply that the decision was gradual.

- She decided to get rid of the teddy bears she had collected gradually.

This implies that the collecting process was gradual.

- She decided to get gradually rid of the teddy bears she had collected.

This sounds awkward, as it splits the phrase "get rid of".

- She decided to get rid gradually of the teddy bears she had collected.

Trask considers this almost as unwieldy as its immediate predecessor.

- Gradually, she decided to get rid of the teddy bears she had collected.

This might imply that her decision or the fact that she will get rid of her teddy bears is gradual.

The sentence can be rewritten to maintain its meaning, however, by using a noun or a different grammatical aspect of the verb, or by avoiding the informal "get rid of":

- She decided to get rid of her teddy bear collection gradually.
- She decided she would gradually get rid of the teddy bears she had collected.
- She decided to rid herself gradually of the teddy bears she had collected.

Fowler notes that the option of rewriting is always available but questions whether it is always worth the trouble.

== See also ==
- Common English usage misconceptions
