= Common English usage misconceptions =

Beliefs about the use of the English language considered by others as wrong

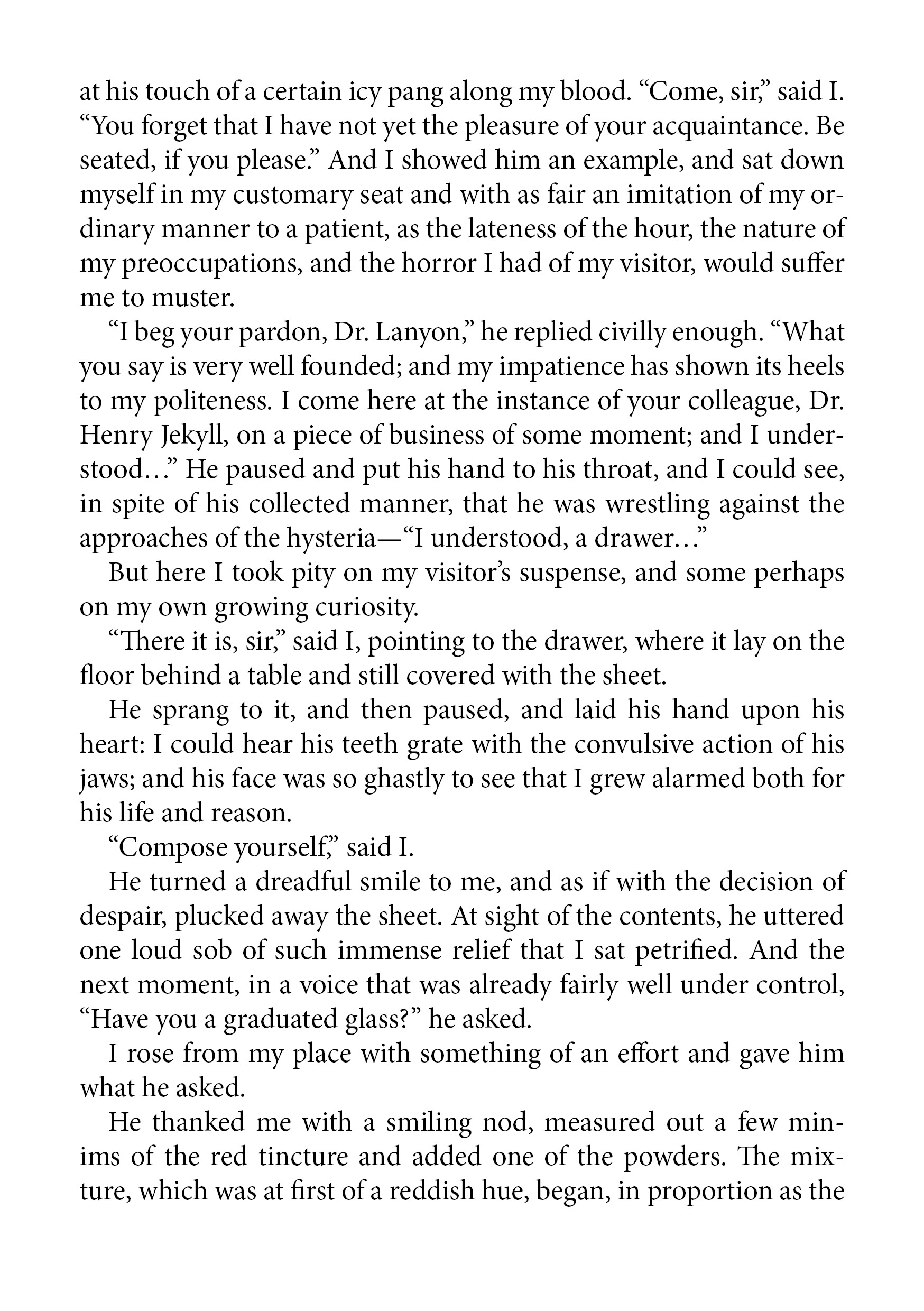
Text from Robert Louis Stevenson's Strange Case of Dr Jekyll and Mr Hyde featuring one-sentence paragraphs and sentences beginning with the conjunctions "but" and "and"

This list comprises widespread modern beliefs about English language usage that are documented by a reliable source to be misconceptions.

With no authoritative language academy, guidance on English language usage can come from many sources. This can create problems, as described by Reginald Close:

Teachers and textbook writers often invent rules which their students and readers repeat and perpetuate. These rules are usually statements about English usage which the authors imagine to be, as a rule, true. But statements of this kind are extremely difficult to formulate both simply and accurately. They are rarely altogether true; often only partially true; sometimes contradicted by usage itself. Sometimes the contrary to them is also true.

Many usage forms are commonly perceived as nonstandard or errors despite being either widely used or endorsed by authoritative descriptions.^{[a]}

Perceived violations of correct English usage elicit visceral reactions in many people, or may lead to a perception of a writer as careless, uneducated, or lacking attention to detail. For example, respondents to a 1986 BBC poll were asked to submit "the three points of grammatical usage they most disliked". Participants said their points "'made their blood boil', 'gave a pain to their ear', 'made them shudder', and 'appalled' them".

== Grammar ==
- Misconception: "A sentence must not end in a preposition."

Fowler's Modern English Usage says: "One of the most persistent myths about prepositions in English is that they properly belong before the word or words they govern and should not be placed at the end of a clause or sentence." Preposition stranding was in use long before any English speakers considered it incorrect. This idea probably began in the 17th century, owing to an essay by the poet John Dryden, and it is still taught in schools at the beginning of the 21st century. But "every major grammarian for more than a century has tried to debunk" this idea; "it's perfectly natural to put a preposition at the end of a sentence, and it has been since Anglo-Saxon times". Many examples of terminal prepositions occur in classic works of literature, including the plays of Shakespeare. The saying "This is the sort of nonsense up with which I will not put"^{[b]} satirizes the awkwardness that can result from prohibiting sentence-ending prepositions. Associated Press style and Chicago Style both allow this usage.

- Misconception: "Infinitives must not be split."

"There is no such rule" against splitting an infinitive, according to The Oxford Guide to Plain English, and it has "never been wrong to 'split' an infinitive". In some cases, it may be preferable to split an infinitive. In his grammar book A Plea for the Queen's English (1864), Henry Alford claimed that because "to" was part of the infinitive, the parts were inseparable. This was in line with a 19th-century movement among grammarians to transfer Latin rules to the English language. In Latin, infinitives are single words (e.g., amare, cantare, audire), making split infinitives impossible.

- Misconception: "Conjunctions such as 'and' or 'but' must not begin a sentence."

Those who impose this rule on themselves or their students are following a modern English "rule" that was neither used historically nor universally followed in professional writing. Jeremy Butterfield described this perceived prohibition as one of "the folk commandments of English usage". The Chicago Manual of Style says:

There is a widespread belief—one with no historical or grammatical foundation—that it is an error to begin a sentence with a conjunction such as "and", "but", or "so". In fact, a substantial percentage (often as many as 10 percent) of the sentences in first-rate writing begin with conjunctions. It has been so for centuries, and even the most conservative grammarians have followed this practice.^{[c]}

Regarding the word "and", Fowler's Modern English Usage states: "There is a persistent belief that it is improper to begin a sentence with And, but this prohibition has been cheerfully ignored by standard authors from Anglo-Saxon times onwards." Garner's Modern American Usage adds: "It is rank superstition that this coordinating conjunction cannot properly begin a sentence." The word "but" suffers from similar misconceptions. Garner says: "It is a gross canard that beginning a sentence with but is stylistically slipshod. In fact, doing so is highly desirable in any number of contexts, as many style books have said (many correctly pointing out that but is more effective than however at the beginning of a sentence)". Fowler's echoes this sentiment: "The widespread public belief that But should not be used at the beginning of a sentence seems to be unshakeable. Yet it has no foundation."

- Misconception: "The passive voice is incorrect."

It is a misconception that the passive voice is always incorrect in English. Some "writing tutors" believe that the passive voice is to be avoided in all cases, but "there are legitimate uses for the passive voice", says Paul Brians. Mignon Fogarty also points out that "passive sentences aren't incorrect" and "If you don't know who is responsible for an action, passive voice can be the best choice".^{[d]} When the active or passive voice can be used without much awkwardness, there are differing opinions about which is preferable. Bryan A. Garner notes: "Many writers talk about passive voice without knowing exactly what it is. In fact, many think that any BE-VERB signals passive voice."

Some proscriptions of passive voice stem from its use to avoid accountability or as weasel words, rather than from its supposed ungrammaticality.

- Misconception: "Litotes or double negation (sometimes called 'double negatives') are always incorrect."

Some style guides use the term double negative to refer exclusively to the nonstandard use of reinforcing negations (negative concord, which is considered standard in some other languages), e.g., using "I don't know nothing" to mean "I know nothing". But the term "double negative" can sometimes refer to the standard English constructions called litotes or nested negatives, e.g., using "He is not unhealthy" to mean "He is healthy". In some cases, nested negation is used to convey nuance, uncertainty, or the possibility of a third option other than a statement or its negation. For example, an author may write "I'm not unconvinced by his argument" to imply they find an argument persuasive, but not definitive.

Some writers suggest avoiding nested negatives as a rule of thumb for clear and concise writing. Overuse of nested negatives can result in sentences that are difficult to parse, as in the sentence "I am not sure whether it is not true to say that the Milton who once seemed not unlike a seventeenth-century Shelley had not become [...]".

== Usage ==
- Misconception: "Paragraphs must be at least three sentences long."

Richard Nordquist writes, "no rule exists regarding the number of sentences that make up a paragraph", noting that professional writers use "paragraphs as short as a single word". According to the Oxford Guide to Plain English:

If you can say what you want to say in a single sentence that lacks a direct connection with any other sentence, just stop there and go on to a new paragraph. There's no rule against it. A paragraph can be a single sentence, whether long, short, or middling.

According to the University of North Carolina at Chapel Hill's Writing Center's website, "Many students define paragraphs in terms of length: a paragraph is a group of at least five sentences, a paragraph is half a page long, etc." The website explains, "Length and appearance do not determine whether a section in a paper is a paragraph. For instance, in some styles of writing, particularly journalistic styles, a paragraph can be just one sentence long."

- Misconception: "Contractions are not appropriate in proper English."

Writers such as Shakespeare, Samuel Johnson, and others since Anglo-Saxon days have been "shrinking English". Some opinion makers in the 17th and 18th century eschewed contractions, but beginning in the 1920s, usage guides have mostly allowed them. Most writing handbooks now recommend using contractions to create more readable writing, but many schools continue to teach that contractions are prohibited in academic and formal writing, contributing to this misconception.

== Semantics ==
- Misconception: "Some commonly used words are not 'real words'."

Common examples of words described as "not real" include "funnest", "impactful", and "mentee", all of which are in common use, appear in numerous dictionaries as English words, and follow standard rules for constructing English words from morphemes. Many linguists follow a descriptive approach to language, where some usages are labeled merely nonstandard, not improper or incorrect.

- Misconception: ""Inflammable" can only mean 'flammable'." / "'Inflammable' can only mean 'not flammable'."

The word "inflammable" can be derived by two different constructions, both following standard rules of English grammar: appending the suffix -able to the word inflame creates a word meaning "able to be inflamed", while adding the prefix in- to the word flammable creates a word meaning "not flammable". Thus "inflammable" is an auto-antonym, a word that can be its own antonym, depending on context. Because of the risk of confusion, style guides sometimes recommend using the unambiguous terms "flammable" and "not flammable".

- Misconception: "It is incorrect to use 'nauseous' to refer to a person's state."

It is sometimes claimed that "nauseous" means "causing nausea" (nauseating), not suffering from it (nauseated). This prescription is contradicted by vast evidence from English usage, and Merriam-Webster finds no source for the rule before a published letter by a physician, Deborah Leary, in 1949.

- Misconception: "It is incorrect to use 'healthy' to refer to things that are good for a person's health."

It is true that the adjective "healthful" has been pushed out in favor of "healthy" in recent times. But the distinction between the words dates only to the 19th century. Before that, the words were used interchangeably; some examples date to the 16th century. The use of "healthful" in place of "healthy" is now regarded as unusual enough that it may be considered hypercorrected.

== Notes ==
a. For example, among the top ten usage "errors" submitted to the BBC was the supposed prohibition against using double negatives.
b. The Churchill Centre describes a similar version as "An invented phrase put in Churchill's mouth".
c. Chicago elaborates by noting Charles Allen Lloyd's observations on this phenomenon: "Next to the groundless notion that it is incorrect to end an English sentence with a preposition, perhaps the most wide-spread of the many false beliefs about the use of our language is the equally groundless notion that it is incorrect to begin one with 'but' or 'and'. As in the case of the superstition about the prepositional ending, no textbook supports it, but apparently about half of our teachers of English go out of their way to handicap their pupils by inculcating it. One cannot help wondering whether those who teach such a monstrous doctrine ever read any English themselves."
d. These authors are quick to point out, however, that the passive voice is not necessarily better—it's simply a myth that the passive voice is wrong. For example, Brians states that "it's true that you can make your prose more lively and readable by using the active voice much more often", and Fogarty points out that "passive sentences aren't incorrect; it's just that they often aren't the best way to phrase your thoughts".

== See also ==
- English usage controversies
- Linguistic prescription
- List of English words with disputed usage
- Split infinitive
- Folk linguistics
- Scientific writing

== Bibliography ==
- Bauer, Laurie; Trudgill, Peter, eds. (1998). Language Myths. London: Penguin Books. ISBN 978-0-14-026023-6.
- Bratcher, Dennis (3 December 2007). "The Origin of "Xmas"". CRI / Voice, Institute.
- Brians, Paul (2009). Common Errors in English Usage (2nd ed.). Wilsonville: William, James & Company.
- Burchfield, R. W., ed. (1996). Fowler's Modern English Usage. Oxford: Oxford University Press. ISBN 0-19-869126-2.
- Butterfield, Jeremy (2008). Damp Squid: The English Language Laid Bare. Oxford: Oxford University Press. ISBN 978-0-19-923906-1.
- Close, R.A. (1964). The New English Grammar: Lessons in English as a Foreign Language. Massachusetts: Harvard University Press.
- Cutts, Martin (2009). Oxford Guide to Plain English (Third ed.). Oxford: Oxford University Press. ISBN 978-0-19-955850-6.
- Bringhurst, Robert (2005). The Elements of Typographic Style. Vancouver: Hartley and Marks. ISBN 0-88179-206-3.
- The Churchill Centre and Museum at the Churchill War Rooms, London (March 2009). "Famous Quotations and Stories".
- Felici, James (24 August 2009). "To Double-Space or Not to Double-Space". CreativePro.com. Printingforless.com and CreativePro.com31 March 2010.
- Fogarty, Mignon (2008). Grammar Girl's Quick and Dirty Tips for Better Writing. New York: Holt Paperbacks. ISBN 978-0-8050-8831-1.
- Fogarty, Mignon (22 July 2010). "Active Voice Versus Passive Voice". Grammar Girl: Quick and Dirty Tips for Better Writing.
- Fogarty, Mignon (4 March 2010). "Top Ten Grammar Myths". Grammar Girl: Quick and Dirty Tips for Better Writing. Archived from the original on 13 March 2011.
- Fogarty, Mignon (2011). Grammar Girl Presents the Ultimate Writing Guide for Students. New York: Henry Holt & Company. pp. 45–46. ISBN 978-0-8050-8943-1.
- Garner, Bryan A. (2003). Garner's Modern American Usage. New York: Oxford University Press. ISBN 0-19-516191-2.
- Howard, Phillip (1984). The State of the Language: English Observed. London: Hamish Hamilton. ISBN 0-241-11346-6.
- Jury, David (2004). About Face: Reviving the Rules of Typography. Switzerland: Rotovision SA. ISBN 2-88046-798-5.
- Lloyd, Charles Allen (1938). We Who Speak English: and Our Ignorance of Our Mother Tongue. New York: Thomas Y. Crowell.
- Merriam-Webster (2011). "Irregardless". Merriam-Webster.
- Merriam-Webster (1995). Merriam Webster Dictionary of English Usage. Merriam-Webster.
- Nordquist, Richard (2011). "Top Five Phony Rules of Writing". About.com. New York Times Company. Archived from the original on 4 September 2011.
- O'Conner, Patricia T.; Kellerman, Stewart (2009). Origins of the Specious: Myths and Misconceptions of the English Language. New York: Random House. ISBN 978-1-4000-6660-5.
- O'Conner, Patricia T. (2009). Woe is I: The Grammarphobe's Guide to Better English in Plain English (Third ed.). New York: Riverhead Books. ISBN 978-1-59448-890-0.
- Pullum, Geoffrey K. (17 April 2009). "50 Years of Stupid Grammar Advice". The Chronicle Review. The Chronicle of Higher Education.
- Spencer, David (24 May 2011). "The Curious Misconception Surrounding Sentence Spacing". Type Desk. Matador. Archived from the original on 10 June 2011.
- Strizver, Ilene (2010). Type Rules!: The Designer's Guide to Professional Typography (3rd ed.). New Jersey: John Wiley & Sons. ISBN 978-0-470-54251-4.
- University of Chicago Press (2010). The Chicago Manual of Style (16th ed.). Chicago: Univ. of Chicago Press. ISBN 978-0-226-10420-1.
- University of Chicago Writing Program. "Grammar Resources". University of Chicago Writing Program. University of Chicago. Archived from the original on 26 October 2011.
- Walsh, Bill (2004). The Elephants of Style: A Trunkload of Tips on the Big Issues and Gray Areas of Contemporary American English. New York: McGraw Hill. ISBN 978-0-07-142268-0.
- The Writing Center. "Paragraph Development". University of North Carolina at Chapel Hill.
