= John Comly =

American author and educator (1773–1850)

- Born: November 19, 1773 Byberry, Philadelphia, U.S.
- Died: August 17, 1850 (aged 76) Philadelphia, U.S.
- Occupation: Author; educator; Quaker minister; lawyer
- Notable works: English Grammar Made Easy to the Teacher and Pupil

John Comly (November 19, 1773 – August 17, 1850) was an American author, educator, Quaker minister, and lawyer. He published numerous books, a portion of which pertained to grammar and spelling, wherein it is possible that he was the first to document opposition to split infinitives.

== Biography ==
John Comly was born on November 19, 1773 to Quakers Isaac and Asenath Hampton Comly, in Byberry, Philadelphia. They were farmers, which the nature of his upbringing reflects. By the age of twenty-one, he had already proved himself to be a competent surveyor. In 1780, in the journal of his formative years, he recalled the first book he had ever read:

I believe the first book put into my hands was Woolman's or Benezet's Primer.

In his 1803 work English Grammar Made Easy to the Teacher and Pupil, he expressed disapproval with respect to split infinitives—perhaps marking the advent of the sentiment in written word—although he did not refer to them as such, merely explicating the concept without attributing a label:

An adverb should not be placed between a verb of the infinitive mood and the preposition to which governs it.

Over the course of his lifetime, he, too, worked as a "farmer, an educator, a surveyor, a conveyancer." In 1815, he shifted his focus completely toward ministry and agriculture, having been a schoolmaster prior. In 1827, as leader of the Philadelphia Hicksites—a liberal school of Quakerism—he had been "proposed as a clerk but not affirmed," litigation pertaining thereto ensuing in 1831. In 1829, he visited the American South.

== Personal life ==
In 1803, he married Rebecca Budd—a fellow schoolteacher, who had hailed from Mount Holly, New Jersey—a union whence five children were born: Stacy (1805–?), Ann (1806–1872), Charles (1808–1894), Sarah (1810–1903), and Emmor (1811–1889). He was a vegetarian, a conviction that arose from an encounter wherein he had slaughtered a chicken amid his formative years—at the age of perhaps four or five—his reaction encapsulated in a retrospective reflection of his:

Horror and sorrow seized my infant soul. My heart then learned to feel tenderness toward every living thing that could feel pain.

He, too, was remarked for his "sincerity and eloquence," in addition to his repute within the Quaker community. He was also said to be of a quiet demeanor. He died on August 17, 1850, at the age of 76.
