= Grammar Girl's Quick and Dirty Tips for Better Writing =

Educational podcast

Presentation
- Hosted by: Mignon Fogarty
- Genre: society and culture podcast, educational podcast, arts podcast, literary podcast, higher education podcast, language learning podcast, children's educational podcast, children and family podcast

Production
- No. of episodes: 927

Publication
- Original release: July 30, 2006
- Ratings: 4.5/5

Grammar Girl's Quick and Dirty Tips for Better Writing is an educational podcast produced by Mignon Fogarty that was launched in July 2006 and the title of a print book by Fogarty that was released in July 2008. The podcast, which has ranked as high as #2 on iTunes, offers short one-topic English grammar lessons at no charge to subscribers hoping to improve their writing skills.

The podcast is part of the Quick and Dirty Tips podcast network operated by Macmillan Publishers. The print book offers advice similar to that found in the podcast and reached number nine on the New York Times Best Seller list for paperback advice books.

== Listenership ==
The Grammar Girl podcast had been downloaded over seven million times by December 2007. According to a Podtrac survey conducted in October 2006, approximately 50% of listeners are male and the other 50% are female. Listeners are encouraged to submit grammar questions by e-mail and voicemail. The majority of episodes are built around these submissions.

== Recognition ==
The podcast has won three awards: the 2007 Podcast Award for Best Education Podcast, the 2007 Podcast Peer Award for Favorite Audio Program, and the 2006 Podcast Peer Award for Best Education Podcast. The podcast was a finalist in the 2015 and 2017 Academy of Podcasters Awards and won the 2016 award for best education podcast.

The Grammar Girl podcast was the subject of an article in the Wall Street Journal (November 4–5, 2006), recommended by the German newspaper Bild.de (December 1, 2006), profiled on CNN.com (January 23, 2007), and positively reviewed by the Podcasting Tricks website (November 30, 2006).

In their end-of-year review, iTunes staff listed the Grammar Girl podcast as a favorite for 2006. The show was also listed as an iTunes People's Choice podcast for 2006, ranking 29th in number of new subscribers for the year. In 2013, iTunes listed Grammar Girl as one of 12 "Best Classic Podcasts".

Mignon Fogarty appeared on the March 26, 2007 episode of The Oprah Winfrey Show as a grammar expert. She was on the show to answer a viewer question about the use of possessive apostrophes. The viewer thought a previous show should have been titled "Oprah's and Gayle's Big Adventure", but Fogarty confirmed that "Oprah and Gayle's Big Adventure" was a correct use of compound possession. She went on to discuss several other common grammar errors, including "affect vs. effect" and "who vs. whom".

The Grammar Girl print book reached number nine on the August 17, 2008 New York Times Best Seller list for paperback advice books.
