= Transgressive (linguistics) =

Term of linguistic morphology

In linguistic morphology, a transgressive is a special form of verb. It expresses a concurrently proceeding or following action. It is considered to be a kind of infinitive, or participle. It is often used in Balto-Slavic languages. Syntactically it functions as an adverbial.

== Slavic languages ==
=== Czech ===
The form of the Czech transgressive (přechodník) is distinctive within the Slavic linguistic family and among converbs in general. Nowadays it is used only occasionally for artistic purposes and in set phrases and idioms. Transgressives were still used quite widely in the literary language at the beginning of the 20th century. For example, Jaroslav Hašek's The Good Soldier Švejk contains many of them.

The Czech language recognizes present and past transgressives (there are future transgressives as well). The present transgressive can express present or future action depending on the aspect of the verb from which it is derived.

==== Examples ====
- Usednuvši u okna, začala plakat. (Having sat down by the window, she began to cry.) – past transgressive
- Děti, vidouce babičku, vyběhly ven. (The children, seeing grandma, ran out.) – present transgressive
- Pořídí si psa, aby byla, přijdouc domů, přivítána. (She will get a dog, in order to be welcomed by someone when coming home.) – future transgressive
- Nedbaje svého zdraví, onemocněl. (Not having taken care of his health, he has fallen sick.) – transgressive used as a preposition
- Bůh – takříkajíc Pánu našemu. (God – being the name of our Lord.) – transgressive used as an adverb

=== Slovak ===
In Slovak, only the present transgressive form exists, and it does not inflect for gender or number.

=== Polish ===
In Polish, transgressives are usually called "adverbial participles" (imiesłowy przysłówkowe) and do not inflect for gender or number. There are two kinds of such participles: anterior (only from perfective verbs) and contemporary (only from imperfective verbs). The anterior participle (related to the Czech past transgressive) expresses an event earlier than the event described by the main clause, while the contemporary adverbial participle expresses an event simultaneous with the event described by the main clause. Nowadays, especially the anterior participle is unused in the spoken language and rare in the written language.

The contemporary adverbial participle can be derived by adding the ending -c to the third-person plural present form of an imperfective verb (or by adding the ending -ąc to the present stem of an imperfective verb):

- jeść "to eat (imperf.)" > 3pl jedzą "[they] are eating" > jedząc "(while) eating"
- nieść "to carry (imperf.)" > 3pl niosą "[they] are carrying" > niosąc "(while) carrying"
- czytać "to read (imperf.)" > 3pl czytają "[they] are reading" > czytając "(while) reading"
- kupować "to buy (imperf.)" > 3pl kupują "[they] are buying" > kupując "(while) buying"

The verb być "to be" is the only exception – its contemporary adverbial participle is będąc and corresponds to its future form będą "[they] will be" rather than to its present form są "[they] are".

The anterior adverbial participle can be derived by replacing of the ending -ł in the third-person singular masculine past form of a perfective verb with the suffix -wszy (after a vowel) or -łszy (after a consonant):

- zjeść "to eat (perf.)" > zjadł "[he] ate" > zjadłszy "having eaten"
- przynieść "to bring (perf.)" > przyniósł "[he] brought" > przyniósłszy "having brought"
- przeczytać "to read (perf.)" > przeczytał "[he] read" > przeczytawszy "having read"
- kupić "to buy (perf.)" > kupił "[he] bought" > kupiwszy "having bought"
- pchnąć "to push (perf.)" > pchnął "[he] pushed" > pchnąwszy "having pushed"

=== Serbo-Croatian ===
In all varieties of Serbo-Croatian, the transgressive forms are called "verbal adverbs" (glagolski prilozi, singular: glagolski prilog). They are common in literature and other written works, while in spoken language simple present or past tense constructions are usually used instead. They are formed similarly to the Czech and Polish transgressives. Examples are given in Gaj's Latin alphabet and Ijekavian pronunciation.

==== Examples ====
The present verbal adverb (glagolski prilog sadašnji) is formed by adding the ending -ći to the third-person plural present form of an imperfective verb:

- pjevati "to sing" (imperf.) > 3pl pjevaju "[they] sing/are singing" > pjevajući "(while) singing"
- ljubiti "to kiss" (imperf.) > 3pl ljube "[they] kiss/are kissing" > ljubeći "(while) kissing"

The past verbal adverb (glagolski prilog prošli) is formed by adding the ending -vši to the infinitive stem of a perfective verb:

- otpjevati "to sing" (perf.) > otpjeva- infinitive stem > otpjevavši "having sung"
- poljubiti "to kiss" (perf.) > poljubi- infinitive stem > poljubivši "having kissed"

Some perfective verbs have irregular past verbal adverbs, for example doći "to come (perf.) > došavši "having come".

The auxiliary verbs can be both perfective and imperfective. The verb biti "to be" has the present verbal adverb budući and the past verbal adverb bivši, and the verb htjeti "to want" has the present verbal adverb htijući or hoteći and the past verbal adverb htjevši or hotjevši.

The past verbal adverb can also be used to describe a way how something was done, for example for the verb baciti "to throw", the past verbal form bacivši can mean "by throwing", for example počinio je samoubojstvo bacivši se sa zgrade "he committed suicide by throwing himself off the building".

=== Russian ===
In Russian, the transgressive (or verbal adverb, adverbial participle) (деепричастие) is considered a participial form, which functions adverbially. It is common in written and spoken language. It indicates a secondary action, performed concurrently with the primary action. Syntactically the transgressive is felt as relating to the manner of the primary action, as adverbs of manner do.

Formation of the transgressives bears similarities to the transgressives of other Slavic languages. The transgressive can be formed from a perfective or an imperfective infinitive verb lemma. The imperfective transgressive can be in the present or past tense. The perfective transgressive is in the past. The transgressive has no other inflection (beyond the tense inflection for the imperfectives).

==== Examples ====
- Imperfective lemma прыгать ('to jump', imperfective): прыгая — 'while jumping' (present), прыгав/прыгавши — 'while jumping (in the past)' (past).
- Perfective lemma прыгнуть ('to jump', perfective): прыгнув/прыгнувши — 'having jumped' (past)

For some of the most frequent verb lemmata, formation of the transgressive exhibits some morphological variation and irregularity, with no simple rules:

- Lemma быть ('to be'): будучи — '(while) being' (present), бывши — 'having been' (past), etc.

The above transgressive forms of to be can be combined with the passive participle to form periphrastic passive transgressives, though such usage is more rare.

=== Ukrainian ===
Like all verb forms, the transgressive in Ukrainian has an aspect category: perfective and imperfective.

Perfective past tense transgressives express an additional action that occurred before or simultaneously with the main action (answers the question having done what?). For example: Закінчивши лекцію, викладач пішов на перерву. (The professor first finished giving the lecture, and only then went on a break.)

Imperfective present tense transgressives denote an additional action that occurs simultaneously with the main action (answers the question while doing what?): Сніг іде і, сяйво розсіваючи бліде, зволожує афіші і обличчя (Iryna Zhylenko). The snow is both falling and spreading pale light at the same time.

Imperfective past tense transgressives express an additional action that occurred in the past simultaneously with the main action (answers the question while having done what?): Слухавши вірші про кохання, він завжди згадував її. (He was listening and remembering at the same time.)

== Baltic languages ==
Lithuanian and Latvian have multiple transgressive forms most of which are used very actively in all types of modern speech.

=== Lithuanian ===
Lithuanian has the following transgressive forms:

==== The gerund ====
The gerund (Lithuanian: pusdalyvis), used with verbs in all tenses to render an action done by the sentence subject simultaneously with the action of the main verb:

==== Examples ====
- Dainuodamas jis nieko negirdi. – While singing, he doesn't hear anything.
- Rašydama laišką, ji visiškai pamiršo verdančią sriubą. – While writing a letter, she totally forgot about the boiling soup.

The gerund is formed by removing the infinitive ending "-ti" and adding the suffix "-dam-", as well as endings marking gender and number:

- m.sg. -damas, refl. -damasis
- f.sg. -dama, refl. -damasi
- m.pl. -dami, refl. -damiesi
- f.pl. -damos, refl. -damosi

==== Adverbial participles ====
Two adverbial participles (Lithuanian: padalyvis) out of four (present adverbial participle and past simple adverbial participle), used with verbs in all tenses to render an action of which the sentence subject is not the agent and which takes place simultaneously with the action of the main verb (present adverbial) or before it (past simple adverbial):

==== Examples ====
- Važiuojant keliu netikėtai iššoko stirna. (present adverbial) – While driving on the road, a roe suddenly jumped over.
- Premijos bus išmokėtos tik sėkmingai įvykdžius projektą. (past adverbial) – Bonuses will be paid out only having successfully carried out the project.

The adverbial participles are not conjugated and are formed by removing the ending of the respective tense and adding the suffix "-ant(is)" (present tense) or "-us(is)" (past simple tense):

- present simple: -ant, refl. -antis
- past simple: -us, refl. -usis

=== Latvian ===
Latvian has the following transgressive forms:

==== The "-dams" participle ====
The "-dams" participle (Latvian: divdabjis ar -dams), used with verbs in all tenses to render an action done by the sentence subject simultaneously with the action of the main verb:

==== Examples ====
- Dziedādams viņš neko nedzird. – While singing, he doesn't hear anything.
- Rakstīdama vēstuli, viņa pavisam aizmirsa par verdošu zupu. – While writing a letter, she totally forgot about the boiling soup.

The "-dams" participle is formed by removing the infinitive ending "-t" and adding the suffix "-dam-", as well as endings marking gender and number:

- m.sg. -dams, refl. -damies
- f.sg. -dama, refl. -damās
- m.pl. -dami, refl. -damies
- f.pl. -damas, refl. -damās

==== The "-ot" participle ====
The "-ot" participle (Latvian "divdabjis ar -ot"), used with verbs in all tenses to render an action which takes place simultaneously with the action of the main verb. Contrary to the similar form in Lithuanian, "-ot" participle can be used for secondary actions performed by the sentence subject as well (in many instances a speaker is free to choose between "-dams" and "-ot" participle):

==== Examples ====
- Dziedot viņš neko nedzird. – While singing, he doesn't hear anything (The main action and the secondary action are performed by the same agent, making the choice between "-ot" and "-dams" participles free).
- Braucot pa ceļu, pēkšņi izlēca stirna. – While driving on the road, a roe suddenly jumped over. (The secondary action is performed by a different agent, thus the usage of "-ot" participle is obligatory).

The adverbial participles are not conjugated and are formed by taking the stem of the present tense and adding the suffix "-ot" or "-oties" (for reflexive verbs).

== Other ==
=== Hungarian ===
In Hungarian, much like in Polish, transgressives are usually called "adverbial participles" ("határozói igenév"). It is a group within the category of nonfinite verbs that do not show person. It is defined as an igenév (a transitional word formed from a verb, with characteristics and behaviour of both verbs and another group) that functions with adverbal characteristics.

They are formed by adding either -va/-ve or -ván/-vén suffixes to the singular, third person verb. These two pairs distinguish two groups of these participles respectively.

Adverbial participles can either be:

- Imperfect: fut (run) – futva (running, as in "while running")
- Perfect: kilép (steps out) – kilépvén (having stepped out) (this form is rarely used in modern Hungarian)

==== Examples ====
- cipel "to carry" > cipelve "(while) carrying"
- olvas "to read" > olvasva "(while) reading"
- visel "to wear" > viselvén "having worn"
- megvesz "to buy" > megvéve "(as they were) buying"

It is not to be confused with some examples of passive voice, which can be formed by adding the -va/-ve suffixes to the verbs as well. For example: A könyvek fel lettek cipelve. (The books have been carried up.) As opposed to: A könyveket cipelve beütöttem a karom. (I hit my arm while carrying the books.)

== See also ==
- Adjectival participle
- Adverbial participle
- Converb
- Non-finite verb
- Participle
- Gerund
