= Introduction to Outer Space =

1958 American propaganda pamphlet

Introduction to Outer Space is a March 26, 1958 pamphlet about space exploration edited by the White House. At first it was a report produced by the President's Science Advisory Committee, presided by James R. Killian, in the wake of the Soviet Union's late 1957 Sputnik 1 and Sputnik 2 launches. To garner further support for the national space program, United States President Dwight D. Eisenhower, who found the report informative and interesting, decided to make it available to everybody for 15 cents. Introduction to Outer Space described the future of space exploration in simple terms.

It has been suggested that Introduction to Outer Space was the origin of the Star Trek universe phrase "Where no man has gone before", as the booklet reads on its first page:

The first of these factors is the compelling urge of man to explore and to discover, the thrust of curiosity that leads men to try to go where no one has gone before. Most of the surface of the earth has been explored and men now turn on the exploration of outer space as their next objective.
