= Dangling modifier =

Type of misplaced grammatical phrase

A dangling modifier (in some cases referred to as a dangling participle, illogical participle or hanging participle) is a type of ambiguous grammatical construct whereby a grammatical modifier could be misinterpreted as being associated with a word other than the one intended. A dangling modifier has no subject and is usually a participle. A writer may use a dangling modifier intending to modify a subject while word order may imply that the modifier describes an object, or vice versa.

An example of a dangling modifier appears in the sentence "Turning the corner, a handsome school building appeared". The modifying clause Turning the corner describes the behavior of the narrator, but the narrator is only implicit in the sentence. The sentence could be misread, with the turning action attaching either to the handsome school building or to nothing at all. As another example, in the sentence "At the age of eight, my family finally bought a dog", the modifier At the age of eight is dangling. It is intended to specify the narrator's age when the family bought the dog, but the narrator is again only implicitly a part of the sentence. It could be read as the family was eight years old when it bought the dog.

== Dangling-modifier clauses ==
As an adjunct, a modifier clause is normally at the beginning or the end of a sentence and usually attached to the subject of the main clause. However, when the subject is missing or the clause attaches itself to another object in a sentence, the clause is seemingly "hanging" on nothing or on an inappropriate noun. It thus "dangles", as in these sentences:

Ambiguous: Walking down Main Street (clause), the trees were beautiful (object). (Subject is unclear / implicit)

Unambiguous: Walking down Main Street (clause), I (subject) admired the beautiful trees (object).

Ambiguous: Reaching the station, the sun came out. (Subject is unclear: who reached the station?)

Unambiguous: As Priscilla reached the station, the sun came out.

In the first sentence, the adjunct clause may at first appear to modify "the trees", the subject of the sentence. However, it actually modifies the speaker of the sentence, who is not explicitly mentioned. In the second sentence, the adjunct may at first appear to modify "the sun", the subject of the sentence. Presumably, there is another, human subject who did reach the station as the sun was coming out, but this subject is not mentioned in the text. In both cases, whether the intended meaning is obscured or not may depend on context - if the previous sentences clearly established a subject, then it may be obvious who was walking down Main Street or reaching the station. But if left alone, they may be unclear if the reader takes the subject as an unknown observer; or misleading if a reader somehow believed the trees were walking down the street or the sun traveled to the station.

Many style guides of the 20th century consider dangling participles ungrammatical and incorrect. Strunk and White's The Elements of Style states that "A participle phrase at the beginning of a sentence must refer to the grammatical subject". The 1966 book Modern American Usage: A Guide, started by Wilson Follett and finished by others, agrees: "A participle at the head of a sentence automatically affixes itself to the subject of the following verb – in effect a requirement that the writer either make his [grammatical] subject consistent with the participle or discard the participle for some other construction". However, this prohibition has been questioned; more descriptivist authors consider that a dangling participle is only problematic when there is actual ambiguity. One of Follett's examples is "Leaping to the saddle, his horse bolted", but a reader is unlikely to be genuinely confused and think that the horse was leaping into a saddle rather than an implicit rider; The Economist questioned whether the "clumsy examples" of the style guides proved much. Many respected and successful writers have used dangling participles without confusion; one example is Virginia Woolf, whose work includes many such phrases, such as "Lying awake, the floor creaked" (in Mrs Dalloway) or "Sitting up late at night it seems strange not to have more control" (in The Waves). Shakespeare's Richard II includes a dangling modifier as well. (Note: As in a theatre, the eyes of men, After a well-graced actor leaves the stage, Are idly bent on him that enters next, Thinking his prattle to be tedious. Richard II, Act 5, Scene 2. (The men themselves think the newcomer is tedious, not the eyes.))

=== Absolute constructions ===
Dangling participles are similar to clauses in absolute constructions, but absolute constructions are considered uncontroversial and grammatical. The difference is that a participle phrase in an absolute construction is not semantically attached to any single element in the sentence. A participle phrase is intended to modify a particular noun or pronoun, but in a dangling participle, it is instead erroneously attached to a different noun or to nothing; whereas in an absolute clause, is not intended to modify any noun at all, and thus modifying nothing is the intended use. An example of an absolute construction is:

The weather being beautiful, we plan to go to the beach today.

== Non-participial modifiers ==
Non-participial modifiers that dangle can also be troublesome:

After years of being lost under a pile of dust, Walter P. Stanley, III, left, found all the old records of the Bangor Lions Club.

The above sentence from a photo caption in a newspaper suggests that it is the subject of the sentence, Walter Stanley, who was buried under a pile of dust, and not the records. It is the prepositional phrase "after years of being lost under a pile of dust" which dangles.

In the film Mary Poppins, Mr. Dawes Sr. dies of laughter after hearing the following joke:

"I know a man with a wooden leg called Smith." "What was the name of his other leg?"

In the case of this joke, the placement of the participial phrase "called Smith" implies that it is the leg that is named Smith, rather than the man. ("Called Smith" is a participial phrase, as "called" is a past participle.)

Another famous example of this humorous effect is by Groucho Marx as Captain Jeffrey T. Spaulding in the 1930 film Animal Crackers:

One morning I shot an elephant in my pajamas. How he got into my pajamas I'll never know.

Though under the most plausible interpretation of the first sentence, Captain Spaulding would have been wearing the pajamas, the line plays on the grammatical possibility that the elephant was instead.

Certain formulations can be genuinely ambiguous as to whether the subject, the direct object, or something else is the proper affix for the participle; for example, in "Having just arrived in town, the train struck Bill", did the narrator, the train, or Bill just arrive in the town?

== Modifiers reflecting the mood or attitude of the speaker ==
Participial modifiers can sometimes be intended to describe the attitude or mood of the speaker, even when the speaker is not part of the sentence. Some such modifiers are standard and are not considered dangling modifiers: "Speaking of [topic]", and "Trusting that this will put things into perspective", for example, are commonly used to transition from one topic to a related one or for adding a conclusion to a speech. An example of a contested use would be "Frankly, he is lying to you"; such usage is not uncommon by writers, but strictly speaking that sentence would be in violation of older style guide prohibitions as it is the speaker being frank, not "he" in such a sentence.

=== Usage of "hopefully" ===
Since about the 1960s, controversy has arisen over the proper usage of the adverb hopefully. Some grammarians object to constructions such as "Hopefully, the sun will be shining tomorrow". Their complaint is that the term "hopefully" is understood as the manner in which the sun will shine if read literally, with the suggested modification "I hope the sun will shine tomorrow" if it is the speaker that is full of hope. "Hopefully" used in this way is a disjunct (cf. "admittedly", "mercifully", "oddly"). Disjuncts (also called sentence adverbs) are useful in colloquial speech for the concision they permit.

No other word in English expresses that thought. In a single word we can say it is regrettable that (regrettably) or it is fortunate that (fortunately) or it is lucky that (luckily), and it would be comforting if there were such a word as hopably or, as suggested by Follett, hopingly, but there isn't. [...] In this instance nothing is to be lost – the word would not be destroyed in its primary meaning – and a useful, nay necessary term is to be gained.

What had been expressed in lengthy adverbial constructions, such as "it is regrettable that ..". or "it is fortunate that .."., had of course always been shortened to the adverbs "regrettably" or "fortunately". Bill Bryson says, "those writers who scrupulously avoid 'hopefully' in such constructions do not hesitate to use at least a dozen other words – 'apparently', 'presumably', 'happily', 'sadly', 'mercifully', 'thankfully', and so on – in precisely the same way".

Merriam-Webster gives a usage note on its entry for "hopefully"; the editors point out that the disjunct sense of the word dates to the early 18th century and has been in widespread use since at least the 1930s. Objection to this sense of the word, they state, became widespread only in the 1960s. The Merriam Webster editors maintain that this usage is "entirely standard".

There are similar complications with the term "doubtless" or "doubtlessly". "Alex doubtlessly ran out of gas" either means Alex was doubtless when he ran out of gas, or the speaker is doubtless in declaring that Alex ran out of gas.

== See also ==
- Double entendre
- Garden-path sentence
- Preposition stranding
- Syntactic ambiguity
