= Participle =

Verb form modifying a noun or noun phrase

In linguistics, a participle (from Latin participium 'a sharing, partaking'; abbr. ptcp) is a nonfinite verb form that has some of the characteristics and functions of both verbs and adjectives. More narrowly, participle has been defined as "a word derived from a verb and used as an adjective".

"Participle" is a traditional grammatical term from Greek and Latin that is widely used for corresponding verb forms in European languages and analogous forms in Sanskrit and Arabic grammar. In particular, Greek and Latin participles are inflected for gender, number and case, but also conjugated for tense and voice and can take prepositional and adverbial modifiers.

Cross-linguistically, participles may have a range of functions apart from adjectival modification. In European and Indian languages, the past participle is used to form the passive voice. In English, participles are also associated with periphrastic verb forms (continuous and perfect) and are widely used in adverbial clauses. In non-Indo-European languages, 'participle' has been applied to forms that are alternatively regarded as converbs (see Sirenik below), gerunds, gerundives, transgressives, and nominalised verbs in complement clauses. As a result, 'participles' have come to be associated with a broad variety of syntactic constructions.

== Etymology ==
The word participle comes from classical Latin participium, from particeps 'sharing, participation', because it shares certain properties of verbs, adjectives, and adverbs. The Latin grammatical term is a calque of the Greek grammatical term μετοχή : metochē, 'participation, participle'.

The linguistic term, past participle, was coined circa 1798 based on its participial form, whose morphology equates to the regular form of preterite verbs. The term, present participle, was first used c. 1864 to facilitate grammatical distinctions. Despite the taxonomical use of "past" and "present" as associated with the aforementioned participles, their respective semantic use can entail any tense, regardless of aspect, depending on how they are structurally combined.

== Forms ==
Some languages have extensive participial systems but English has only two participial forms, most commonly termed:

1. past participle, which is regularly formed with an -ed suffix (e.g. looked, ended, tutored) but has numerous irregular forms (e.g. broken, spoken, eaten); and
2. present participle, which is formed with an -ing suffix (e.g. breaking, making, understanding).

Some grammars further distinguish passive participles as often associated with passive voice versus active participles as often associated with e.g. the present progressive tense, but such linguistic distinctions are neither recognized nor employed on a universal basis.

== Types ==
Participles can be used adjectivally (i.e. without characteristics of canonical verbs) as attributive adjectives. Unlike standard verbs, participles don’t typically have objects or the usual modifiers that verbs have. However, they can be modified by adverbs such as very or slightly. The difference is illustrated by the following examples:

- The subject interesting him is Greek history.
- Greek history is an interesting subject.
- Greek history is a very interesting subject.

In the first sentence, interesting functions transitively in a non-finite sense as a participle that expresses the object him, thereby forming the grammatical equivalent of "[that is] interesting him". In the second and third sentences, interesting functions as a prepositive adjective modifying subject. An adverb (such as very or recently) or a prefix (such as un-) can preface adjectival participles: "a very frightened rabbit", "recently fallen leaves", "uninterested people".

Some languages differentiate adjectival participles and adverbial participles. An adverbial participle (or a participial phrase/clause based on such a participle) plays the role of an adverbial phrase in the sentence in which it appears, whereas an adjectival participle (or a participial phrase/clause based on one) plays the role of an adjective phrase. Such languages include Russian and other Slavic languages, Hungarian, and many Eskimo languages, such as Sirenik, which has a sophisticated participle system. Details can be found in the sections below or in the articles on the grammars of specific languages.

Grammatical descriptions vary in the way these are treated. Some descriptive grammars treat such adverbial and adjectival participles as distinct lexical categories, while others include them both in a single category of participles. Adverbial participles in certain languages may be called converbs, gerunds, or gerundives (though this is not consistent with the meanings of the terms gerund or gerundive as normally applied to English or Latin), or transgressives.

=== Tense ===
Participles are often used to form certain grammatical tenses or grammatical aspects. The two types of participle in Modern English are termed present participle and past participle, respectively (often also referred to as the -ing form and -ed/-en form). The traditional terms are misleading because the participles do not necessarily correspond to tense: the present participle is often associated with the progressive (continuous) aspect, while the past participle is linked with the perfect aspect or passive voice. See the examples below:

- They were just standing there.
- By the time you get home, I will have cleaned the house.

The first sentence is in the past tense (were), but a present participle expresses the progressive aspect (be standing). The second sentence is in the future tense (will), but a past participle is used for the perfect aspect (have cleaned).

=== Voice ===
Participles may also be identified with a particular voice: active or passive. Some languages (such as Latin and Russian) have distinct participles for active and passive uses. In English, the present participle is essentially an active participle, and the past participle has both active and passive uses.

The following examples illustrate those concepts:

- I saw John eating his dinner. (Here eating is an active present participle).
- The bus has gone. (Here gone is an active past participle).
- The window was broken with a rock. (Here broken is a passive past participle)

== Indo-European languages ==
=== Germanic languages ===
==== Early English ====
In Old English, past participles of Germanic strong verbs were marked with a ġe- prefix, a West Germanic feature still found in most strong and weak past participles in Dutch and German today, and often by a vowel change in the stem. Those of weak verbs were marked by the ending -d, with or without an epenthetic vowel before it. Modern English past participles derive from these forms (although the ġe- prefix, which became y- in Middle English, has now been lost — except in some rare dialects such as the Dorset dialect, where it takes the form of a-).

Old English present participles were marked with an ending in -ende (or -iende for verbs whose infinitives ended in -ian).

==== Middle English ====
In Middle English, the form of the present participle varied across regions: -ende (southwest, southeast, Midlands), -inde (southwest, southeast), -and (north), -inge (southeast). The last is the one that became standard, falling together with the suffix -ing used to form verbal nouns. See -ing (etymology).

==== Modern English ====
Modern English includes two traditional terms for its participles:

- The present participle, also sometimes called the active, imperfect, or progressive participle, takes the ending -ing, for example doing, seeing, working, running, breaking, understanding. It is identical in form to the verbal noun and gerund (see below). The term present participle is sometimes used to include the gerund; the term "gerund–participle" is also used to indicate the verb form.
- The past participle, also sometimes called the passive or perfect participle, is identical to the past tense form (ending in -ed) in the case of regular verbs, for example "loaded", "boiled", "mounted", but takes various forms in the case of irregular verbs, such as done, sung, written, broken, understood, put, gone, etc.

In addition, various compound participles can be formed, such as having done, being done, having been doing, having been done.

Details of participle formation can be found under English verbs and List of English irregular verbs.

Participles, or participial phrases (clauses) formed from them, are used as follows:

1. As an adjective used in an attributive sense:

- A **broken** window (i.e., one that has been broken)
- An **interesting** book (i.e., one that interests)
- An **exciting** adventure (i.e., one that excites)
- The **attached** files (i.e., those that are attached)
- A **fallen** tree (i.e., one that has fallen)
- Our **fallen** comrades (i.e., those who have fallen)

Additionally, participles that express an adjectivally attributive meaning can be affixed to form adverbs, such as interestingly and excitedly.

2. In postpositive phrases. These are often regarded as functioning as a reduced relative clause:

- A window **broken** by the wind (A window that was **broken** by the wind).
- A woman **wearing** a red hat (A woman who was **wearing** a red hat).
- The man **standing** over there is my uncle (The man who is **standing** over there is my uncle).
- We are a people **clamoring** for freedom (We are a people who are **clamoring** for freedom).

3. In an adverbial phrase. In the following, the subject is understood to be the same as that of the main clause:

- **Reviewing** her bank statement, Ann started to cry (While she reviewed her bank statement, Ann started to cry).
- **Having reviewed** the bank statement, Ann started to cry (After she reviewed her bank statement, Ann started to cry).
- He shot the man, **killing** him (He shot the man and killed him).
- **Maintained** properly, wooden buildings can last for centuries (If/when they are maintained properly, wooden buildings can last for centuries).

With a different subject, placed before the participle:

- He and I **having reconciled** our differences, the project then proceeded smoothly (Because/after he and I had reconciled our differences, the project proceeded smoothly). (This is known as the nominative absolute construction.)

More generally as a part of an adverb:

- Broadly **speaking**, the project was successful.

4. Participles are used to form periphrastic verb tenses:

The present participle forms the progressive aspect with the auxiliary verb be:

- Jim was **sleeping**.

The past participle forms the perfect aspect with the auxiliary verb have:

- The chicken has **eaten**.

5. The past participle is used to form passive voice:

- The chicken was **eaten**.

Such passive participles can appear in an adjectival phrase:

- The chicken **eaten** by the children was contaminated.

Adverbially:

- **Eaten** in this manner, the chicken presents no problem.

And in a nominative absolute construction, with a subject:

- The chicken **eaten**, we returned home.

Note that a past participle that complements a stative verb (e.g., "The files that are attached " or "Our comrades who have fallen") becomes a passive participle within a passive voice construct.

6. As a gerund. The gerund is traditionally regarded as distinct from the present participle. A gerund can function transitively (e.g., "I like eating ice cream") or intransitively (e.g., "I like swimming"). In both instances, a gerund functions nominatively rather than adjectivally or adverbially—whether as an object (e.g., "I like sleeping") or as a subject (e.g., "Sleeping is not allowed"). Although gerunds and present participles are morphologically identical, their grammatical functions differ substantially.

Sometimes their morphological similarity can create contextual ambiguity, as Noam Chomsky pointed out in his well-known example:

- **Flying** planes can be dangerous.

When the meaning is "The practice of flying a plane is dangerous," flying functions as a gerund; when the danger concerns "Planes that fly" or "Planes when they are flying" (i.e., in contrast to grounded planes), flying is being used adjectivally as a participle. For more on the distinctions between these uses of the -ing verb form, see -ing: uses.

For more details on uses of participles and other parts of verbs in English, see Uses of English verb forms, including the sections on the present participle and past participle.

The following table summarises some of the uses of participles in English:

Active participle usage versus passive participle usage
Example	Tense name	Lexical category	Voice
The **baked** bread	—N/a	past participle (prepositive); adjectival	Passive
Bread **baked** daily	—N/a	past participle (postpositive); adjectival	Passive
The **acting** president	—N/a	present participle (prepositive); adjectival	Active
The time **remaining**	—N/a	present participle (postpositive); adjectival	Active
You look **lost**	present simple	past participle; adjectival	Passive
You look **charming**	present simple	present participle; adjectival	Active
You are **lost**	present simple	past participle; adjectival	Passive
You are **losing**	present continuous	present participle; aspectual	Active
He has **finished**	present perfect	past participle; aspectual	Active
He has **been** finished	present perfect	past participle; aspectual	Passive
He has been **finished**	present perfect	past participle; adjectival	Passive
He has been **finishing**	present perfect continuous	present participle; aspectual	Active
She had **been** run	past perfect	past participle; aspectual	Passive
She had been **run**	past perfect	past participle; aspectual	Passive
She had been **running**	past perfect continuous	present participle; aspectual	Active
She had been running **ragged**	past perfect continuous	past participle; adverbial	Passive
She had been running **unwillingly**	past perfect continuous	suffixed present participle; adverbial	Passive

==== Scandinavian languages ====
In all of the Scandinavian languages the past participle has to agree with the noun to some degree. All of the Scandinavian languages have mandatory agreement with the noun in number. Nynorsk and Swedish have mandatory agreement in both number and gender. Icelandic and Faroese have agreement in number, gender and case. The verb form used for the perfect (or "supine") aspect is generally identical to the nominative neuter singular form of the past participle for all verbs. For the present participle there is no agreement.

Examples in Nynorsk:

- **Sjølvkøyrande** bilar kan vere farlege. (English: **self-driving** cars can be dangerous)
- Kyllingen vart **eten** (English: The chicken was **eaten**)
- Dyret vart **ete** (English: The deer was **eaten**)

The participles are marked in bold. The first example involves a present participle and the two latter examples involves a past participle. All present participles end with an -ande suffix.

In Norwegian, the present participle may be used to form adjectives or adverbs denoting the possibility or convenience of performing the action prescribed by the verb. For example:

- Var maten **etande**? (English: Was the food **edible**?) (or rather: Was the food **any good**?)
- Utan servo vert bilen fort **ukøyrande**. (English: Without power steering, the car soon becomes **impossible to drive**.) (Lit: un-drivable)

This construction is allowed in Nynorsk, but not in Bokmål, where suffixes like -elig or -bar are used instead.

=== Latin and Romance languages ===
==== Latin ====
Latin grammar was studied in Europe for hundreds of years, especially the handbook written by the 4th-century teacher Aelius Donatus, and it is from Latin that the name and concept of the participle derives. According to Donatus there are four participles in Latin, as follows:

- **present** participle: present stem + -ns (gen. -ntis); e.g. legēns (plural legentēs) "(while) reading"
- **perfect** participle: supine stem + -us, -a, -um; e.g. lēctus "read (by someone)"
- **future** participle: supine stem + -ūrus, -ūra, -ūrum; e.g. lēctūrus "going to read", "due to read"
- **gerundive** (sometimes considered the future passive participle): e.g. legendus "due to be read", "necessary to be read"

However, many modern Latin grammars treat the gerundive as a separate part of speech.

The perfect participle is usually passive in meaning, and thus mainly formed from transitive verbs, for example frāctus "broken", missus "sent (by someone)". However, certain verbs (called deponent verbs) have a perfect participle in an active sense, e.g. profectus "having set out", hortātus "having encouraged", etc. The present and future participles are always active, the gerundive usually passive.

Because a participle is an adjective as well as a verb, just like any other Latin adjective its ending changes according to the noun it describes. So when the noun is masculine, the participle must be masculine; when the noun is in the accusative (object) case, the participle is also in the accusative case; when the noun has plural endings, the participle also has plural endings. Thus a simple participle such as frāctus "broken" can change to frācta, frāctum, frāctī, frāctō and so on, according to its gender, number, and case.

A participle can have a descriptive meaning like an adjective, or a more dynamic meaning like a verb. Thus in the following sentence the participle strīctō "drawn" is better taken as describing an action ("he drew his sword" or "after drawing his sword") rather than as describing the sword ("with a drawn sword"):

- **Strīctō** gladiō ad **dormientem** Lucrētiam vēnit.
  "With **drawn** sword he came to the **sleeping** Lucretia."

The dynamic, verbal meaning is more common, and Latin often uses a participle where English might use a simple verb.

The present participle often describes the circumstances attending the main verb. A typical example is:

- Balbus ad mē vēnit **currēns**.
  "Balbus came to me **running**."

Both the future and the perfect participle (but not the present participle) can be used with various tenses of the verb esse "to be" to make a compound tense such as the future-in-the-past or the perfect passive:

- Eō diē Rōmam **ventūrus erat**.
  "On that day **he was going to return** to Rome."
- **Occīsus est** ā Thēbānīs.
  "**He was killed** by the Thebans."

The perfect and future participles can also be used, with or without the verb esse "to be", in indirect speech clauses:

- (Dīxit eōs) locum facile **inventūrōs** (esse).
  "He said that they were easily **going to find** the place / He said that they **would find** the place easily."

For uses of the gerundive, see Latin syntax § The gerundive.

==== French ====
There are two basic participles:

- Present active participle: formed by dropping the -ons of the nous form of the present tense of a verb (except with être and avoir) and then adding ant: marchant "walking", étant "being", ayant "having".
- Past participle: formation varies according to verb group: vendu "sold", mis "placed", marché "walked", été "been", and fait "done". The sense of the past participle is passive as an adjective and in most verbal constructions with être, but active in verbal constructions with avoir, in reflexive constructions, and with some intransitive verbs.

Compound participles are possible:

- Present perfect participle: ayant appelé "having called", étant mort "being dead"
- Passive perfect participle: étant vendu "being sold, having been sold"

Usage:

- **Present participles** are used as qualifiers as in un insecte **volant** ('a flying insect') and in some other contexts. They are never used to form tenses.
- **Past participles** are used as qualifiers for nouns: la table **cassée** ('the broken table'); to form compound tenses such as the perfect Vous avez **dit** ('you have said') and to form the passive voice: il a été **tué** ('he/it has been killed').

==== Spanish ====
In Spanish, the so-called present or active participle (participio activo or participio de presente) of a verb is traditionally formed with one of the suffixes -ante, -ente or -iente, but modern grammar does not consider it a true participle, as such forms usually have the meaning of simple adjectives or nouns: e.g. amante "loving" or "lover", viviente "living" or "live".

The past participle (participio pasado or participio pasivo) is regularly formed with one of the suffixes -ado or -ido (-ado for verbs ending in -ar and -ido for verbs ending in -er or -ir; but some verbs have an irregular form ending in -to (e.g. escrito, visto, puesto), or -cho (e.g. dicho, hecho). The past participle is used generally as an adjective referring to a finished action, in which case its ending changes according to gender and number. At other times is used to form compound tenses: the present perfect, past perfect (sometimes referred to as the pluscuamperfecto), and the future perfect, in which case it is indeclinable. Some examples:

As an adjective (note how escritas agrees in gender with the noun, las cartas):

- las cartas escritas "the written letters"

To form compound tenses:

- Ha escrito una carta. "She (he, it) has written a letter."
- Había escrito una carta. "She (he, it) had written a letter."
- Habrá escrito una carta. "She (he, it) will have written a letter."

=== Hellenic languages ===
==== Ancient Greek ====
The Ancient Greek participle shares in the properties of adjectives and verbs. Like an adjective, it changes form for gender, case, and number. Like a verb, it has tense and voice, is modified by adverbs, and can take verb arguments, including an object. Participles are quite numerous in Ancient Greek: a non-defective verb has as many as ten participles.

There is a form of the participle for every combination of aspect (present, aorist, perfect, future) and voice (active, middle, passive). All participles are based on their finite forms. Here are the masculine nominative singular forms for a thematic and an athematic verb:

λῡ́ω lū́ō "I release"	active	middle	passive
present	λῡ́ων lū́ōn	λῡόμενος lūómenos	
aorist	λῡ́σᾱς lū́sās	λῡσάμενος lūsámenos	λυθείς lutheís
future	λῡ́σων lū́sōn	λῡσόμενος lūsómenos	λυθησόμενος luthēsómenos
perfect	λελυκώς lelukṓs	λελυμένος leluménos	

τίθημι títhēmi "I put"	active	middle	passive
present	τιθείς titheís	τιθέμενος tithémenos	
aorist	θείς theís	θέμενος thémenos	τεθείς tetheís
future	θήσων thḗsōn	θησόμενος thēsómenos	τεθησόμενος tethēsómenos
perfect	τεθηκώς tethēkṓs	τεθειμένος tetheiménos	

Like an adjective, it can modify a noun, and can be used to embed one thought into another.

πολλὰ καὶ φύσει καὶ ἐπιστήμῃ δεῖ τὸν εὖ στρατηγήσοντα ἔχειν
pollà kaì phúsei kaì epistḗmēi deî tòn eû stratēgḗsonta ékhein
"he who intends to be a good general must have a great deal of ability and knowledge"

In the example, the participial phrase τὸν εὖ στρατηγήσοντα tòn eû stratēgḗsonta, literally "the one going to be a good general", is used to embed the idea εὖ στρατηγήσει eû stratēgḗsei "he will be a good general" within the main verb.

The participle is very widely used in Ancient Greek, especially in prose.

=== Indo-Aryan languages ===
==== Hindi and Urdu ====
There are two types of participles in Hindi and Urdu (called together Hindustani), aspectual participles which mark the aspect and non-aspectual participles which do not mark verbal aspect. The table below mentions the different participles present in Hindustani, ɸ denotes the verb root. The aspectual participles can take a few other copulas after them besides the verb honā "to be". Those copular verbs are rêhna "to stay", ānā "to come", jānā "to go".

**Aspectual participles**
Participles				Example baiṭhnā / बैठना / بیٹھنا / to sit		Translation
Declinable		Singular	Plural	Singular	Plural	Translation
**Habitual**	♂	ɸ-tā	ɸ-tē	बैठता بیٹھتا baiṭhtā	बैठते بیٹھتے baithtē	sits, used to sit
**Habitual**	♀	ɸ-tī	ɸ-tīm̥	बैठती بیٹھتی baiṭhtī	बैठतीं بیٹھتیں baiṭhtīm̥	sits, used to sit
**Perfective**	♂	ɸ-(y)ā	ɸ-(y)ē	बैठा بیٹھا baiṭhā	बैठे بیٹھے baiṭhē	sat
**Perfective**	♀	ɸ-(y)ī	ɸ-(y)īm̥	बैठी بیٹھی baiṭhī	बैठीं بیٹھیں baiṭhīm̥	sat
**Progressive^{1}**	♂	ɸ + rahā	ɸ + rahē	बैठ रहा بیٹھ رہا baiṭh rahā	बैठ रहे بیٹھ رہے baiṭh rahē	(in the process of) sitting
**Progressive^{1}**	♀	ɸ + rahī	ɸ + rahīm̥	बैठ रही بیٹھ رہی baiṭh rahī	बैठ रहीं بیٹھ رہیں baiṭh rahīm̥	(in the process of) sitting
**Perfective** **Adjectival^{2}**	♂	ɸ-(y)ā huā	ɸ-(y)ē huē	बैठा हुआ بیٹھاہوا baiṭhā huā	बैठे हुए بیٹھےہوئے baiṭhē huē	sitting
**Perfective** **Adjectival^{2}**	♀	ɸ-(y)ī huī	ɸ-(y)ī huīm̥	बैठी हुई بیٹھیہی baiṭhī huī	बैठी हुईं بیٹھی ہوئیں baiṭhī huīm̥	sitting
**Imperfective** **Adjectival^{2}**	♂	ɸ-tā huā	ɸ-tē huē	बैठता हुआ بیٹھتا ہوا baiṭhtā huā	बैठते हुए بیٹھتے ہوئے baiṭhtē huē	(in the process of) sitting
**Imperfective** **Adjectival^{2}**	♀	ɸ-tī huī	ɸ-tī huīm̥	बैठती हुई بیٹھتی ہی baiṭhtī huī	बैठती हुईं بیٹھتی ہوئیں baiṭhtī huīm̥	(in the process of) sitting
Indeclinable						
Imperfective **Progressive**		ɸ-tē-ɸ-tē		बैठते-बैठते بیٹھتے - بیٹھتے baiṭhtē-baiṭhtē		while (in the process of) sitting
Perfective Progressive		ɸ-ē-ɸ-ē		बैठे-बैठे بیٹھے- بیٹھے baiṭhē-baiṭhē		while (already) sitting

**Non-aspectual Participles**
Participles				Example baiṭhnā / बैठना / بیٹھنا / to sit		Translation
Declinable		Singular	Plural	Singular	Plural	Translation
**Infinitive**	♂	ɸ-nā	ɸ-nē	बैठना بیٹھنا baiṭhnā	बैठने بیٹھنے baiṭhnē	to sit
**Infinitive**	♀	ɸ-nī	ɸ-nīm̥	बैठनी بیتھنی baiṭhnī	बैठनीं بیٹھنیں baiṭhnīm̥	to sit
**Prospective** & **Agentive**	♂	ɸ-nēvālā	ɸ-nēvālē	बैठनेवाला بیٹھنولا baiṭhnēvālā	बैठनेवाले بیٹھنوالے baiṭhnēvālē	(prospective) going to sit (agentive) a person who sits [sit-er]
**Prospective** & **Agentive**	♀	ɸ-nēvālī	ɸ-nēvālīm̥	बैठनेवाली بیٹھنوالی baiṭhnēvālī	बैठनेवालीं بیٹھنوالیں baiṭhnēvālīm̥	(prospective) going to sit (agentive) a person who sits [sit-er]
Indeclinable						
**Oblique** **Infinitive**		ɸ-nē		बैठने بیٹھنے baiṭhnē		to sit, sitting
**Conjunctive**		ɸ-kē, ɸ-kar		बैठके, बैठकर بیٹھکے ، بیٹھکر baiṭhkē, baiṭhkar		having done sitting, by sitting

**^{1}** The progressive aspect marking participles rahā, rahē, rahī, and rahīm̥ are shortened to rā, rē, rī, and rīm̥ respectively in colloquial speech.
**^{2}** The periphrastic adjectival marker huā, huē, huī, and huīm̥ are shortened to wā, wē, wī, and wīm̥ respectively in colloquial speech.

==== Sanskrit ====
Much like Ancient Greek, Sanskrit has a wide array of participles.

=== Celtic languages ===
==== Cornish ====
In Cornish, an equivalent present participle construction to English is formed by using ow (owth before vowels) with a verbal noun, e.g. Yma an den ow hwerthin ("The man is laughing"), and den ow hwerthin ("a laughing man"). Like Breton but unlike Welsh, Cornish also has verbal adjectives which are used similarly to English past participles, e.g. dehen molys ("clotted cream"), from the verbal noun mola "to clot".

==== Welsh ====
In Welsh, the effect of a participle in the active voice is constructed by yn followed by the verb-noun (for the present participle) and wedi followed by the verb-noun (for the past participle). There is no mutation in either case. In the passive voice, participles are usually replaced by a compound phrase such as wedi cael ei/eu ("having got his/her/their ...ing") in modern Welsh and by the impersonal form in literary Welsh.

=== Slavic languages ===
==== Polish ====
The Polish word for participle is imiesłów (pl.: imiesłowy). There are four types of imiesłowy in two classes:

Adjectival participle (imiesłów przymiotnikowy):

- active adjectival participle (imiesłów przymiotnikowy czynny): robiący – "doing", "one who does"
- passive adjectival participle (imiesłów przymiotnikowy bierny): robiony – "being done" (can only be formed off transitive verbs)

Adverbial participle (imiesłów przysłówkowy):

- present adverbial participle (imiesłów przysłówkowy współczesny): robiąc – "doing", "while doing"
- perfect adverbial participle (imiesłów przysłówkowy uprzedni): zrobiwszy – "having done" (formed in virtually all cases off verbs in their perfective forms, here denoted by the prefix z-)

Due to the distinction between adjectival and adverbial participles, in Polish it is practically impossible to make a dangling participle in the classical English meaning of the term. For instance, in the sentence:

- I found them hiding in the closet.

it is unclear whether "I" or "they" were hiding in the closet. In Polish there is a clear distinction:

- Znalazłem ich, chowając się w szafie. – chowając is a present adverbial participle agreeing grammatically with the subject ("I")
- Znalazłem ich chowających się w szafie. – chowających is an active adjectival participle agreeing grammatically with the object ("them")

==== Russian ====
Verb: слышать [ˈsɫɨ.ʂɐtʲ] (to hear, imperfective aspect)

- Present active: слышащий [ˈsɫɨ.ʂɐ.ɕːɪj] "hearing", "who hears"
- Present passive: слышимый [ˈsɫɨ.ʂɨ̞.mɨ̞j] "being heard", "that is heard", "audible"
- Past active: слышавший [ˈsɫɨ.ʂɐf.ʂɨ̞j] "who heard", "who was hearing"
- Past passive: слышанный [ˈsɫɨ.ʂɐn.nɨ̞j] "that was heard", "that was being heard"
- Adverbial present active: слыша [ˈsɫɨ.ʂɐ] "(while) hearing"
- Adverbial past active: слышав [ˈsɫɨ.ʂɐf] "(while) hearing" (used mostly in the negative in the modern language, e.g. не слышав "without ever hearing")

Verb: услышать [ʊˈsɫɨ.ʂɐtʲ] (to hear, perfective aspect)

- Past active: услышавший [ʊˈsɫɨ.ʂɐf.ʂɨ̞j] "who has heard"
- Past passive: услышанный [ʊˈsɫɨ.ʂɐn.nɨ̞j] "that has been heard", "who has been heard"
- Adverbial past active: услышав [ʊˈsɫɨ.ʂɐf] "having heard", "after hearing"

Future participles formed from perfective verbs are not considered a part of standard language.

==== Bulgarian ====
Participles are adjectives formed from verbs. There are various kinds:

Verb: правя [pravja] (to do, imperfective aspect):

- Present active: правещ [pravešt]
- Past active aorist: правил [pravil]
- Past active imperfect: правел [pravel] (only used in verbal constructions)
- Past passive: правен [praven]
- Adverbial present active: правейки [pravejki]

Verb: направя [napravja] (to do, perfective aspect):

- Past active aorist: направил [napravil]
- Past active imperfect: направел [napravel] (only used in verbal constructions)
- Past passive: направен [napraven]

==== Macedonian ====
Macedonian has completely lost or transformed the participles of Common Slavic, unlike the other Slavic languages. The following points may be noted:

- present active participle: this has transformed into a verbal adverb;
- present passive participle: there are some isolated cases or remnants of the present passive participle, such as the word лаком [lakom] (greedy);
- past active participle: there is only one remnant of the past active participle, which is the word бивш [bivš] (former). However, this word is often replaced with the word поранешен [poranešen] (former);
- past passive participle: this has been transformed into a verbal adjective (it behaves like a normal adjective);
- resultative participle: this has transformed into a verbal l-form (глаголска л-форма). It is not a participle since it does not function attributively.

=== Baltic languages ===
==== Lithuanian ====
Among Indo-European languages, the Lithuanian language is unique for having 14 different participial forms of the verb, which can be grouped into five when accounting for inflection by tense. Some of these are also inflected by gender and case. For example, the verb eiti ("to go, to walk") has the active participle forms einąs/einantis ("going, walking", present tense), ėjęs (past tense), eisiąs (future tense), eidavęs (past frequentative tense), the passive participle forms einamas ("being walked", present tense), eitas ("walked" past tense), eisimas (future tense), the adverbial participles einant ("while [he, different subject] is walking" present tense), ėjus (past tense), eisiant (future tense), eidavus (past frequentative tense), the semi-participle eidamas ("while [he, the same subject] is going, walking") and the participle of necessity eitinas ("what needs to be walked"). The active and passive participles and the semi-participles are inflected by gender, and the active, passive and necessity participles are inflected by case.

== Semitic languages ==
=== Arabic ===
The Arabic verb has two participles: an active participle (ʾism al-fāʿil اسم الفاعل) and a passive participle (ʾism al-mafʿūl اسم المفعول), and the form of the participle is predictable by inspection of the dictionary form of the verb. These participles are inflected for gender, number and case, but not person. Arabic participles are employed syntactically in a variety of ways: as nouns, as adjectives or even as verbs. Their uses vary across varieties of Arabic. In general the active participle describes a property of the syntactic subject of the verb from which it derives, whilst the passive participles describes the object. For example, from the verb كتب kataba, the active participle is kātib كاتب and the passive participle is maktūb مكتوب. Roughly these translate to "writing" and "written" respectively. However, they have different, derived lexical uses. كاتب kātib is further lexicalized as "writer", "author" and مكتوب maktūb as "letter".

In Classical Arabic, the participles do not participate in verbal constructions with auxiliaries the same way as their English counterparts and rarely take on a verbal meaning in a sentence (a notable exception being participles derived from motion verbs as well as participles in Qur'anic Arabic). In certain dialects of Arabic, however, it is much more common for the participles, especially the active participle, to have verbal force in the sentence. For example, in dialects of the Levant, the active participle is a structure that describes the state of the syntactic subject after the action of the verb from which it derives has taken place. ʼĀkil, the active participle of ʼakala ("to eat"), describes one's state after having eaten something. Therefore, it can be used in analogous way to the English present perfect (for example, ʼAnā ʼākil انا آكل meaning "I have eaten", "I have just eaten" or "I have already eaten"). Other verbs, such as rāḥa راح ("to go") give a participle (rāyiḥ رايح), which has a progressive ("is going…") meaning. The exact tense or continuity of the participles is, therefore, determined by the nature of the specific verb (especially its lexical aspect and its transitivity) and the syntactic/semantic context of the utterance. What ties them all together is that they describe the subject of the verb from which they derive. The passive participles in certain dialects can be used as a sort of passive voice, but more often than not, they are used in their various lexicalized senses as adjectives or nouns.

=== Hebrew ===
Like Arabic, Hebrew has two types of participles (בינוני bênônî): an active participle (בינוני פועל bênônî pô'ēl) and a passive participle (בינוני פעול bênônî pā'ûl). These participles are inflected for gender and number. The active participle takes a variety of syntactic roles, such as a verb in present tense, a noun, and an adjective.

Hebrew has a syntactic construction of the verb "to be" (הָיָה, hayá) in the past tense, and the active participle that cognates to the past progressive tense in English. For example, the word עבדתי avádti means "I worked", and הייתי עובד hayíti ovéd means "I was working". Another use of this syntactic structure is equivalent to "used to" in English. For example, דויד בילדותו היה גר בארצות הברית davíd b'yaldutó hayá gar b'arcót habrít (David in his childhood used to live in the United States).

== Finno-Ugric languages ==
=== Finnish ===
Finnish uses six participles (partisiippi) to convey different meanings. Below is a table displaying the declension of the participles of the verb tappaa (to kill).

Finnish Participles
	Active	Passive
Present	tappava	tapettava
Past	tappanut	tapettu

Agent	tappama-
Negative	tappamaton

The participles work in the following way:

tappava	Present active participle: Conveys an ongoing action. Used to omit the use of the relative pronoun who, which or that. Tappava means "killing" as in "killing machine". In other words, machine that kills. It can also work as the subject of the sentence. In other words, tappava can mean "the one who kills" or "he who kills". Tappava on... = He who kills is...
tapettava	Present passive participle: Conveys possibility and obligation. Possibility as in -able (killable) and obligation as in something that has to be killed. Tapettava mies can mean both "the killable man" (possibility) and "the man who has to be killed" (obligation).
tappanut	Past active participle: Used with the verb olla (to be) to construct the perfect and the past perfect tenses. In English the verb "to have" is used to form the perfect and past perfect tense (I have/had killed), in Finnish the verb "to be" is used instead (minä olen/olin tappanut). Just like the present active participle, it can also be used as the subject in a sentence, except it conveys the meaning in the past tense. In other words, tappanut can mean "the one who killed" or "he who killed". Tappanut on... = He who killed is...
tapettu	Past passive participle: A concluded action. Tapettu mies = the killed man.
tappama-	Agent participle: Always used with a possessive suffix. It is used to convey the meaning of the word "by" in English, since there is no word for "by" in Finnish. Hänen tappamansa mies = The man killed by him. The tense of the translation depends on the context.
tappamaton	Negative participle: Used to convey impossibility (unkillable) and undoneness (not killed). Tappamaton mies means both "unkillable man" and "man (who is) not killed".

Each of the participles can be used as adjectives and so some of them can be turned into nouns.

Finnish (adjective)	tappava	tapettava	tappamaton
English (adjective)	killing	killable	unkillable (possibility) or not killed (undoneness)
Finnish (noun)	tappavuus	tapettavuus	tappamattomuus
English (noun)	killingness	killability	unkillability (possibility) or lack of killing (undoneness)

=== Hungarian ===
Hungarian uses adjectival and adverbial participles.

Adjectival participles (melléknévi igenév) can be one of these three types:

- Present (active): olvas (read) – olvasó (reading), él (live) – élő (living)
- Past (usually passive): zár (close) – zárt (closed)
- Future (has a modal meaning): olvas (read) – olvasandó (to be read), fizet (pay) – fizetendő (to be paid)

Adverbial participles (határozói igenév) can be:

- Imperfect: siet (hurry) – sietve (hurrying, i.e. in a hurrying manner)
- Perfect: bemegy (go in) – bemenvén (having gone in) (this form is rarely used in modern Hungarian)

In Hungarian grammar, the infinitive is also considered a kind of participle, the noun participle (főnévi igenév).

== Turkic languages ==
=== Turkish ===
Participles are called sıfat-fiil (lit. 'adjective-verb') or ortaç in Turkish.

Turkish participles consist of a verb stem and a suffix. Some participles may be conjugated, but some may not. Participles always precede the noun they are defining, unlike in English.

Participle suffixes, like many other suffixes in Turkish, change according to the vowel harmony and sandhi.

There are eight types of participle suffixes; -en, -esi, -mez, -ar, -di(k/ği), -ecek and -miş

A mnemonic for the eight types is taught in Turkish schools: Anası mezar dikecekmiş, which includes the sound of each participial suffix in a coherent sentence meaning "his/her mother is allegedly going to plant (i.e. erect) a grave(stone)".

== Eskimo–Aleut languages ==
=== Sirenik ===
Sirenik, an extinct Eskimo–Aleut language, had separate sets of adverbial participles and adjectival participles. Unlike in English, adverbial participles were conjugated to reflect the person and number of their implicit subjects; hence, an adverbial participle could replace a clause in the English sentence "If I were a marksman, I would kill walruses" since the subject was implied by the conjugation.

== Constructed languages ==
=== Esperanto ===
Esperanto has six different participle conjugations; active and passive for past, present and future. The participles are formed as follows:

	Past	Present	Future
Active	-inta	-anta	-onta
Passive	-ita	-ata	-ota

For example, a falonta botelo is a bottle that will fall or is about to fall. A falanta botelo is one that is falling through the air. After it hits the floor, it is a falinta botelo. These examples use the active participles, but the usage of the passive participles is similar. A cake that is going to be divided is a dividota kuko. When it is in the process of being divided, it is a dividata kuko. Having been cut, it is now a dividita kuko.

These participles can be used in conjunction with the verb to be, esti, forming 18 compound tenses (9 active and 9 passive). However, this soon becomes complicated and often unnecessary, and is only frequently used when rigorous translation of English is required. An example of this would be la knabo estos instruita, or, 'the boy will have been taught'. This example sentence is then in the future anterior.

When the suffix -o is used, instead of -a, then the participle refers to a person. A manĝanto is someone who is eating. A manĝinto is someone who ate. A manĝonto is someone who will eat. Also, a manĝito is someone who was eaten, a manĝato is someone who is being eaten, and a manĝoto is someone who will be eaten.

These rules hold true for all transitive verbs. Since copular and intransitive verbs do not have passive voice, their participle forms can only be active.

An informal and unofficial addition to these six are the participles for conditional forms, which use -unt- and -ut-. For example, parolunto refers to someone who would speak (or would have spoken), and a leguta libro is a book that would be read (or have been read). These unofficial participle forms are however very rarely used in practice.

== See also ==
- Attributive verb
- Gerund
- Grammar
- Hanging participle
- Nonfinite verb
- Transgressive (linguistics)
- Converb
