= Preposition stranding =

Syntactical occurrence

Preposition stranding or p-stranding is the syntactic construction in which a so-called stranded, hanging, or dangling preposition occurs somewhere other than immediately before its corresponding object; for example, at the end of a sentence. The term preposition stranding was coined in 1964, predated by stranded preposition in 1949. Linguists had previously identified such a construction as a sentence-terminal preposition or as a preposition at the end.

Preposition stranding is found in English and other Germanic languages, as well as in Vata and Gbadi (languages in the Niger–Congo family), and certain dialects of French spoken in North America.

P-stranding occurs in various syntactic contexts, including passive voice, wh-movement, and sluicing.

== Wh-movement and P-stranding ==
Wh-movement—which involves wh-words like who, what, when, where, why and how—is a syntactic dependency between a sentence-initial wh-word and the gap that it is associated with. Wh-movement can lead to P-stranding if the object of the preposition is moved to sentence-initial position, and the preposition is left behind. P-stranding from wh-movement is observed in English and Scandinavian languages. The more common alternative is called pied piping, a rule that prohibits separating a preposition from its object, for instances in Serbo-Croatian and Arabic languages. English and Dutch use both rules, providing the option of two constructions in these situations.

=== Preposition stranding allowed under wh-movement ===
==== In English ====
An open interrogative often takes the form of a wh- question (beginning with a word like what or who).

P-stranding in English allows the separation of the preposition from its object, while pied piping allows carrying the preposition along with the wh- object. From the examples below, we can see the two options.

- Which town did you come from?
  - From which town did you come?
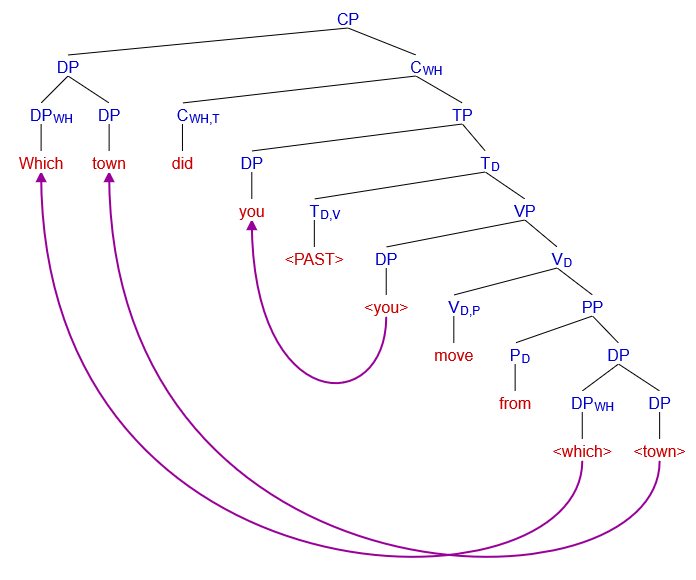
- English allows prepositional stranding under regular wh-movement.
  What are you talking about? (Note: In transformational approaches to syntax, it is commonly assumed that the movement of a constituent out of a phrase leaves a silent trace, in this case following the preposition: What_{i} are you talking about ____{i}? This bed looks as if it _{i} has been slept in ____{i}. This is the book_{i} that_{i} I told you about ____{i}.)
  - About what are you talking?

==== In Danish ====
P-stranding in Danish is banned only if the wh-word is referring to nominative cases. "Peter has spoken with <whom>", the wh-word <whom> is the accusative case. Therefore, p-stranding is allowed.

Hvem har Peter snakket med?
whom has Peter speak.PP with
'Whom has Peter spoken with?'

==== In Dutch ====
- Directional constructions

Welk bos_{i} liep hij ____{i} in?
which forest_{i} walked he ____{i} into?
'What forest did he walk into?'

- R-pronouns

Waar praatten wij over?
where talked we about?
'What did we talk about?'

==== In French ====
- Standard French requires
  - Pour qui est-ce que tu as fait le gâteau?
  - For whom did you bake the cake?
- Some dialects, such as Prince Edward Island French, permit

Qui ce-que t’as fait le gâteau pour?
who that 2SG.have made the cake for
'Who did you make the cake for?'

=== Preposition stranding disallowed under wh-movement ===
==== In Greek ====
Wh-movement in Greek states that the extracted PP must be in Spec-CP, which means the PP (me) needs to move with the wh-word (Pjon). It can thus be seen that Greek allows pied piping in wh-movement but not prepositional stranding (* indicates ungrammaticality).

*Pjon milise me?
who she.speak.PAST with
'Who did she speak with?'

==== In Spanish ====
Pied-piping is the only grammatical option in Spanish to construct oblique relative clauses. Since pied-piping is the opposite of p-stranding, p-stranding in Spanish is not possible (* indicates ungrammaticality).

*Qué chica ha hablado Peter con?
which girl.SG has talk.PP Peter with
'Who has Peter talked with?'

==== In Arabic ====
===== Emirati Arabic (EA) =====
P-stranding in EA is possible only by using which-NPs that strand prepositions and follow them with IP-deletion.

ʔaj Mʊkaan laag-et John fi?
which place met-2MS John at
'Which place did you meet John at?'

The preposition (fi) should be moved together with the wh-word (ʔaj) to make this sentence grammatical.

It should be:

f-ʔaj Mʊkaan laag-et John?
at-which place met-2MS John
'At which place did you meet John at?

===== Libyan Arabic (LA) =====
P-stranding in wh-movement sentences is normally banned in LA. However, a recent study found that a preposition seems to be stranded in a resumptive wh-question.

man Ali tekəllem mʕa?
who Ali talked.3MS with
'Who did Ali talk with?'

== Sluicing and p-stranding ==
Sluicing is a specific type of ellipsis that involves wh-phrases. In sluicing, the wh-phrase is stranded while the sentential portion of the constituent question is deleted. The preposition is stranded inside the constituent questions before sluicing. Some languages allow prepositional stranding under sluicing, while other languages ban it. The theory of preposition stranding generalization (PSG) suggests that if a language allows preposition stranding under wh-movement, that language will also allow preposition stranding under sluicing. PSG is not obeyed universally; examples of the banning of p-stranding under sluicing are provided below.

=== Preposition stranding under sluicing ===
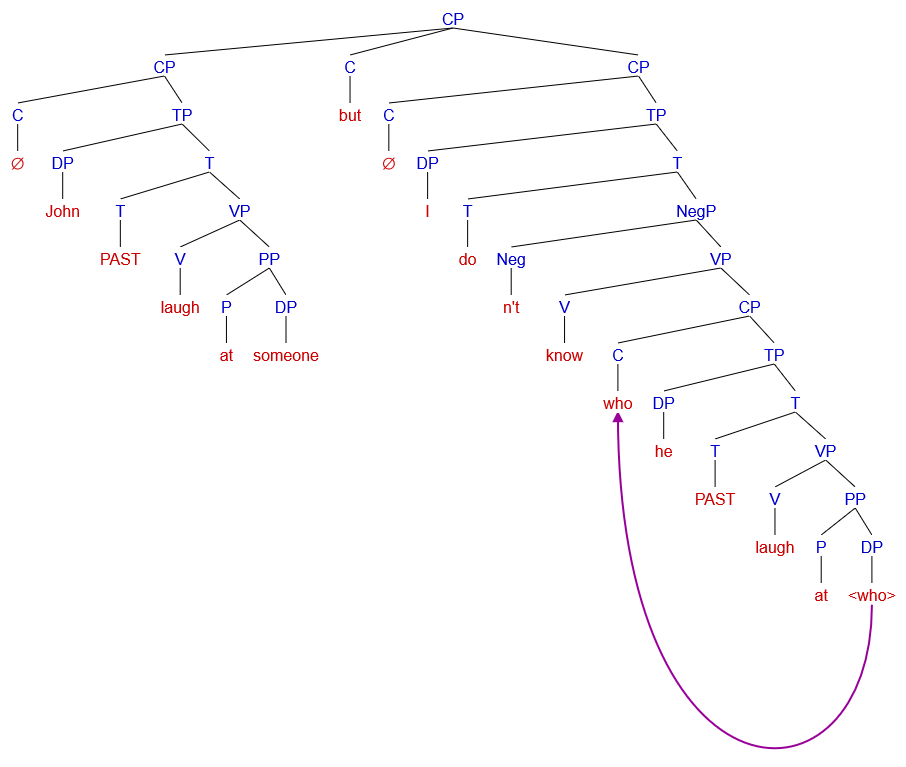
English allows prepositional stranding under sluicing.

==== In English ====
Prepositional stranding under sluicing is allowed in English because prepositional phrases are not islands in English.

- John laughed at someone, but I don't know whom ~~he laughed at~~.

==== In Danish ====
Peter har snakket med en eller anden, men jeg ved ikke hvem ~~Peter~~ ~~har~~ ~~snakket~~ ~~med~~.
Peter has talk.PP with one or another but I know.PRES not who ~~Peter~~ ~~has~~ ~~talk.PP~~ ~~with~~
'Peter was talking with someone, but I don't know who.'

==== In Spanish ====
Juan ha hablado con una chica pero no sé cuál ~~Juan~~ ~~ha~~ ~~hablado~~ ~~con~~.
Juan has talk.PP with a girl but not know which ~~Juan~~ ~~has~~ ~~talk.PP~~ ~~with~~
'Juan talked with a girl, but I don't know which.'

==== In Arabic ====
===== Emirati Arabic =====
John ʃərab gahwa. wijja sˤadiq, bəs maa ʕərf ʔaj sˤadiq ~~John~~ ~~ʃərab~~ ~~gahwa~~ ~~wijja~~.
John drank coffee with friend but not 1.know which friend ~~John~~ ~~drank~~ ~~coffee~~ ~~with~~
'John drank coffee with a friend, but I don't know which friend.'

===== Libyan Arabic =====
Ali tekəllem mʕa waħed lakin ma-ʕrafna-š man (hu) ~~illi~~ ~~Ali~~ ~~tekəllem~~ ~~mʕa-ah~~.
Ali talked.3MS with someone but NEG-knew.1P-NEG who (PN.he) ~~that~~ ~~Ali~~ ~~talked.3MS~~ ~~with-him~~
'Ali talked with someone, but we didn't know who.'

== P-stranding in other situations ==
=== Directional constructions ===
==== In Dutch ====
A number of common Dutch adpositions can be used either prepositionally or postpositionally, with a slight change in possible meanings. For example, Dutch in can mean either in or into when used prepositionally, but only mean into when used postpositionally. When postpositions, such adpositions can be stranded:

- short-distance movement:

[...] dat hij zo'n donker bos niet in durft te lopen [...]
[...] that he such-a dark forest not into dares to walk [...]
'[...] that he doesn't dare walk into such a dark forest [...]'

- Another way to analyze examples like the one above would be to allow arbitrary "postposition + verb" sequences to act as transitive separable prefix verbs (e.g. in + lopen → inlopen), but such an analysis would not be consistent with the position of in in the second example. (The postposition can also appear in the verbal prefix position: [...] dat hij zo'n donker bos niet durft in te lopen [...].)

=== Pseudopassives ===
==== In English ====
Pseudopassives (prepositional passives or passive constructions) are the result of the movement of the object of a preposition to fill an empty subject position for a passive verb. The phenomenon is comparable to regular passives, which are formed through the movement of the object of the verb to subject position. In prepositional passives, unlike in wh-movement, the object of the preposition is not a wh-word but rather a pronoun or noun phrase:

- This bed looks as if it has been slept in.

==== In French ====
- Some dialects permit proposition-stranding.
  - Robert a été parlé beaucoup de au meeting.
  - 'Robert was much talked about at the meeting.'
- Standard French bans it.
  - On a beaucoup parlé de Robert au meeting.

=== Relative clauses ===
==== In English ====
Relative clauses in English can exhibit preposition stranding with or without an explicit relative pronoun:

- This is the book that I told you about.
- This is the book I told you about.

==== In French ====
To standard French ears, all of those constructions sound quite alien and are thus considered barbarisms or anglicismes.

However, not all dialects of French allow preposition stranding to the same extent. For instance, Ontario French restricts preposition stranding to relative clauses with certain prepositions. In most dialects, stranding is impossible with the prepositions à 'to' and de 'of'.

A superficially-similar construction is possible in standard French in cases where the object is not moved but implied, such as Je suis pour 'I'm all for (it)' or Il faudra agir selon 'We'll have to act according to (the situation)'.

- Some dialects permit
  - Tu connais pas la fille que je te parle de.
  - 'You don't know the girl that I'm talking to you about.'
- Standard French requires
  - Tu ne connais pas la fille dont je te parle.
- Another more widespread non-standard variant is
  - Tu ne connais pas la fille que je te parle.

=== R-pronouns ===
==== In Dutch ====
Dutch prepositions generally do not take the ordinary neuter pronouns (het, dat, wat, etc.) as objects. Instead, they become postpositional suffixes for the corresponding r-pronouns (er, daar, waar, etc.): hence, not *over het ('about it'), but erover (literally 'thereabout'). However, the r-pronouns can sometimes be moved to the left and thereby strand the postposition:

Wij praatten er niet over.
We talked there not about.
'We didn't talk about it.'

=== Split construction ===
==== In German ====
Some regional varieties of German show a similar phenomenon to some Dutch constructions with da(r)- and wo(r)- forms. That is called a split construction (Spaltkonstruktion). Standard German provides composite words for the particle and the bound preposition. The split occurs easily with a composite interrogative word (as shown in the English example) or with a composite demonstrative word (as shown in the Dutch example).

For example, the demonstrative davon ('of that / of those / thereof'):

- Standard German requires

Ich kann mir davon nichts leisten.
I can me thereof nothing afford.
'I can't afford any of those.'

- Some dialects permit

Ich kann mir da nichts von leisten.
I can me there-[clipped] nothing of afford.
'I can't afford any of those.'

Again, although the stranded postposition has nearly the same surface distribution as a separable verbal prefix (herbekommen is a valid composite verb), it would not be possible to analyze these Dutch and German examples in terms of the reanalyzed verbs *overpraten and *vonkaufen, for the following reasons:

- The stranding construction is possible with prepositions that never appear as separable verbal prefixes (e.g., Dutch van, German von).
- Stranding is not possible with any kind of object besides an r-pronoun.
- Prefixed verbs are stressed on the prefix; in the string von kaufen in the above sentences, the preposition cannot be accented.
  - Also, pronunciation allows distinguishing an actual usage of a verb like herbekommen from a split construction her bekommen.

== Controversy ==
=== In English ===
Although preposition stranding has been found in English since the earliest times, it has often been the subject of controversy, and some usage advisors have attempted to form a prescriptive rule against it.

The earliest attested disparagement of preposition stranding in English is datable to the 17th-century grammarian Joshua Poole, but it became popular after 1672, when the poet John Dryden objected to Ben Jonson's 1611 phrase "the bodies that those souls were frighted from". Dryden did not explain why he thought the sentence should be restructured to front the preposition. In his earlier writing, Dryden himself had employed terminal prepositions but he systematically removed them in later editions of his work, explaining that when in doubt he would translate his English into Latin to test its elegance. Latin has no construction comparable to preposition stranding.

Usage writer Robert Lowth wrote in his 1762 textbook A Short Introduction to English Grammar that the construction was more suitable for informal than for formal English: "This is an Idiom which our language is strongly inclined to; it prevails in common conversation, and suits very well with the familiar style in writing; but the placing of the Preposition before the Relative is more graceful, as well as more perspicuous; and agrees much better with the solemn and elevated Style." However Lowth used the construction himself, including a humorously self-referential example in this passage ("is strongly inclined to"), and his comments do not amount to a proscription.

A stronger view was taken by Edward Gibbon, who not only disparaged sentence-terminal prepositions but, noting that prepositions and adverbs are often difficult to distinguish, also avoided phrasal verbs which put on, over or under at the end of the sentence, even when these are clearly adverbs. (Note: For more on the distinction between verbs with particles (called adverbs in older texts) and those with prepositional phrases, see English phrasal verbs#Types) By the 19th century, the tradition of English school teaching had come to deprecate the construction, and the proscription is still taught in some schools at the beginning of the 21st century.

However, there were also voices which took an opposite view. In his Dictionary of Modern English Usage (1926), H. W. Fowler noted: "It is a cherished superstition that prepositions must, in spite of the incurable English instinct for putting them late [...] be kept true to their name & placed before the word they govern." Fowler dedicated four columns of the Dictionary to a rebuttal of the prescription:

The fact is that the remarkable freedom enjoyed by English in putting its prepositions late & omitting its relatives is an important element in the flexibility of the language. [...] That depends on what they are cut with is not improved by conversion into That depends on with what they are cut; & too often the lust of sophistication, once blooded, becomes uncontrollable, & ends with, That depends on the answer to the question as to with what they are cut.

Criticizing the controversy over preposition stranding, American linguist Don Ringe stated:

The original reason for the objection, apparently, was that Latin has no such construction (or, with a bit more sophistication, that few other languages have such a construction). In other words, people who objected to preposition stranding were insisting that English grammar should be like Latin. That's perverse – English isn't Latin and isn't even descended from Latin...

Overzealous avoidance of stranded prepositions was sometimes ridiculed for leading to unnatural-sounding sentences, including the quip apocryphally attributed to Winston Churchill: This is the sort of tedious nonsense up with which I will not put.

Today, most sources consider it to be acceptable in standard formal English. As O'Conner and Kellerman point out: "Great literature from Chaucer to Milton to Shakespeare to the King James version of the Bible was full of so called terminal prepositions." Mignon Fogarty ("Grammar Girl") says, "nearly all grammarians agree that it's fine to end sentences with prepositions, at least in some cases."

== Sources ==
- Cutts, Martin (2009). Oxford Guide to Plain English (Third ed.). Oxford: Oxford University Press. ISBN 978-0-19-955850-6.
- O'Conner, Patricia T.; Kellerman, Stewart (2009). Origins of the Specious: Myths and Misconceptions of the English Language. New York: Random House. ISBN 978-0-8129-7810-0.

== See also ==
- Dangling modifier
