= Mignon Fogarty =

American writer (born 1967)

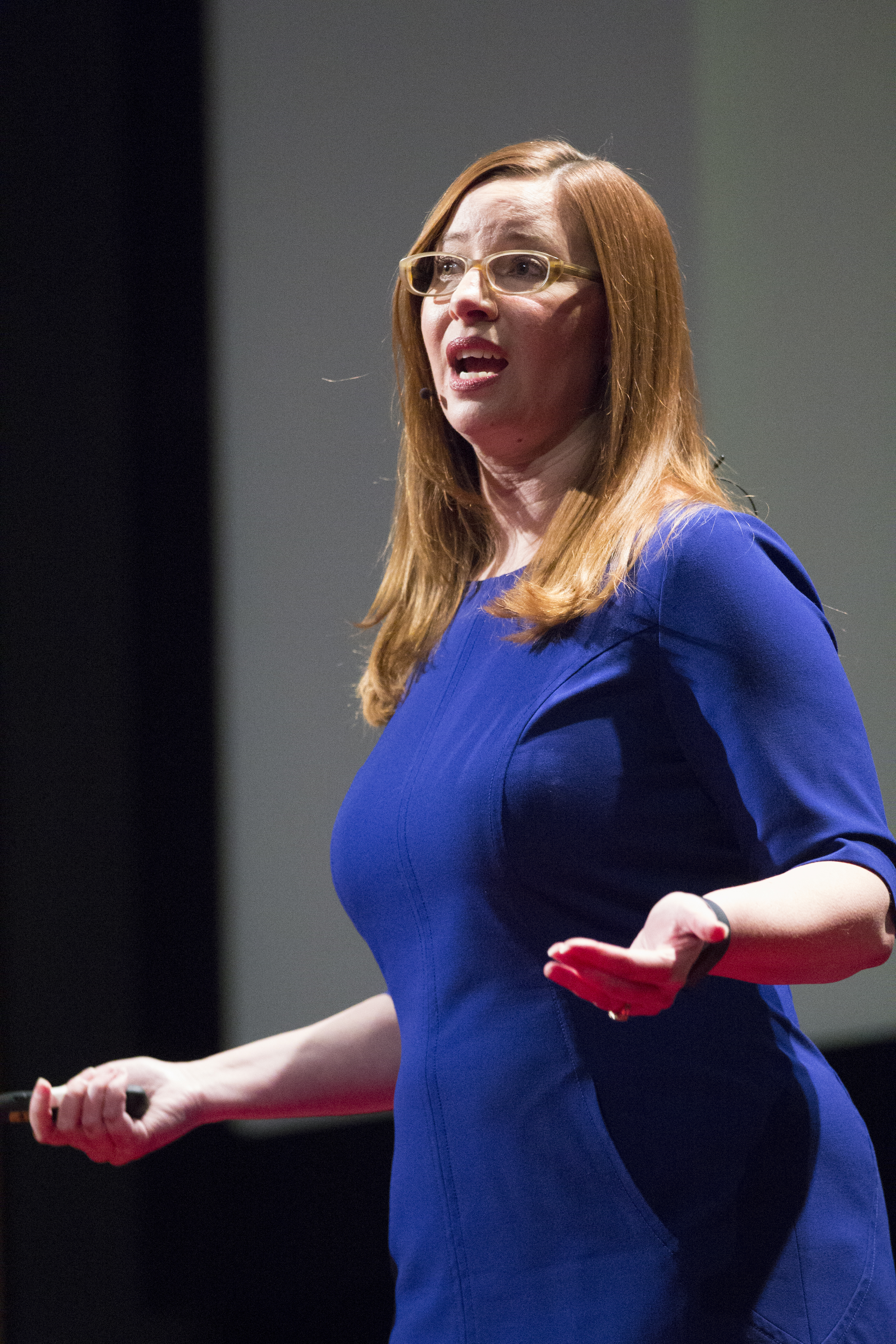
- Fogarty on September 26, 2015
- Born: 1967 (age 58–59)
- Other name: Grammar Girl
- Occupation: Podcaster
- Known for: Grammar Girl's Quick and Dirty Tips for Better Writing

Mignon Fogarty (born 1967) is a former faculty member in journalism at the University of Nevada, Reno, and a former science writer who produces an educational podcast about English grammar and usage titled Grammar Girl's Quick and Dirty Tips for Better Writing, which was named one of the best podcasts of 2007 by iTunes. She is also the founder of the Quick and Dirty Tips podcasting network.

== Education and career ==
Fogarty graduated with a Bachelor of Arts in English from the University of Washington, and a Master of Science in biology from Stanford University. In addition to studying, her college years also saw the birth of her career as an entrepreneur, as she and a college roommate started their first business making and selling hair accessories during this period.

Mignon's career has focused on science and writing. She has been the editor-in-chief and producer for the LongerLiving website before becoming the editorial director of CaregiverZone. Later, she became the editorial director and executive producer of GeneticHealth.com. She was the producer and co-host of the podcast Absolute Science.

She joined the Reynolds School of Journalism at the University of Nevada, Reno, in 2014, and, until 2017, she held the Donald W. Reynolds Chair in Media Entrepreneurship.

== Television appearances ==
In January 2007, CNN featured Fogarty and her podcast, calling her "a quick and dirty success".

Mignon Fogarty appeared on the March 26, 2007 episode of The Oprah Winfrey Show as a grammar expert. She was on the show to answer a viewer's question about the use of possessive apostrophes. The viewer thought a previous show should have been titled "Oprah's and Gayle's Big Adventure", but Fogarty confirmed that "Oprah and Gayle's Big Adventure" was a correct use of compound possessive. She went on to discuss several other common grammar errors, including "Affect vs. Effect" and "Who vs. Whom".

== Books ==
In September 2007, Fogarty and Holt/Holtzbrinck agreed to produce books coordinated with the podcasts. The first audiobook to come from the Holt agreement, Grammar Girl's Quick and Dirty Tips to Clean Up Your Writing, was named one of the top five audiobooks of 2007 by iTunes.

In July 2008, Holt released Fogarty's first paperback book, Grammar Girl's Quick and Dirty Tips for Better Writing. In August 2008, the book reached number nine on the New York Times Best Seller List. In March 2009, the audiobook version was nominated for a 2009 Audie Award, and in July 2009, O, The Oprah Magazine listed the audiobook as one of its "must-hear audiobooks".

Her second book, The Grammar Devotional, was published by Holt in October 2009.

In July 2011, Henry Holt published Grammar Girl Presents the Ultimate Writing Guide for Students, which was named a Teachers' Choice book by the International Reading Association, and St. Martin's Griffin published Grammar Girl's 101 Words Every High School Graduate Needs to Know and Grammar Girl's 101 Misused Words You'll Never Confuse Again, which was a Washington Post bestseller the week of July 31, 2011.

== Games ==
On August 22, 2013, Fogarty released Grammar Pop, a grammar-based word matching game for the iPad.

== Radio ==
In August 2009, Spark, a radio program on the Canadian Broadcasting Corporation, announced that Fogarty would be joining their team for a special series.

On July 7, 2011, Fogarty was interviewed by Neal Conan for the NPR program Talk of the Nation. In the 17-minute segment, Fogarty discussed a number of examples from her 2011 book, Grammar Girl's 101 Misused Words You'll Never Confuse Again (New York: St. Martin's Griffin, 2011), and answered listeners' questions.

In 2012, Fogarty began doing regular segments about language on KPCC on Southern California Public Radio.

== Tributes ==
On his Discovery Science Channel series It's All Geek to Me, New York Times technology writer David Pogue dressed up as Fogarty—hair, glasses, and all—and lip-synched one of her actual podcasts as part of a "visual demonstration" of what podcasts were in that program's episode about the iPod. He also gave the same treatment to Grammar Girl's fellow Quick and Dirty Tips podcaster Legal Lad.
