= Data (disambiguation) =

Data is a collection of values that convey information that may be further interpreted formally.

For its usage and etymology, see data (word).

Data or DATA may also refer to:

== Fictional characters ==
- Data, in The Goonies (1985)
- Data (Star Trek), first appearing in 1987

== Computing ==
- Data (computer science), any sequence of one or more symbols, requiring interpretation to become information
- data URI scheme, a uniform resource identifier prefix

== Biology ==
- Data (moth), a genus in the family Noctuidae
- Diaryltriazines (DATA), a class of organic molecules
- Sense data, the raw sensations at the root of perception according to some western philosophies

== Organizations ==
- DATA (band), a techno-pop band created by Georg Kajanus in 1980
- Data Records, a record label
- DATA, a non-governmental organization founded by Bono in 2002
- Design and Technology Academy, a school in San Antonio, Texas, U.S.
- Draughtsmen's and Allied Technicians' Association, later Technical, Administrative and Supervisory Section, a defunct British trade union
- Durham Area Transit Authority, now GoDurham, the public transit agency serving Durham, North Carolina, U.S.

== People ==
- Ajay Data (born 1973), Indian entrepreneur
- Marisha Data, Polish-American singer and comedian
- Róża Data, Polish rower

== Other uses ==
- Data, Hisar, a village in Haryana, India
- Euclid's Data, a book about geometry (c. 300 BC)
- "Data", an episode (S4 E3; #31; 2015) of Veep
- Data (album), by Tainy, 2023
- Mount Data, in the Philippines

== See also ==
- Datum (disambiguation), the singular of "data"
- Adata (disambiguation)
- Codata (disambiguation)
- Microdata (disambiguation)

=== Similar spellings ===
- Daata (disambiguation)
- Datta (disambiguation)
- Dada (disambiguation)
- Tata (disambiguation)
- Date (disambiguation)
