= English plurals =

How English plurals are formed; typically -(e)s

English plurals include the plural forms of English nouns and English determiners. This article discusses the variety of ways in which English plurals are formed from the corresponding singular forms, as well as various issues concerning the usage of singulars and plurals in English. For plurals of pronouns, see English personal pronouns.

Phonological transcriptions provided in this article are for Received Pronunciation and General American. For more information, see English phonology.

== Meaning ==
Although the everyday meaning of plural is "more than one", the grammatical term has a slightly different technical meaning. In the English system of grammatical number, singular means "one (or minus one)", and plural means "not singular". In other words, plural means not just "more than one" but also "less than one (except minus one)". This less-than aspect can be seen in cases like the temperature is zero degrees (not *zero degree (Note: This article uses asterisks to indicate ungrammatical examples.)) and 0.5 children per woman (not *0.5 child per woman).

== Form ==
=== Regular plurals ===
The plural morpheme in English is a sibilant suffixed to the end of most nouns. Regular English plurals fall into three classes, depending upon the sound that ends the singular form:

==== Any sibilant ====
In English, there are six sibilant consonants: /s/, /z/, /ʃ/, /ʒ/, /tʃ/, and /dʒ/. When a singular noun ends in one of these sounds, its plural is spoken by appending /ɪz/ or /əz/ (in some transcription systems, this is abbreviated as /ᵻz/). The spelling adds -es, or -s if the singular already ends in -e:

kiss	kisses	/ˈkɪsɪz/
phase	phases	/ˈfeɪzɪz/
dish	dishes	/ˈdɪʃɪz/
massage	massages	/məˈsɑːʒɪz/ or /ˈmɑːsɑːʒɪz/
witch	witches	/ˈwɪtʃɪz/
judge	judges	/ˈdʒʌdʒɪz/

==== Other voiceless consonants ====
In most English varieties, there are five non-sibilant voiceless consonants that occur at the end of words: /p/, /t/, /k/, /f/, and /θ/; some varieties also have /x/. When the singular form ends in a voiceless consonant other than a sibilant, the plural is normally formed by adding /s/ (a voiceless sibilant). The spelling adds -s:

lap	laps	/læps/
cat	cats	/kæts/
clock	clocks	/klɒks/
cuff	cuffs	/kʌfs/
death	deaths	/dɛθs/
loch	lochs	/lɒxs/ or /lɒks/

Some that end in /f/ or /θ/, however, are "near-regular". See section below.

==== Other voiced phonemes ====
For a singular noun ending on a non-sibilant voiced consonant, the plural adds /z/ (a voiced sibilant) and the spelling adds -s:

girl	girls	/ɡɜːrlz/
chair	chairs	/tʃɛərz/

In English, all vowels are voiced. Nouns ending in a vowel sound similarly add /z/ to form the plural. The spelling usually adds -s, but certain instances (detailed below) may add -es instead:

boy	boys	/bɔɪz/

===== Plurals of nouns in -o preceded by a consonant =====
Singular nouns ending in o preceded by a consonant in many cases spell the plural by adding -es (pronounced /z/):

hero	heroes	/ˈhiroʊz/
potato	potatoes	/pəˈteɪtoʊz/
volcano	volcanoes or volcanos	/vɒlˈkeɪnoʊz/
echo	echoes

However, many nouns of foreign origin, including almost all Italian loanwords, add only -s:

canto	cantos
hetero	heteros
photo	photos
zero	zeros (or zeroes)
piano	pianos
portico	porticos
pro	pros
quarto (paper size)	quartos
kimono	kimonos

==== Plurals of nouns in -y ====
Nouns ending in a vocalic y (that is, used as a vowel) preceded by a consonant usually drop the y and add -ies (pronounced /iz/, or /aiz/ in words where the y is pronounced /ai/):

cherry	cherries	/ˈt͡ʃɛɹiz/
lady	ladies	/ˈleɪdiz/
sky	skies	/skaɪz/

Words ending in quy also follow this pattern, since in English qu is a digraph for two consonant sounds (/kw/) or sometimes one (/k/):

colloquy	colloquies	/ˈkɒləkwiz/
obsequy	obsequies	/ˈɒbsəkwiz/
soliloquy	soliloquies	/səˈlɪləkwiz/

However, proper nouns (particularly names of people) of this type usually form their plurals by simply adding -s: the two Kennedys, there are three Harrys in our office. With place names this rule is not always adhered to: Sicilies and Scillies are the standard plurals of Sicily and Scilly, while Germanys and Germanies are both used. Nor does the rule apply to words that are merely capitalized common nouns: P&O Ferries (from ferry).

Other exceptions include lay-bys and stand-bys.

Words ending in a y preceded by a vowel form their plurals by adding -s:

day	days	/ˈdeɪz/
monkey	monkeys	/ˈmʌŋkiz/

However, the plural form (rarely used) of money is usually monies, although moneys is also found. Also, the plural of trolley can be either trolleys or trollies, although the former is more common.

==== Plurals of nouns in -i ====
Nouns written with -i usually have plurals in -is but some in -ies are also found.

alibi	alibis	/ˈæl.ə.baɪz/
bikini	bikinis	/bɪˈkiːniz/
Israeli	Israelis	/ɪzˈɹeɪliz/
chili or chilli	chilis, chilies, chillis or chillies	/ˈt͡ʃɪliz/
alkali	alkalies	/ˈæl.kə.laɪz/

=== Near-regular plurals ===
In Old and Middle English, voiceless fricatives /f/ and /θ/ mutated to voiced fricatives /v/ and /ð/ respectively before a voiced ending. In some words this voicing survives in the modern English plural. In the case of /f/ changing to /v/, the mutation is indicated in the orthography as well; also, a silent e is added in this case if the singular does not already end with -e:

bath	baths	/bɑːðz/, /bæðz/
mouth (Note: In accents with Canadian raising, the mutation to a voiced consonant can produce a change in the sound of the preceding diphthong (/aʊ/ or /aɪ/).)	mouths	/maʊðz/
calf	calves	/kɑːvz/, /kævz/
leaf	leaves	/liːvz/
knife	knives	/naɪvz/
life	lives	/laɪvz/

In addition, there is one word where /s/ is voiced in the plural:

house	houses	/haʊzᵻz/

Many nouns ending in /f/ or /θ/ (including all words where /f/ is represented orthographically by gh or ph) nevertheless retain the voiceless consonant:

moth	moths (Note: Voiced /mɒðz/ is rare but does occur in New England and Canada.)
proof	proofs

Some can do either:

dwarf (Note: For dwarf, the common form of the plural was dwarfs—as, for example, in Walt Disney's Snow White and the Seven Dwarfs—until J. R. R. Tolkien popularized dwarves; he intended the changed spelling to differentiate the "dwarf" fantasy race in his novels from the cuter and simpler beings common in fairy tales, but his usage has since spread. Multiple astronomical dwarf stars and multiple non-mythological short human beings, however, remain dwarfs.)	dwarfs/dwarves
hoof	hoofs/hooves
elf	elfs/elves
roof	roofs (Note: Commonly voiced as /ɹuːvz/ to rhyme with hooves, but rooves is a rare archaic spelling.)
staff (Note: For staff (/stæf/ or /stɑːf/) in the sense of "a body of employees", the plural is always staff; otherwise, both staffs and staves (/steɪvz/) are acceptable, except in compounds, such as flagstaffs. Staves is rare in North America except in the sense of "magic rod", or the musical notation tool; stave of a barrel or cask is a back-formation from staves, which is its plural. (See the Plural to singular by back-formation section below.))	staffs/staves
turf	turfs/turves (latter rare)

=== Irregular plurals ===
There are many other less regular ways of forming plurals, usually stemming from older forms of English or from foreign borrowings.

==== Nouns with identical singular and plural ====
Some nouns have identical singular and plural (zero inflection). Many of these are the names of animals:

- bison
- buffalo (or buffaloes)
- carp
- cod
- deer (and all species in the deer family such as moose and elk)
- fish (or fishes)
- kakapo (and similar loanwords – see below)
- neat
- pike
- salmon
- sheep
- shrimp or shrimps (British)
- squid
- trout

As a general rule, game or other animals are often referred to in the singular for the plural in a sporting context: "He shot six brace of pheasant", "Carruthers bagged a dozen tiger last year", whereas in another context such as zoology or tourism the regular plural would be used. Eric Partridge refers to these sporting terms as "snob plurals" and conjectures that they may have developed by analogy with the common English irregular plural animal words "deer", "sheep" and "trout". Similarly, nearly all kinds of fish have no separate plural form (though there are exceptions—such as rays, sharks or lampreys). As to the word fish itself, the plural is usually identical to the singular, although fishes is sometimes used, especially when meaning "species of fish". Fishes is also used in iconic contexts, such as the Bible story of the loaves and fishes, or the reference in The Godfather, "Luca Brasi sleeps with the fishes." The plurals of the names of fishes either take the ending -s or is the same as the singular.

Other nouns that have identical singular and plural forms include:

- craft (meaning 'vessel'), including aircraft, watercraft, spacecraft, hovercraft (but in the sense of a skill or art, the plural is regular, crafts)
- blues (referring to individual songs in the blues musical style: "play me a blues"; "he sang three blues and a calypso")
- cannon (cannons is more common in North America and Australia, while cannon as plural is more common in the United Kingdom.)
- chassis (only the spelling is identical; the singular is pronounced /(t)ʃæsi/ while the plural is /(t)ʃæsiz/)
- counsel (in the meaning of lawyer)
- head (referring, in the plural, to animals in a herd: "fifty head of cattle": cf brace above)
- iris (usually irises, but iris can be the plural for multiple plants; in medical contexts irides is used, see § Irregular plurals from Latin and Greek below)
- series, species (and other words in -ies, from the Latin fifth declension) [The word specie refers only to money, coins, from the Latin ablative singular form in the phrase in specie. It has no plural form.]
- stone—as a unit of weight equal to 14 pounds (occasionally stones)

Many names for Native American peoples are not inflected in the plural:

- Cherokee
- Cree
- Comanche
- Delaware
- Hopi
- Iroquois
- Kiowa
- Navajo
- Ojibwa
- Sioux
- Zuni

Exceptions include Algonquins, Apaches, Aztecs, Chippewas, Hurons, Incas, Mohawks, Oneidas, and Seminoles.

English sometimes distinguishes between regular plural forms of demonyms/ethnonyms (e.g. "five Dutchmen", "several Irishmen"), and uncountable plurals used to refer to entire nationalities collectively (e.g. "the Dutch", "the Irish").

Certain other words borrowed from foreign languages such as Japanese and Māori are "correctly" not inflected in the plural, although many people are not aware of this rule; see § Irregular plurals from other languages below.

==== Plurals in -(e)n ====
The plurals of a few nouns are formed from the singular by adding -n or -en, stemming from the Old English weak declension. Only the following three are commonly found:

ox	oxen	(particularly when referring to a team of draft (draught) animals, sometimes oxes in nonstandard American English)
child	children	(only possible plural; originated as a double plural, with -en added to Old English plural cildra/cildru, which also led to the archaic plural childer as in Childermas, occasionally still encountered in Ireland).
brother	brethren	(archaic as plural of brother meaning a male sibling, but often seen as plural of brother meaning a member of a religious congregation or fraternal organization)

As noted, the word "children" comes from an earlier form "childer". There were formerly a few other words like this: eyre/eyren (eggs), lamber/lambren (lambs), and calver/calveren (calves).

An interesting example may be found embedded in the name of the London parish of Clerkenwell, which derives its name from being the Clerks' Well associated with the Clerkenwell Priory of the Knights Hospitaller.

The following -(e)n plurals are found in dialectal, rare, or archaic usage:

bee	been	(dialectal, Ireland)
cow	kine	(archaic/regional; actually earlier plural "kye" [cf. Scots "kye"—"cows"] plus -en suffix, forming a double plural)
eye	eyen	(rare, found in some regional dialects, used by Shakespeare)
shoe	shoon	(rare/dialectal)
house	housen	(rare/dialectal, used by Rudyard Kipling in Puck of Pook's Hill)
hose	hosen	(rare/archaic, used in King James Version of the Bible)
knee	kneen	(archaic/obsolete)
tree	treen	(archaic/obsolete, used by William Browne)
aurochs	aurochsen	(alternative plural, also aurochs)

The word box, referring to a computer, is sometimes pluralized humorously to boxen in hacker subculture, by analogy to oxen. In the same context, multiple VAX computers are sometimes called Vaxen, particularly if operating as a cluster. Multiple Unix systems are sometimes referred to as Unix boxen, or may be called Unices along the Latin model.

==== Apophonic plurals ====
The plural is sometimes formed by changing the vowel sound of the singular (these are sometimes called mutated plurals):

foot	feet
goose	geese
louse	lice
dormouse	dormice
man	men
mouse	mice
tooth	teeth
woman	women /ˈwɪmᵻn/

This group consists of words that historically belong to the Old English consonant declension, see Germanic umlaut § I-mutation in Old English. There are many compounds of man and woman that form their plurals in the same way: postmen, policewomen, etc.

The plural of mongoose is mongooses. Mongeese is a back-formation by analogy to goose / geese and is often used in a jocular context. The form meese is sometimes also used humorously as the plural of moose—normally moose or mooses—or even of mouse.

==== Miscellaneous irregular plurals ====
Some words have irregular plurals that do not fit any of the types given here.

- person—people (suppletive; also regular persons, in more formal (legal and technical) contexts; people can also be a singular noun with plural peoples.)
- die—dice (dice is the standard plural for gaming dice, where it is often also used as the singular, and a variant plural for integrated circuit dies; in other senses, dies is used.)
- penny—pence (as a fraction of a pound unit of currency. The coin, worth one penny or one cent, has plural pennies. Similarly for halfpenny. Decimalisation in 1968–1971 promoted use of "p" for "new penny/pence".)

==== Irregular plurals from foreign languages ====
===== Irregular plurals from Latin and Greek =====
English has borrowed a great many words from Classical Latin and Classical Greek. Classical Latin has a very complex system of endings in which there are five categories or declensions of nouns, adjectives, and pronouns (some with sub-categories). Usually, in borrowing words from Latin, the endings of the nominative are used: nouns whose nominative singular ends in -a (first declension) have plurals in -ae (anima, animae); nouns whose nominative singular ends in -um (second declension neuter) have plurals in -a (stadium, stadia; datum, data). (For a full treatment, see Latin declensions.)

Classical Greek has a simpler system, but still more complicated than that of English. Most loan words from Greek in English are from Attic Greek (the Athenian Greek of Plato, Aristotle, and other great writers), not Demotic Greek, Koine (Biblical) Greek, or Modern Greek. This is because Attic Greek is what is taught in classes in Greek in Western Europe, and therefore was the Greek that the word borrowers knew.

====== Anglicisation ======
The general trend with loanwords is toward what is called Anglicisation or naturalisation, that is, the re-formation of the word and its inflections as normal English words. Many nouns have settled on, or acquired a modern form from the original (usually Latin). Other nouns have become Anglicised, taking on the normal "s" ending. In some cases, both forms are still competing.

The choice of a form can often depend on context: for a scholar, the plural of appendix is appendices (following the original language); for some physicians, the plural of appendix is appendixes. Likewise, a radio or radar engineer works with antennas, but an entomologist deals with antennae. The choice of form can also depend on the level of discourse: traditional Latin plurals are found more often in academic and scientific contexts, whereas in daily speech the Anglicised forms are more common. In the following table, the Latin plurals are listed, together with the Anglicised forms when these are more common.

Different paradigms of Latin pronunciation can lead to confusion as to the number or gender of the noun in question. As traditionally used in English, including scientific, medical, and legal contexts, Latin nouns retain the classical inflection with regard to spelling; however, those inflections use an Anglicised pronunciation: the entomologist pronounces antennae as /ænˈtɛni/. This may cause confusion for those familiar with the Classical Latin pronunciation /ænˈtɛnaɪ/. The words alumni (masculine plural) and alumnae (feminine plural) are notorious in this regard, as alumni in Anglicised pronunciation sounds the same as alumnae in Classical Latin pronunciation, and vice versa.

Because many of these plurals do not end in -s, some of them have been reinterpreted as singular forms: particularly the words datum and medium (as in a "medium of communication"), where the original plurals data and media are now, in many contexts, used by some as singular mass nouns: "The media is biased"; "This data shows us that ..." (although a number of scientists, especially of British origin, still say "These data show us that ..."). See below for more information. Similarly, words such as criteria and phenomena are used as singular by some speakers, although this is still considered incorrect in standard usage (see below).

Final -a becomes -ae (also -æ), or just adds -s:

alumna	alumnae
antenna	antennae
aurora	aurorae/auroras
formula	formulae/formulas
encyclopaedia (or encyclopædia) / encyclopedia	encyclopaedias / encyclopedias (encyclopaediae and encyclopediae are rare)
larva	larvae
pupa	pupae/pupas

Scientific abbreviations for words of Latin origin ending in -a, such as SN for supernova, can form a plural by adding -e, as SNe for supernovae.

Final -ex or -ix becomes -ices (pronounced /ᵻsiːz/), or just adds -es:

index	indices	/ˈɪndᵻsiːz/	or indexes
matrix	matrices	/ˈmeɪtrᵻsiːz/
vertex	vertices	/ˈvɜːrtᵻsiːz/

Final -is becomes -es (pronounced /iːz/) or -ises/-ides:

axis	axes	/ˈæksiːz/
genesis	geneses	/dʒɛn.ə.siːz/
nemesis	nemeses	/ˈnɛməsiːz/
crisis	crises	/ˈkraɪsiːz/
testis	testes	/ˈtɛstiːz/
thesis	theses	/ˈθiːsiːz/
parenthesis	parentheses	/pəˈrɛnθəsiːz/
clitoris	clitorises/clitorides	/ˈklɪtərɪsiz/

Except for words derived from Greek polis, which become poleis (pronounced /iːs/ or /iːz/):

acropolis	acropoleis	/æˈkropoliːs/

(Some of these are Greek rather than Latin words, but the method of plural formation in English is the same.) Some people treat process as if it belonged to this class, pronouncing processes /ˈprɒsᵻsiːz/ instead of standard /ˈprɒsɛsᵻz/. Since the word comes from Latin processus, whose plural in the fourth declension is processūs with a long u, this pronunciation is by analogy, not etymology. Axes (/ˈæksiːz/), the plural of axis, is pronounced differently from axes (/ˈæksᵻz/), the plural of ax(e).

Final -ies remains unchanged:

series	series
species	species

Specie for a singular of species is considered nonstandard. It is standard meaning the form of money, where it derives from the Latin singular ablative in the phrase in specie.

Final -um becomes -a, or just adds -s:

addendum
addenda/addendums
agendum (obsolete, not listed in most dictionaries)
agenda means a "list of items of business at a meeting" and has the plural agendas.
corrigendum
corrigenda
curriculum
curricula/curriculums
datum
data (now usually treated as a singular mass noun in both informal and educated usage, but usage in scientific publications shows a strong American/British divide; American usage generally prefers to treat data as a singular in all contexts, including in serious and academic publishing. British usage now widely accepts treating data as singular in standard English, including educated everyday usage at least in non-scientific use. British scientific publishing usually still prefers treating data as a plural. Some British university style guides recommend using data for both the singular and the plural use and some recommend treating it only as a singular in connection with computers.)

In engineering, drafting, surveying, and geodesy, and in weight and balance calculations for aircraft, a datum (plural datums or data) is a reference point, surface, or axis on an object or the Earth's surface against which measurements are made.

forum
fora/forums (fora is rare and might only be used to refer to more than one original Roman forum)
medium
media (in communication systems and digital computers; this is now often treated as a singular mass noun); mediums (spiritualists, or items of medium size)
memorandum
memoranda/memorandums
millennium
millennia/millenniums
ovum
ova
referendum
referendums (often taken to mean plebiscites, and referenda as the propositions voted on. It is often argued that referenda is incorrect because it is a Latin gerund, which did not have a plural form, while the "propositions voted on" is more like a gerundive, which could be pluralised.)
spectrum
spectra (as in power spectrum in electrical engineering)
stadium
stadia/stadiums (the latter is far more common)
stratum
strata

Final -us becomes -i (second declension, [aɪ]) or -era or -ora (third declension), or just adds -es (especially for fourth declension words, where the Latin plural was similar to the singular):

alumnus	alumni
cactus	cactuses/cacti (in Arizona many people avoid either choice with cactus as both singular and plural)
campus	campuses (The Latinate plural form campi is sometimes used, particularly with respect to colleges or universities; however, it is sometimes frowned upon. By contrast, the common plural form campuses is universally accepted.)
corpus	corpora/corpuses
census	censuses
focus	foci/focuses
fungus	fungi
genus	genera
hippopotamus	hippopotamuses/hippopotami
octopus	octopuses (octopi also occurs, although it is strictly speaking unfounded because it is not a Latin noun of the second declension, but rather a Latinized form of Greek ὀκτώπους [oktṓpous, "eight-foot"]. The theoretically correct form octopodes is rarely used.)
platypus	platypuses (same as octopus: platypi occurs but is etymologically incorrect, and platypodes, while technically correct, is even rarer than octopodes)
prospectus	prospectuses (plural prospectus is rare although correct in Latin)
radius	radii
succubus	succubi (the word omnibus is similar in form but is originally dative plural, so cannot be pluralised to *omnibi: see The Motor Bus)
stylus	styli/styluses
syllabus	syllabi/syllabuses
terminus	termini/terminuses
uterus	uteri/uteruses
viscus	viscera
virus	viruses (see Plural form of words ending in -us § Virus)

Final -us remains unchanged in the plural (fourth declension—the plural has a long ū to differentiate it from the singular short u):

meatus	meatus (but usually meatuses)
status	status (but usually statuses)
apparatus	apparatus (but usually apparatuses)

Colloquial usages based in a humorous fashion on the second declension include Elvii (better Latin would be Elvēs or Elvidēs) to refer to multiple Elvis impersonators, and Loti, used by petrolheads to refer to Lotus automobiles in the plural.

Some Greek plurals are preserved in English (cf. Plurals of words of Greek origin):

Final -on becomes -a:

automaton	automata/automatons
criterion	criteria/criterions (the latter form is rare)
phenomenon	phenomena/phenomenons (the latter form is common, though sometimes proscribed)
polyhedron	polyhedra/polyhedrons

Final -as in one case changes to -antes:

Atlas	Atlantes (statues of the Titan); but
atlas	atlases (map collections)

Final -ma in nouns of Greek origin can become -mata, although -s is usually also acceptable, and in many cases more common.

stigma	stigmata/stigmas
stoma	stomata/stomas
schema	schemata/schemas
dogma	dogmata/dogmas
lemma	lemmata/lemmas
magma	magmata/magmas
anathema	anathemata/anathemas
enema	enemata/enemas

Such -ata plurals also occur in Latin words borrowed from Greek, e.g. poemata. The a is short in both languages.

===== Irregular plurals from other languages =====
Some nouns of French origin add an -x, which may be silent or pronounced /z/:

beau	beaux or beaus
bureau	bureaux or bureaus
château	châteaux or châteaus
milieu	milieux or milieus
tableau	tableaux or tableaus

See also § French compounds below.

Italian nouns, notably technical terms in music and art, often retain the Italian plurals:

cello	celli
timpano	timpani

Foreign terms may take native plural forms, especially when the user is addressing an audience familiar with the language. In such cases, the conventionally formed English plural may sound awkward or be confusing.

Nouns of Slavic origin add -a or -i according to native rules, or just -s:

kniazhestvo	kniazhestva / kniazhestvos
kobzar	kobzari / kobzars
oblast	oblasti / oblasts

Nouns of Hebrew origin add -im or -ot (generally m/f) according to native rules, or just -s:

cherub	cherubim / cherubs
seraph	seraphim / seraphs (The Hebrew singular is saraph. Seraph is a back-formation from seraphim. The form seraphims occurs in the King James Version.)
matzah	matzot / matzahs
kibbutz	kibbutzim / kibbutzes

-ot is pronounced os (with unvoiced s) in the Ashkenazi dialect.

Many nouns of Japanese origin have no plural form and do not change:

bentō	bentō
otaku	otaku
Pokémon	Pokémon
samurai	samurai

Other nouns such as kimonos, ninjas, futons, and tsunamis are more often seen with a regular English plural.

In New Zealand English, nouns of Māori origin can either take an -s or have no separate plural form. Words more connected to Māori culture and used in that context tend to retain the same form, while names of flora and fauna may or may not take an -s, depending on context. Many regard omission as more correct:

kiwi (Note: When referring to the bird, kiwi may or may not take an -s; when used as an informal term for a New Zealander, it always takes an -s.)	kiwi/kiwis
kowhai	kowhai/kowhais
Māori (Note: Māori, when referring to a person of that ethnicity, does not usually take an -s. Many speakers avoid the use of Māori as a noun, and instead use it only as an adjective.)	Māori/(occasionally Māoris)
marae	marae
tui	tuis/tui
waka	waka

Notes:

Some words borrowed from Inuktitut and related languages spoken by the Inuit in Canada, Greenland and Alaska, retain the original plurals. The word Inuit itself is the plural form. Canadian English also borrows Inuktitut singular Inuk, which is uncommon in English outside Canada.

Inuk (uncommon)	Inuit
inukshuk	inukshuit (rare)
Iqalummiuq	Iqalummiut ("inhabitants of Iqaluit")
Nunavimmiuq	Nunavimmiut ("inhabitants of Nunavik")
Nunavummiuq	Nunavummiut ("inhabitants of Nunavut")

Nouns from languages other than the above generally form plurals as if they were native English words:

canoe	canoes
cwm	cwms	"Welsh valley"; the Welsh plural is cymoedd
goulash	goulashes	the Hungarian plural of gulyás is gulyások
igloo	igloos	the Inuktitut plural of ᐃᒡᓗ iglu is ᐃᒡᓗᐃᑦ igluit
kangaroo	kangaroos
kayak	kayaks	the Inuktitut plural of ᖃᔭᖅ qajaq is ᖃᔭᐃᑦ qajait
kindergarten	kindergartens	the German plural is Kindergärten
ninja	ninja/ninjas	Japanese does not have plural forms
pizza	pizzas	the Italian plural is pizze
sauna	saunas	the Finnish plural is saunat

=== Plurals of compound nouns ===
The majority of English compound nouns have one basic term, or head, with which they end. These are nouns and are pluralized in typical fashion:

able seaman	able seamen
head banger	head bangers
yellow-dog contract	yellow-dog contracts

Some compounds have one head with which they begin. These heads are also nouns and the head usually pluralizes, leaving the second, usually a post-positive adjective, term unchanged:

attorney general	attorneys general
bill of attainder	bills of attainder
coat-of-arms	coats-of-arms
court martial	courts martial
director general	directors general
fee simple absolute	fees simple absolute
governor-general	governors-general
passerby	passersby
poet laureate	poets laureate
ship of the line	ships of the line
son-in-law	sons-in-law
chief of staff	chiefs of staff
procurator fiscal	procurators fiscal

It is common in informal speech to pluralize the last word instead, like most English nouns, but in edited prose aimed at educated people, the forms given above are usually preferred.

If a compound can be thought to have two heads, both of them tend to be pluralized when the first head has an irregular plural form:

man-child	men-children
manservant	menservants
woman doctor	women doctors (no longer in common use)

Two-headed compounds in which the first head has a standard plural form, however, tend to pluralize only the final head:

city-state	city-states
nurse-practitioner	nurse-practitioners
scholar-poet	scholar-poets

In military and naval usage, the terms general, colonel, and commander, as part of an officer's title, are etymologically adjectives, but they have been adopted as nouns and are thus heads, so compound titles employing them are pluralized at the end:

brigadier general	brigadier generals
lieutenant commander	lieutenant commanders
lieutenant colonel	lieutenant colonels
major general	major generals

For compounds of three or more words that have a head (or a term functioning as a head) with an irregular plural form, only that term is pluralized:

man-about-town	men-about-town
man-of-war/man-o'-war	men-of-war/men-o'-war
cat-o'-nine-tails	cats-o'-nine-tails
woman of the street	women of the street

For many other compounds of three or more words with a head at the front—especially in cases where the compound is ad hoc or the head is metaphorical—it is generally regarded as acceptable to pluralize either the first major term or the last (if open when singular, such compounds tend to take hyphens when plural in the latter case):

ham on rye	hams on rye/ham-on-ryes
jack-in-the-box	jacks-in-the-box/jack-in-the-boxes
jack-in-the-pulpit	jacks-in-the-pulpit/jack-in-the-pulpits

With a few extended compounds, both terms may be pluralized—again, with an alternative (which may be more prevalent, e.g. heads of state):

head of state	heads of states/heads of state
son of a bitch	sons of bitches/sons-of-a-bitch

In some extended compounds constructed around o, only the last term is pluralized (or left unchanged if it is already plural):

jack-o'-lantern	jack-o'-lanterns
will-o'-the-wisp	will-o'-the-wisps

See also the Headless nouns section below.

==== French compounds ====
Many English compounds have been borrowed directly from French, and these generally follow a somewhat different set of rules. In French loaned compounds with a noun as head and a qualifying adjective, it is correct to pluralize both words, in common with French practice. Usually in French, the noun precedes the adjective:

agent provocateur	agents provocateurs
entente cordiale	ententes cordiales
fait accompli	faits accomplis
idée fixe	idées fixes

In some expressions, the adjective precedes the noun, in which case it is still correct to pluralize both words, in common with French practice, although in the English form sometimes only the noun is pluralized:

beau geste	beaux gestes / beau gestes
belle époque	belles époques / belle époques
bon mot	bons mots / bon mots
bon vivant	bons vivants / bon vivants

However, if the adjectives beau "beautiful/handsome", nouveau "new", or vieux "old" precede a singular noun beginning with a vowel or a mute h (such as homme), they are changed to bel (as in the example below), nouvel, or vieil (to facilitate pronunciation in French). In these cases, both the noun and the adjective are pluralized in the English form as in French:

bel homme	beaux hommes

In other French compound expressions, only the head noun is pluralized:

aide-de-camp	aides-de-camp
coup d'état	coups d'état
cri du cœur / cri du coeur	cris du cœur / cris du coeur
cul-de-sac	culs-de-sac
fleur-de-lis	fleurs-de-lis
tour de force	tours de force

but:

tête-à-tête	tête-à-têtes	(In French the plural form is the same as the singular form.)

=== Plurals of letters and abbreviations ===
The plural of individual letters is usually written with -'s: there are two a's in this sentence; mind your p's and q's; dot the i's and cross the t's.

Some people extend this use of the apostrophe to other cases, such as plurals of numbers written in figures (e.g. "1990's"), words used as terms (e.g. "his writing uses a lot of but's"). However, others prefer to avoid this method (which can lead to confusion with the possessive -'s), and write 1990s, buts; this is the style recommended by The Chicago Manual of Style.

Likewise, acronyms and initialisms are normally pluralized simply by adding (lowercase) -s, as in MPs, although the apostrophe is sometimes seen. Use of the apostrophe is more common in those cases where the letters are followed by periods (B.A.'s), or where the last letter is S (as in PS's and CAS's, although PSs and CASs are also acceptable; the ending -es is also sometimes seen).

English (like Latin and certain other European languages) can form a plural of certain one-letter abbreviations by doubling the letter: p. ("page"), pp. ("pages"). Other examples include ll. ("lines"), ff. ("following lines/pages"), hh. ("hands", as a measure), PP. ("Popes"), SS. ("Saints"), ss. (or §§) ("sections"), vv. ("volumes"). Some multi-letter abbreviations can be treated the same way, by doubling the final letter: MS ("manuscript"), MSS ("manuscripts"); op. ("opus"), opp. ("opera" as plural of opus).

However, often the abbreviation used for the singular is used also as the abbreviation for the plural; this is normal for most units of measurement and currency. The SI unit symbols are officially not considered abbreviations and not pluralized, as in 10 m ("10 metres").

=== Headless nouns ===
In The Language Instinct, linguist Steven Pinker discusses what he calls "headless words", typically bahuvrihi compounds, such as lowlife and flatfoot, in which life and foot are not heads semantically; that is, a lowlife is not a type of life, and a flatfoot is not a type of foot. When the common form of such a word is singular, it is treated as if it has a regular plural, even if the final constituent of the word is usually pluralized in an irregular fashion. Thus the plural of lowlife is lowlifes, not "lowlives", according to Pinker. Other proposed examples include:

sabretooth	sabretooths
still life	still lifes
tenderfoot	tenderfoots

An exception is Blackfoot, of which the plural can be Blackfeet, though that form of the name is officially rejected by the Blackfoot First Nations of Canada.

Another analogous case is that of sport team names such as the Miami Marlins and Toronto Maple Leafs. For these, see § Teams and their members below.

=== Defective nouns ===
==== Plurals without singulars ====
Some nouns have no singular form. Such a noun is called a plurale tantum. Examples include cattle, thanks, clothes (originally a plural of cloth).

A particular set of nouns, describing things having two parts, comprises the major group of pluralia tantum in modern English:

- glasses (a pair of spectacles), pants, panties, pantyhose, pliers, scissors, shorts, suspenders, tongs (metalworking & cooking), trousers, etc.

These words are interchangeable with a pair of scissors, a pair of trousers, and so forth. In the American fashion industry it is common to refer to a single pair of pants as a pant—though this is a back-formation, the English word (deriving from the French pantalon) was originally singular. In the same field, one half of a pair of scissors separated from the other half is, rather illogically, referred to as a half-scissor. Tweezers used to be part of this group, but tweezer has come into common usage since the second half of the 20th century.

Nouns describing things having two parts are expressed in the singular when used as adjectives. Other pluralia tantum remain unchanged as adjectives.

a pair of spectacles	a spectacle grinder
a pair of trousers	a trouser press
clothes	a clothes line

There are also some plural nouns whose singular forms exist, though they are much more rarely encountered than the plurals:

nuptial	nuptials
phalanx (Note: In medical terminology, a phalanx is any bone of the finger or toe. A military phalanx is pluralized phalanxes.)	phalanges
tiding	tidings
victual	victuals
viscus	viscera

==== Singulars without plurals ====
Mass nouns (or uncountable nouns) do not represent distinct objects, so the singular and plural semantics do not apply in the same way. Some examples:

- Abstract nouns: deceit, information, cunning, and nouns derived from adjectives, such as honesty, wisdom, intelligence, poverty, stupidity, curiosity, and words ending with "-ness", such as goodness, freshness, laziness, and nouns which are homonyms of adjectives with a similar meaning, such as good, bad (can also use goodness and badness), hot, and cold.
- In the arts and sciences: chemistry, geometry, surgery, the blues, (Note: Referring to the musical style as a whole.) jazz, rock and roll, impressionism, surrealism. This includes those that look plural but function as grammatically singular in English, e.g., "Mathematics is fun" and "thermodynamics is the science of heat": mathematics (and in British English the shortened form 'maths'), physics, mechanics, dynamics, statics, thermodynamics, aerodynamics, electronics, hydrodynamics, robotics, acoustics, optics, computer graphics, ethics, linguistics, etc.
- Chemical elements and other physical entities: aluminum (U.S.) / aluminium (U.K.), copper, gold, oxygen, nitrogen, carbon, equipment, furniture, traffic, air and water

Notes:

Some mass nouns can be pluralized, but the meaning in this case may change somewhat. For example, when someone has two grains of sand, they do not have two sands, but sand. However, there could be the many "sands of Africa": either many distinct stretches of sand, or distinct types of sand of interest to geologists or builders, or simply the allusive The Sands of Mars.

It is rare to pluralize furniture in this way (though it was formerly more common) and information is never pluralized.

There are several isotopes of oxygen, which might be referred to as different oxygens. In casual speech, oxygen might be used as shorthand for "an oxygen atom", but in this case, it is not a mass noun, so one can refer to "multiple oxygens in the same molecule".

One would interpret "Bob's wisdoms" as "various pieces of Bob's wisdom" (that is, "don't run with scissors", "defer to those with greater knowledge"), deceits as a series of instances of deceitful behaviour (lied on income tax, dated my wife), and the different idlenesses of the worker as plural distinct manifestations of the mass concept of idleness (or as different types of idleness, "bone lazy" versus "no work to do").

The pair specie and species both come from a Latin word meaning "kind", but they do not form a singular-plural pair. In Latin, specie is the ablative singular form, while species is the nominative form, which happens to be the same in both singular and plural. In English, species behaves similarly—as a noun with identical singular and plural—while specie is treated as a mass noun, referring to money in the form of coins (the idea is of "[payment] in kind").

=== Singulars as plural and plurals as singular ===
==== Plural words becoming singular ====
===== Plural in form but singular in construction =====
Certain words which were originally plural in form have come to be used almost exclusively as singulars (usually uncountable); for example billiards, measles, news, mathematics, physics, etc. Some of these words, such as news, are strongly and consistently felt as singular by fluent speakers. These words are usually marked in dictionaries with the phrase "plural in form but singular in construction" (or similar wording). Others, such as aesthetics, are less strongly or consistently felt as singular; for the latter type, the dictionary phrase "plural in form but singular or plural in construction" recognizes variable usage.

===== Plural form became a singular form =====
Some words of foreign origin are much better known in their (foreign-morphology) plural form, and are often not even recognized by English speakers as having plural form; descriptively, in English morphology many of these simply are not in plural form, because English has naturalized the foreign plural as the English singular. Usage of the original singular may be considered pedantic, hypercorrective, or incorrect. In the examples below, the original plural is now commonly used as a singular, and in some cases a regular English plural (effectively a double plural) has been formed from it.

Original singular	Original plural/ common singular	Common plural
agendum	agenda (Note: An agenda commonly is used to mean a list of agenda.)	agendas
alga	algae	algae
biscotto	biscotti	biscotti
candelabrum	candelabra	candelabras
datum (Note: A single piece of data is sometimes referred to as a data point. In engineering, drafting, surveying, and geodesy, and in weight and balance calculations for aircraft, a datum (plural datums or data) is a reference point, surface, or axis on an object or the Earth's surface against which measurements are made.)	data	data (mass noun)
graffito	graffiti	graffiti (mass noun)
insigne	insignia	insignias
opus (Note: Retained in magnum opus and for the opus numbering system for systematically naming musical works by the same composer)	opera	operas
panino	panini	paninis (currently gaining use)
paparazzo	paparazzi	paparazzi
spaghetto	spaghetti	spaghetti (mass noun)
talib	taliban	taliban (collective noun)
zucchino	zucchini (U.S. English)	zucchinis

Magazine was derived from Arabic via French. It was originally plural, but in French and English it is always regarded as singular.

Other words whose plurals are sometimes used as singulars include:

criterion	criteria
phenomenon	phenomena

==== Back-formation ====
Some words have unusually formed singulars and plurals, but develop "normal" singular-plural pairs by back-formation. For example, pease (modern peas) was in origin a singular with plural peasen. However, pease came to be analysed as plural by analogy, from which a new singular pea was formed; the spelling of pease was also altered accordingly, surviving only in the name of the dish pease porridge or pease pudding. Similarly, termites was the three-syllable plural of termes; this singular was lost, however, and the plural form reduced to two syllables. Syringe is a back-formation from syringes, itself the plural of syrinx, a musical instrument. Cherry is from Norman French cherise. Phases was once the plural of phasis, but the singular is now phase. The nonstandard, offensive, and now obsolete Chinee and Portugee singulars are back-formations from the standard Chinese and Portuguese.

Kudos is a singular Greek word meaning praise, but is often taken to be a plural. At present, however, kudo is considered an error, though the usage is becoming more common as kudos becomes better known. The name of the Greek sandwich style gyros is increasingly undergoing a similar transformation.

The term, from Latin, for the main upper arm flexor in the singular is the biceps muscle (from biceps brachii); however, many English speakers take it to be a plural and refer to the muscle of only one arm, by back-formation, as a bicep. The correct—although very seldom used—Latin plural is bicipites.

The word sastrugi (hard ridges on deep snow) is of Russian origin and its singular is sastruga; but the imagined Latin-type singular sastrugus has sometimes been used.

==== Geographical plurals used as singular ====
Geographical names may be treated as singular even if they are plural in form, if they are regarded as representing a single entity such as a country: The United States is a country in North America (similarly with the Netherlands, the Philippines, Trinidad and Tobago, the United Nations, etc.). However, if the sense is a group of geographical objects, such as islands or mountains, a plural-form name will be treated as plural: The Hebrides are a group of islands off the coast of Scotland.

==== Singulars with collective meaning treated as plural ====
Words such as army, company, crowd, family, fleet, government, majority, mess, number, pack, party and team may refer either to a single entity or the members of the set composing it. If the latter meaning is intended, the word (though singular in form) may be treated as if it were a plural, in that it may take a plural verb and be replaced with a plural pronoun: (in British English) the government are considering their position (alternatively the government is considering its position). See synesis.

Thus, as H. W. Fowler describes, in British English they are "treated as singular or plural at discretion"; Fowler notes that occasionally a "delicate distinction" is made possible by discretionary plurals: "The Cabinet is divided is better, because in the order of thought a whole must precede division; and The Cabinet are agreed is better, because it takes two or more to agree."

=== Plurals of numbers ===
The following rules apply to the plurals of numerical terms such as dozen, score, hundred, thousand, million, and similar:

- When modified by a number, the plural is not inflected, that is, has no -s added. Hence one hundred, two million, four score, etc. (The resulting quantitative expressions are treated as numbers, in that they can modify nouns directly: three dozen eggs, although of is used before pronouns or definite noun phrases: three dozen of them/of those eggs.)
- When not modified by a number, the plural takes -s as usual, and the resulting expression is not a number (it requires of if modifying a noun): I have hundreds, dozens of complaints, the thousands of people affected. Although the word hundred is a number if and only if it is both modified by a number and modifies a number itself. three hundred thousand dollars
- When the modifier is a vaguer expression of number, either pattern may be followed: several hundred (people) or several hundreds (of people).
- When the word has a specific meaning rather than being a simple expression of quantity, it is pluralized as an ordinary noun: Last season he scored eight hundreds [=scores of at least 100 runs in cricket]. The same applies to other numbers: My phone number consists of three fives and four sixes.
- Note the expressions by the dozen etc. (singular); in threes [=in groups of three] etc. (plural); eight sevens are fifty-six etc.

=== Determiners ===
The demonstrative determiners this and that have plural forms these and those, respectively. The cardinal numeral determiners (e.g., twenty people) do not have plural forms. Apparent examples, such as they numbered in the twenties are nouns.

== Usage and number agreement ==
=== Nouns used attributively ===
Nouns used attributively to qualify other nouns are generally in the singular, even though for example, a dog catcher catches more than one dog, and a department store has more than one department. This is true even for some binary nouns where the singular form is not found in isolation, such as a trouser mangle or the scissor kick. This is also true where the attribute noun is itself qualified with a number, such as a twenty-dollar bill, a ten-foot pole or a two-man tent. The plural is used for pluralia tantum nouns: a glasses case is for eyeglasses, while a glass case is made of glass (but compare eyeglass case); also an arms race versus arm wrestling. The plural may be used to emphasise the plurality of the attribute, especially in British English but very rarely in American English: a careers advisor, a languages expert. The plural is also more common with irregular plurals for various attributions: women killers are women who kill, whereas woman killers are those who kill women.

The singular and plural forms of loanwords from other languages where countable nouns used attributively are, unlike English, plural and come at the end of the word are sometimes modified when entering English usage. For example, in Spanish, nouns composed of a verb and its plural object usually have the verb first and noun object last (e.g. the legendary monster chupacabras, literally "sucks-goats", or in a more natural English formation "goatsucker") and the plural form of the object noun is retained in both the singular and plural forms of the compound (i.e. singular el chupacabras, plural los chupacabras). However, when entering English, the final s of chupacabras was treated as a plural of the compound (i.e. the monster) rather than of the object of the verb (i.e. the goats), and so "chupacabra" without an s is the singular in English, even though in Spanish chupacabra could literally be construed as a creature that sucks only one single goat.

=== Teams and their members ===
In the names of sports teams, sometimes a noun will be given a regular plural in -s even though that noun in normal use has an irregular plural form (a particular case of headless nouns as described above). For example, there are teams called the Miami Marlins and the Toronto Maple Leafs, even though the word marlin normally has its plural identical to the singular and the plural of leaf is leaves. (This does not always apply; for example, there is the Minnesota Lynx, not *Lynxes.) Some teams use a non-standard plural spelling in their names, such as the Boston Red Sox and Chicago White Sox.

When a sport team's name is plural, the corresponding singular is often used to denote a member of that team; for example a player for the Cincinnati Reds may be referred to as a (Cincinnati) Red. This also applies to the St. Louis Blues ice hockey team, even though it is named after the song the "St. Louis Blues" and thus blues was originally a singular identical to its plural.

When a team's name is plural in form but cannot be singularized by removing an -s, as in Boston Red Sox, the plural is sometimes used as a singular (a player may be referred to as "a Red Sox"). Oftentimes, the singular "Red Sox" will be pronounced as if it were "Red Sock", even though the spelling suggests otherwise.

When a team's name is singular, as in Miami Heat and Colorado Avalanche, the same singular word may also sometimes be used to denote a player (a Heat, an Avalanche). When referring to more than one player, it is normal to use Heat players or Avalanche players (although in the latter case the team's plural-form nickname Avs is also available).

For the (especially British) treatment of teams as plural even if they have singular names, see § Singulars with collective meaning treated as plural above.

=== Adjectives as collective plurals ===
Certain adjectives can be used, uninflected, as plurals denoting people of the designated type. For example, unemployed and homeless can be used to mean "unemployed people" and "homeless people", as in There are two million unemployed. Such usage is common with the definite article, to denote people of a certain type generally: the unemployed, the homeless.

This is common with certain nationalities: the British, the Dutch, the English, the French, the Irish, the Spanish, the Welsh, and those where the adjective and noun singular and plural are identical anyway, including the Swiss and those in -ese (the Chinese etc.). In the case of most nationalities, however, the plural of the demonym noun is used for this purpose: (the) Americans, (the) Poles. Cases where the adjective formation is possible, but the noun provides a commonly used alternative, include the Scottish (or more commonly (the) Scots), the Danish (or (the) Danes), the Finnish (or (the) Finns), the Swedish (or (the) Swedes).

The noun is normally used anyway when referring to specific sets of people (five Frenchmen, a few Spaniards), although the adjective may be used especially in case of a group of mixed or unspecified sex, if the demonym nouns are gender-specific: there were five French (or French people) in the bar (if neither Frenchmen or Frenchwomen would be appropriate).

=== Numerical quantities ===
In common parlance, plural simply means "more than one". A quantity of one may sometimes be grammatically inflected as plural.

==== Decimals are always plural ====
Any quantity that includes decimal precision is plural. This includes 1 followed by any number of zeros. It is normal to say 1.0 gallons per flush, for instance, 0.6 units, or 3.3 children per couple, not *1.0 gallon, *0.6 unit, or *3.3 child per couple.

==== Fractions ====
Fractions are themselves singular or plural depending on the numerator (e.g. one eighth vs two eighths), and whatever they apply to can be singular or plural (e.g., three-quarters of the apple(s)), depending on whether it refers to a fraction of a single item or many items.

==== Equivalent to zero is usually plural ====
Any zero quantity can be plural or singular, though plural is the default. So the following plurals are standard.

- We have no bananas.
- We have zero bananas.
- We don't have any bananas.

However, if it has already been established that one item was in question, one can use no to deny that such an item exists in the singular:

- "Can you pass me the banana on your desk?" "There's no banana on my desk."

=== Interrogative pronouns ===
The interrogative pronouns who and what generally take singular agreement, e.g.

- Who works there?

In some cases, a plural verb can be used when the answer is expected to be plural

- What have big ears and trunks?

When followed by a plural predicative complement, a plural verb must be used:

- What are the main reasons?

not

- *What is the main reasons?

Following which, a singular verb suggests a singular answer, and a plural verb suggests a plural answer:

- Which of these answers is correct? (single choice)
- Which of these answers are correct? (multiple choice)

When asking How many?, plural is standard (e.g. How many bananas? not *How many banana?), even if the expected answer is only one.

=== Determiners ===
Many determiners are "indifferent as to the number of the head" noun, while others are selective. The following determiners select a plural head: both, several, many, few, a few, you, we and all cardinal numerals except one. Along with these, a/an and another are compatible with quantified plurals (e.g., another five days but not *another days).

=== Adjectives ===
A number of adjectives are used primarily with plural nouns. These include numerous and countless, though singular examples like a numerous class or a countless multitude are also possible.

== See also ==
- English verbs
- English personal pronouns
- Count noun
- Mass noun
- Singular they
