= Devadatta (disambiguation) =

Devadatta is the cousin of the Buddha and known for exemplifying the sin of schism in Buddhism.

Devadatta, Devdatta or Devdutt may also refer to:

== Religion ==
- The name of the conch shell used by Arjuna on the Kurukshetra battle-field in the Bhagavad Gītā
- The name of Kalki's white horse
- One of the five upaprāṇas among the ten prānas

== People ==
- Devdutt Anand (1923–2011), better known as Dev Anand, Indian actor
- Devdatta Dabholkar (1919–2010), Indian educationist and socialist
- Devdatt Kumar Kikabhai Patel, Indian politician
- Devdatta Nage, Indian actor
- Devdutt Padikkal (born 2000), Indian cricketer
- Devdutt Pattanaik (born 1970), Indian writer
- Devadatta Ramakrishna Bhandarkar (1875–1950), Indian archaeologist
- Devdatta Sable, Indian musician
- Devadatta Shastri, commentator on the Kama Sutra
- V. Devadatta, Indian film director; see Psycho
- Devadatta Joardar, translator; see Joe Winter
- Deva-datta, a character in the 11th-century Indian story collection Shringara-manjari-katha

== Other ==
- Devadatta (damselfly), genus
- A character in the tokusatsu film Warrior of Love Rainbowman

== See also ==
- Deva (disambiguation)
- Datta (disambiguation)
- Ramkisoen Dewdat Oedayrajsing Varma (1907–1968), Indo-Surinamese politician
