= Dhadha =

Dhadha may refer to:

- Dhadha Bujurg, a village in Uttar Pradesh, India
- Dhadha Daulatpur, a village in Punjab, India
- Shamsa Dhadha, a town in Gujranwala District, Punjab, India

== See also ==
- Dada (disambiguation)
- Dhada, a 2011 Indian Telugu-language film
