= Tatu (disambiguation) =

Tatu, or t.A.T.u., is a Russian pop music girl duo.

Tatu may also refer to:

== People ==
- Tatú (footballer, 1898-1932), full name Altino Marcondes, Brazilian footballer
- Tatu (soccer) (Antonio Carlos Pecorari, born 1962), a Brazilian footballer
- Tatu Baby (born 1987), American tattoo artist
- Tatu Chionga (born 1944), a Malawian boxer
- Tatu Kolehmainen (1885–1967), a Finnish long-distance runner
- Tatu Mäkelä (born 1988), a Finnish footballer
- Tatu Malmivaara (1908–1987), a Finnish clergyman and politician
- Tatu Miettunen (born 1995), a Finnish footballer
- Tatu Nissinen (1883–1966), a Finnish agronomist and politician
- Tatu Sinisalo (born 1992), Finnish actor
- Tatu Vanhanen (1929–2015), a Finnish political scientist and author
- Tatu Varmanen (born 1998), a Finnish footballer
- Cornel Tatu (born 1983), a Romanian rugby player
- Leandro Tatu (Leandro Ângelo Martins, born 1982), a Brazilian footballer
- Utpal S. Tatu (born 1964), an Indian biologist

== Places ==
- Ţaţu, Cornereva, Romania
- Tatu River, or Dadu River, in Taiwan
- Khanbaliq, or Tatu or Dadu, capital of the Yuan dynasty in present day Beijing, China

== Other uses ==
- Tatu (film), a 2017 Nigerian adventure film
- Tatu (instrument), or Charango, a small Andean stringed instrument of the lute family
- Tatu, the name of a chimpanzee at the Chimpanzee and Human Communication Institute

== See also ==
- Dadu (disambiguation)
- Tattoo, a form of body modification
- Tatu (animal), name of Armadillo in Brazilian Portuguese
  - Tatu-bola, known as Brazilian three-banded armadillo
  - Giant armadillo (Priodontes maximus), colloquially tatou
- Tatou
