= Lasiosceles =

Lasiosceles is a synonym of two or three genera of moths, all in the superfamily Noctuoidea:

- Lasiosceles Hampson, 1909 is a synonym of
  - Scelilasia Hampson, 1914 or
  - Gymnelia Walker, 1854
- Lasiosceles Bethune-Baker, 1906 is a synonym of Data Walker, 1862
