= Plural =

Grammatical number

In many languages, a plural (sometimes abbreviated as pl., pl, PL., or PL), is one of the values of the grammatical category of number. The plural of a noun typically denotes a quantity greater than the default quantity represented by that noun. This default quantity is most commonly one (a form that represents this default quantity of one is said to be of singular number). Therefore, plurals most typically denote two or more of something, although they may also denote fractional, zero or negative amounts. An example of a plural is the English word boys, which corresponds to the singular boy.

Words of other types, such as verbs, adjectives and pronouns, also frequently have distinct plural forms, which are used in agreement with the number of their associated nouns.

Some languages also have a dual (denoting exactly two of something) or other systems of number categories. However, in English and many other languages, singular and plural are the only grammatical numbers, except for possible remnants of dual number in pronouns such as both and either, and in tendency for stock phrases to use "two" as an umbrella term for "many" (eg "double jeopardy" includes prosecuting a person three, four or a dozen times on the same charge).

== Use in systems of grammatical number ==
In many languages, there is also a dual number (used for indicating two objects). Some other grammatical numbers present in various languages include trial (for three objects) and paucal (for an imprecise but small number of objects). In languages with dual, trial, or paucal numbers, plural refers to numbers higher than those. However, numbers besides singular, plural, and (to a lesser extent) dual are extremely rare. Languages with numerical classifiers such as Chinese and Japanese lack any significant grammatical number at all, though they are likely to have plural personal pronouns.

Some languages (like Mele-Fila) distinguish between a plural and a greater plural. A greater plural refers to an abnormally large number for the object of discussion. The distinction between the paucal, the plural, and the greater plural is often relative to the type of object under discussion. For example, in discussing oranges, the paucal number might imply fewer than ten, whereas for the population of a country, it might be used for a few hundred thousand.

The Austronesian languages of Sursurunga and Lihir have extremely complex grammatical number systems, with singular, dual, paucal, greater paucal, and plural.

Traces of the dual and paucal can be found in some Slavic and Baltic languages (apart from those that preserve the dual number, such as Slovene). These are known as "pseudo-dual" and "pseudo-paucal" grammatical numbers. For example, Polish and Russian use different forms of nouns with the numerals 2, 3, or 4 (and higher numbers ending with these) than with the numerals 5, 6, etc. (genitive singular in Russian and nominative plural in Polish in the former case, genitive plural in the latter case). Also some nouns may follow different declension patterns when denoting objects which are typically referred to in pairs. For example, in Polish, the noun "oko", among other meanings, may refer to a human or animal eye or to a drop of oil on water. The plural of "oko" in the first meaning is "oczy" (even if actually referring to more than two eyes), while in the second it is "oka" (even if actually referring to exactly two drops).

Traces of dual can also be found in Modern Hebrew. Biblical Hebrew had grammatical dual via the suffix -ạyim as opposed to ־ים -īm for masculine words. Contemporary use of a true dual number in Hebrew is chiefly used in words regarding time and numbers. However, in Biblical and Modern Hebrew, the pseudo-dual as plural of "eyes" עין / עינים ʿạyin / ʿēnạyim "eye / eyes" as well as "hands", "legs" and several other words are retained. For further information, see Dual (grammatical number) § Hebrew.

Certain nouns in some languages have the unmarked form referring to multiple items, with an inflected form referring to a single item. These cases are described with the terms collective number and singulative number. Some languages may possess a massive plural and a numerative plural, the first implying a large mass and the second implying division (like the English modifer "respective[ly]"). For example, "the [combined] waters of the Atlantic Ocean" versus, "the waters of [each of] the Great Lakes [respectively]".

Ghil'ad Zuckermann uses the term superplural to refer to massive plural. He argues that the Australian Aboriginal Barngarla language has four grammatical numbers: singular, dual, plural and superplural. For example:

- wárraidya "emu" (singular)
- wárraidyalbili "two emus" (dual)
- wárraidyarri "emus" (plural)
- wárraidyailyarranha "a lot of emus", "heaps of emus" (superplural)

== Formation of plurals ==
A given language may make plural forms of nouns by various types of inflection, including the addition of affixes, like the English -(e)s and -ies suffixes, or ablaut, as in the derivation of the plural geese from goose, or a combination of the two. Some languages may also form plurals by reduplication, but not as productively. It may be that some nouns are not marked for plural at all, like sheep and series in English. In languages which also have a case system, such as Latin and Russian, nouns can have not just one plural form but several, corresponding to the various cases. The inflection might affect multiple words, not just the noun; the noun itself need not become plural as such, with other parts of the expression indicating the plurality.

In English, the most common formation of plural nouns is by adding an -s suffix to the singular noun. (For details and different cases, see English plurals.) Just like in English, noun plurals in French, Spanish, and Portuguese are also typically formed by adding an -s suffix to the lemma form, sometimes combining it with an additional vowel. (In French, however, this plural suffix is often not pronounced.) This construction is also found in German and Dutch, but only in some nouns. Suffixing is cross-linguistically the most common method of forming plurals.

In Welsh, the reference form, or default quantity, of some nouns is plural, and the singular form is formed from it, e.g., llygod, mice -> llygoden, mouse; erfin, turnips -> erfinen, turnip.

== Plural forms of other parts of speech ==
In many languages, words other than nouns may take plural forms, these being used by way of grammatical agreement with plural nouns (or noun phrases). Such a word may in fact have a number of plural forms, to allow for simultaneous agreement within other categories such as case, person and gender, as well as marking of categories belonging to the word itself (such as tense of verbs, degree of comparison of adjectives, etc.)

Verbs often agree with their subject in number (as well as in person and sometimes gender). Examples of plural forms are the French mangeons, mangez, mangent – respectively the first-, second- and third-person plural of the present tense of the verb manger. In English a distinction is made in the third person between forms such as eats (singular) and eat (plural).

Adjectives may agree with the noun they modify; examples of plural forms are the French petits and petites (the masculine plural and feminine plural respectively of petit). The same applies to some determiners – examples are the French plural definite article les, and the English demonstratives these and those.

It is common for pronouns, particularly personal pronouns, to have distinct plural forms. Examples in English are we (us, etc.) and they (them etc.; see English personal pronouns), and again these and those (when used as demonstrative pronouns).

In Welsh, a number of common prepositions also inflect to agree with the number, person, and sometimes gender of the noun or pronoun they govern.

== Nouns lacking plural or singular form ==
Certain nouns do not form plurals. A large class of such nouns in many languages is that of uncountable nouns, representing mass or abstract concepts such as air, information, physics. However, many nouns of this type also have countable meanings or other contexts in which a plural can be used; for example water can take a plural when it means water from a particular source (different waters make for different beers) and in expressions like by the waters of Babylon.

Certain collective nouns do not have a singular form and exist only in the plural, such as "clothes".

There are also nouns found exclusively or almost exclusively in the plural, such as the English scissors. These are referred to with the term plurale tantum. Occasionally, a plural form can pull double duty as the singular form (or vice versa), as has happened with the word "data".

== Usage of the plural ==
The plural is used, as a rule, for quantities other than one (and other than those quantities represented by other grammatical numbers, such as dual, which a language may possess). Thus it is frequently used with numbers higher than one (two cats, 101 dogs, four and a half hours) and for unspecified amounts of countable things (some men, several cakes, how many lumps?, birds have feathers). The precise rules for the use of plurals, however, depends on the language – for example Russian uses the genitive singular rather than the plural after certain numbers (see above).

Treatments differ in expressions of zero quantity: English often uses the plural in such expressions as no injuries and zero points, although no (and zero in some contexts) may also take a singular. In French, the singular form is used after zéro.

English also tends to use the plural with decimal fractions, even if less than one, as in 0.3 metres, 0.9 children. Common fractions less than one tend to be used with singular expressions: half (of) a loaf, two-thirds of a mile. Negative numbers are usually treated the same as the corresponding positive ones: minus one degree, minus two degrees. Again, rules on such matters differ between languages.

In some languages, including English, expressions that appear to be singular in form may be treated as plural if they are used with a plural sense, as in the government are agreed. The reverse is also possible: the United States is a powerful country. See synesis, and also English plural § Singulars as plural and plurals as singular.

== POS tagging ==
In part-of-speech tagging notation, tags are used to distinguish different types of plurals based on their grammatical and semantic context. Resolution varies, for example the Penn-Treebank tagset (~36 tags) has two tags: NNS - noun, plural, and NPS - Proper noun, plural, while the CLAWS 7 tagset (~149 tags) uses six: NN2 - plural common noun, NNL2 - plural locative noun, NNO2 - numeral noun, plural, NNT2 - temporal noun, plural, NNU2 - plural unit of measurement, NP2 - plural proper noun.

== See also ==
- Double plural
- Homogeneity (linguistics)
- Partitive plural
- Plural quantification
- Pluractionality
- Pluralis majestatis
- Reduplicated plural
- Romance plurals
