= Codata =

Codata, Co-data or CODATA may refer to:

- Committee on Data for Science and Technology, publishers of the CODATA recommended values of physical constants
- Coinductively defined data types in computer science
- CoData (company), a former computer hard disk start-up from Colorado, then merged in Conner Peripherals.

== See also ==
- Data (disambiguation)
