= Dadagiri (disambiguation) =

Dadagiri (lit. 'gangsterism') may refer to:

- Dadagiri (film), a 1987 Indian Hindi-language film
- Daadagiri, a 1997 Indian Hindi-language film
- Devudu Chesina Manushulu (2012 film), a 2012 Indian Telugu-language film, released in Hindi as Dadagiri
- Maanagaram, a 2017 Indian Tamil-language film, released in Hindi as Dadagiri 2
- Dadagiri (Hindi TV series), an Indian Hindi-language TV series which ran from 2008–2011
- Dadagiri Unlimited, an Indian Bengali-language quiz show on air since 2009

== See also ==
- Dada (disambiguation)
