= Datta =

Datta may refer to:

- Dutta (surname), an Indian family name found among Bengali and Punjabi Hindus
- Dattatreya, a Hindu deity
- Datta, Mansehra, a Union Council in Mansehra District, Pakistan
- Data, Hisar or Datta, a village in Haryana, India
- Datta High School, a higher secondary school in the city of Netrakona, Bangladesh
- Datta (1951 film), an Indian Bengali-language film based on the story of Sarat Chandra Chattopadhyay, remade in 1976
- Datta (2023 film), an Indian Bengali language film

== See also ==
- Dutt (disambiguation)
