= Da Da Da (disambiguation) =

"Da Da Da" is a 1982 song by the German band Trio.

Da Da Da may also refer to:

- Da! Da! Da!, or UFO Baby, a shōjo comedy manga by Mika Kawamura
- Da Da Da (album), by Maki Ohguro (1983)
- "Da Da Da", a song by Lil Wayne from his 2009 album Rebirth
- "Da, Da, Da", a song by Prince from his 1996 album Emancipation

== See also ==
- Dada (disambiguation)
- Da da da dum, Beethoven's 5th Symphony
- "De Do Do Do, De Da Da Da", song by The Police (1980)
- "Din Daa Daa", song by George Kranz (1983)
