= Dadu =

Dadu may refer to:

== Places ==
- Dadu (Beijing) or Khanbaliq, capital of the Yuan dynasty; in modern Beijing
- Dadu, Sirsa, a village in Haryana, India
- Dadu District, Sindh, Pakistan
  - Dadu, Pakistan, a town in Dadu District
  - Dadu railway station (Pakistan)
  - Dadu Taluka
- Dadu, Taichung, Taiwan
  - Dadu Plateau
  - Dadu railway station (Taichung)
  - Kingdom of Middag, also known as the Kingdom of Dadu

== Rivers ==
- Dadu River, a tributary of the Yangtze, in Sichuan province, China
- Dadu River (Taiwan), also known as the "Wu River"

== People ==
- Dadu Dayal (1544–1603), Indian devotional poet-guru
- Dadu Mahendranath Singh (fl. 1951–1957), Indian politician
- Sergiu Dadu (born 1981), Moldovan footballer

== Other uses ==
- Dadu cricket team, based in Dadu, Pakistan
- Amarjeet Kapoor "Dadu", fictional character in the 2016 Indian film Kapoor & Sons, played by Rishi Kapoor
- Dadu No. 1, a 2004 Indian film

== See also ==
- Dada (disambiguation)
