= Tatou =

Tatou may refer to:

- Colette Tatou, a fictional character from the 2007 Disney/Pixar animated film Ratatouille
- Tatou Tapatoru's ezine, Bi monthly ezine from Tapatoru for Maori trans who live or have lived in Wellington New Zealand
- Tatou or Giant Armadillo, the largest species of armadillo
  - Tatou, French for Armadillo
- Tatou (town) (塔头镇), town in Jiexi County, Guangdong, China
- "Tatou Strip Tease", a Dusty Fingers track from their Dusty Fingers Volume 15 album

== See also ==
- Audrey Tautou (born 1978), French film actress
- Tautou, a song by Brand New
- Tatu (disambiguation) § See also
