= Daata =

Daata may refer to:

- Daata (film), a 1989 Indian Hindi-language action drama film
- Daata (restaurant), a Pakistani restaurant chain in Ireland
