= Dada (disambiguation) =

Dada, or Dadaism, was an early 20th century art movement

Dada may also refer to:

== Film ==
- Dada (1979 film), a Hindi film starring Vinod Mehra and Bindiya Goswami
- Dada (2023 film), an Indian Tamil-language film
- Dádá, original Chinese title of Dada's Dance, a 2008 film directed by Zhang Yuan
- Division of Animation and Digital Arts, University of Southern California School of Cinematic Arts

== Music ==
- Dada (band), a three piece rock band formed in Los Angeles
  - Dada (album), their 1998 album
- DaDa, a 1983 album by Alice Cooper
- "Dada" (song), a 2011 single by Japanese rock band Radwimps
- Dada, a band that evolved into Vinegar Joe, and their 1970 album Dada
- DaDa, a 2011 album by Polish band Blue Café
- DADA, a stage name of musician Matt Schwartz

== People ==
- Idi Amin Dada (1928–2003), former president of Uganda
- Dada 5000 (Dhafir Harris, born 1977), American fighter
- Dada Salvi (1904–1980), Indian actor
- Dada Dharmadhikari (1899–1985), Indian freedom fighter and social reformer
- Dada Kondke (1932–1998), Indian actor
- Dadá Maravilha, Dario José dos Santos (born 1943), Brazilian retired footballer
- Sourav Ganguly (born 1972), known as Dada, former Indian cricketer
- Mithun Chakraborty (born 1950), Indian actor, nicknamed "Dada" in Bollywood
- Dada Amir Haider Khan (c. 1900–1989), communist activist and revolutionary in India and Pakistan
- Isabel Dada (1941–2017), Salvadoran actress
- Maqbool Dada, American academic
- Sant Mekan Dada (1667–1730), a Kapdi saint from India
- Nayyar Ali Dada (born 1943), Pakistani architect

== Other uses ==
- Dada, a Yoruba child with natural dreadlocks of hair, known as an oruko amutorunwa
- Dada, Dursunbey, a village in Turkey
- Dada Mail, mailing list software
- Diisopropylamine dichloroacetate, a chemical compound used for treating liver conditions, abbreviated as DADA

== See also ==
- Da Da Da (disambiguation)
- Dhadha
- Data (disambiguation)
- Dadu (disambiguation)
- Dadagiri (disambiguation)
- Daada, a 1988 Indian Kannada film
- Dadha, a 1994 Malayalam film
- Dhada, a 2011 Indian Telugu-language film
- Aaj Ka Dada, Hindi title of the 1984 Indian Tamil film Thanikattu Raja
- Pandurang Shastri Athavale (1920–2003), Indian activist and philosopher, also known as Dadaji
- Father in many languages; see Mama and papa
