= Devdatt Kumar Kikabhai Patel =

Indian politician

Devdatt Kumar Kikabhai Patel (1938–2001) was a leader of Bharatiya Janata Party from Gujarat. He was a member of Rajya Sabha from 1970 to 1976. Patel was elected to Gujarat Legislative Assembly in 1998 from Mahuva.
