= Datta, Mansehra =

Coordinates: 34°17′N 73°15′E

Datta
- Union council and town
- Interactive map of Datta
- Country: Pakistan
- Region: Khyber-Pakhtunkhwa
- District: Mansehra District

Population
  - Total: about 5,000 to 15,000 Tehsil Member =Asad Ali Shah
- Time zone: UTC+5 (PST)
- pre: 21300
- Area code: 21312

Datta is a village and union council (an administrative subdivision) of Mansehra District in the Khyber-Pakhtunkhwa province of Pakistan. It is surrounded by Haryala village from north west, Khushala village from north, Chikia and pengal village from west and lodia abad tandan village from south. It is in Mansehra Tehsil.

Asad Ali Shah is the councillor in Datta.
