= Datum (disambiguation) =

Datum is, from its Latin origin, a singular form of "data", and may refer to a single item of data.

== Singular data point ==
- Datum reference, in carpentry, metalworking, needlework, geometric dimensioning and tolerancing
- Vertical datum, reference surface for vertical positions
- Geodetic datum, a standard position or level that measurements are taken from in geographic surveying
- Chart datum, level of water depth on a nautical chart
- Zero milepost, an origin for travel distances

== Publications ==
- Datum (magazine), an Austrian monthly magazine
- Omne Datum Optimum ("Every perfect gift"), a papal bull issued by Pope Innocent II in 1139 endorsing the Knights Templar

== Geography ==
- Datum Peak, New Zealand
- Datum (Greece), a city in ancient Macedonia
