= Shamsa Dhadha =

Town and Union Council in Nowshera Virkan Tehsil

Shamsa Dhadha شمسہ دھدھا Shamsa Dhadda
- Town
- Location of Shamsa Dhadha Shamsa Dhadha (Pakistan)
- Coordinates: 31.8439525°N 73.9979178°E
- Country: Pakistan
- Province: Punjab
- District: Gujranwala
- Tehsil: Nowshera Virkan
- Number of Union Councils: 1

Area
  - Total: 1.35 sq mi (3.50 km^{2})

Population
  - Estimate (2017): 4,463
- Time zone: UTC+05:00 (Pakistan Standard Time)
- Calling code: 055

Shamsa Dhadha (Urdu: شمسہ دھدھا), also spelled as Shamsa Dhadda, is a town and union council in Nowshera Virkan Tehsil, Gujranwala District, Punjab, Pakistan.

== See also ==
- Gujranwala
- Wazirabad
- Kamoke
- Nowshera Virkan
