= Microdata =

Microdata can mean:

- Microdata (statistics), a statistical term for individual response data in surveys and censuses
- Microdata (HTML), a specification for semantic markup in HTML
- Microdata Corporation, a California-based computer company
