= Dhadha Bujurg =

Village in Uttar Pradesh, India

- Ward (formerly Village)
- Interactive map of Dhadha Bujurg
- Coordinates: 26°44′21.5″N 83°42′21.6″E
- Country: India
- State: Uttar Pradesh
- District: Kushinagar
- Elevation: 44 m (144 ft)
- Time zone: UTC+5:30 (IST)
- Postal code: 274207
- Vehicle registration: UP-57

Dhadha Bujurg is a neighborhood located in the Hata region of the Kushinagar district, Uttar Pradesh, India. Formerly an independent village, it was merged into the Hata Nagarpalika (Municipal Council) in 2017 and is currently designated as Ward 12, Shardha Nagar.

== Geography ==
The locality is situated near National Highway 27 (NH 27), which serves as a primary transport artery in the region. It lies approximately 3 km from Hata, 18 km from Kushinagar, and 4 km from Shukrauli 28 km away from Gorakhpur.

== History ==
The area has historical roots documented in colonial-era British administration records. According to the Gorakhpur District Gazetteers (Vol. 31, 1921), Babu Dwarikhadhish Singh, a legal magistrate of Hata Tehsil, served as the primary landlord for Dhadha Bujurg and eleven other surrounding settlements, including Dhadha Khurd and Harpur Baldhiya Bhadngwa Jewnarha. The area maintains a long-standing educational legacy, with its government primary school established in 1923.

== Education ==
There are several schools and colleges located in this gram panchayat:

- Sharda Devi Memorial School(est 1986) Now Close
- Sant Kabir Children School (est 2002)
- Middle School Dhadha Khurd (est 1962)
- Sant Pushpa intermediate College (est 1992)
- Rajkiy Maha Vidyalaya
- Primary School Dhadha Bujurg (est 1923) School
