= Daata (restaurant) =

Pakistani restaurant chain in Ireland

- Daata in Blackrock, Dublin

Restaurant information
- Established: 1999
- Head chef: Fahad Saleem
- Food type: Pakistani cuisine
- Location: Leinster, Ireland
- Website: daata.ie

Daata, originally Daata Tandoori, is a Pakistani restaurant chain in Ireland. It has six locations; two in County Wicklow (Greystones and Bray), and four in Dublin (Blackrock, Glasthule, Sandymount, and South Great George's Street).

== History ==
Mohammed Saleem travelled from Faisalabad, Pakistan, where he operated food stalls, to Ireland in 1990 at 18 years old. he worked at the restaurant Shalimar on South Great George's Street, Dublin, which was Ireland's only Pakistani restaurant at the time. Daata was founded as a takeaway by Mohammed and Shamim Saleem in 1999. It was originally known as Daata Tandoori, and was located on Brennan's Parade lane in the town of Bray, County Wicklow. They moved to a larger establishment on Strand Road, Bray in 2013, and opened their second location in Greystones in 2017. A Glasthule location opened in 2021, a Blackrock one in 2023, and a Sandymount one in 2025, which are all in Southside, Dublin. All Daata locations except the George's Street one are on the Dublin Area Rapid Transit rail network.

Russell Alford and Patrick Hanlon, writing in The Times said that Daata didnt follow the trend of restaurants starting in Dublin city centre and branching out, instead starting in the suburbs and "inching" in.

== Awards ==
In 2022, Pakistan's ambassador to Ireland, Shuja Alam, gave the Bray location the honor of being the best Pakistani food he had in Ireland. At the 2026 Asian Restaurant Awards, Daata won five titles; the Best Pakistani Chef for Head Chef Rahat Waseem, the Best New Pakistani Restaurant for the George's street location, the Best Pakistani Restaurant in Leinster for the Bray location, the Best Pakistani Restaurant in Dublin for the Blackrock location, and the Outstanding Achievement Award for Director Waseem Saeed.

Year	Honor	Winner	Giver	Ref.
2026	Outstanding Achievement Award	Waseem Saeed	Asian Restaurant Awards	
2026	Best New Pakistani Restaurant	Daata South Great George's Street	Asian Restaurant Awards	
2026	Best Pakistani Restaurant in Leinster	Daata Bray	Asian Restaurant Awards	
2026	Best Pakistani Restaurant in Dublin	Daata Blackrock	Asian Restaurant Awards	
2026	Best Pakistani Chef	Rahat Waseem	Asian Restaurant Awards	
2025	Best Front of House Experience	Daata	Best in Taste Awards	
2025	Lifetime Achievement Award	Daata	Aisha Farooqui, Ambassador of Pakistan to Ireland	
2020	Best Takeaway (Vegetarian)	Daata	Just Eat Ireland National Takeaway Awards	
2018	Best Newcomer	Daata Greystones	Irish Curry Awards	
2018	Best Neighbourhood	Daata Bray	Irish Curry Awards	
