= Hypercorrection =

Non-standard language usage

In sociolinguistics, hypercorrection is the nonstandard use of language that results from the overapplication of a perceived rule of language-usage prescription. A speaker or writer who produces a hypercorrection generally believes through a misunderstanding of such rules that the form or phrase they use is more "correct", standard, or otherwise preferable, often combined with a desire to appear formal or educated.

Linguistic hypercorrection occurs when a real or imagined grammatical rule is applied in an inappropriate context, so that an attempt to be "correct" leads to an incorrect result. It does not occur when a speaker follows "a natural speech instinct", according to Otto Jespersen and Robert J. Menner.

Hypercorrection can be found among speakers of less prestigious language varieties who attempt to produce forms associated with high-prestige varieties, even in situations where speakers of those varieties would not. Some commentators call such production hyperurbanism.

Hypercorrection can occur in many languages and wherever multiple languages or language varieties are in contact.

== Types of overapplied rules ==
Studies in sociolinguistics and applied linguistics have noted the overapplication of rules of phonology, syntax, or morphology, resulting either from different rules in varieties of the same language or second-language learning. An example of a common hypercorrection based on application of the rules of a second (i.e. new, foreign) language is the use of octopi for the plural of octopus in English; this is based on the faulty assumption that octopus is a second declension word of Latin origin when in fact it is third declension and comes from Greek.

Sociolinguists often note hypercorrection in terms of pronunciation (phonology). For example, William Labov noted that all of the English speakers he studied in New York City in the 1960s tended to pronounce words such as hard as rhotic (pronouncing the "R" as /hɑːrd/ rather than /hɑːd/) more often when speaking carefully. Furthermore, middle class speakers had more rhotic pronunciation than working class speakers did.

However, lower-middle class speakers had more rhotic pronunciation than upper-middle class speakers. Labov suggested that these lower-middle class speakers were attempting to emulate the pronunciation of upper-middle class speakers, but were actually over-producing the very noticeable R-sound.

A common source of hypercorrection in English speakers' use of the language's morphology and syntax happens in the use of pronouns (see).

Hypercorrection can also occur when learners of a new-to-them (second, foreign) language try to avoid applying grammatical rules from their native language to the new language (a situation known as language transfer). The effect can occur, for example, when a student of a new language has learned that certain sounds of their original language must usually be replaced by another in the studied language, but has not learned when not to replace them.

In addition, the special case of a pseudo-hypercorrection has been identified where standard usage is at issue, but accidentally, i.e., where a speaker luckily produces a correct result.

== English ==
English has no authoritative body or language academy codifying norms for standard usage, unlike some other languages. Nonetheless, within groups of users of English, certain usages are considered unduly elaborate adherences to formal rules. Such speech or writing is sometimes called hyperurbanism, defined by Kingsley Amis as an "indulged desire to be posher than posh".

=== Personal pronouns ===
In 2004, Jack Lynch, assistant professor of English at Rutgers University, said on Voice of America that the correction of the subject-positioned "you and me" to "you and I" leads people to "internalize the rule that 'you and I' is somehow more proper, and they end up using it in places where they should not – such as 'he gave it to you and I' when it should be 'he gave it to you and me.'"

However, the linguists Rodney Huddleston and Geoffrey K. Pullum write that utterances such as "They invited Sandy and I" are "heard constantly in the conversation of people whose status as speakers of Standard English is clear" and that "[t]hose who condemn it simply assume that the case of a pronoun in a coordination must be the same as when it stands alone. Actual usage is in conflict with this assumption."

=== H-adding ===
Some British accents, such as Cockney, drop the initial h from words; e.g., have becomes 'ave. A hypercorrection associated with this is H-adding, adding an initial h to a word which would not normally have one. An immediate example is the name of the letter H itself. Another example of this can be found in the speech of the character Parker in the marionette TV series Thunderbirds, e.g., "We'll 'ave the haristocrats 'ere soon". Parker's speech was based on a real person the creators encountered at a restaurant in Cookham.

=== Hyperforeignism ===
Hyperforeignism arises from speakers misidentifying the distribution of a pattern found in loanwords and extending it to other environments. The result of this process does not reflect the rules of either language. For example, habanero is sometimes pronounced as though it were spelled "habañero", in imitation of other Spanish words like jalapeño and piñata. Machismo is sometimes pronounced "makizmo", apparently as if it were Italian, rather than the phonetic English pronunciation which resembles the original Spanish word, /mɑːˈtʃiz.mo/. Similarly, the z in chorizo is sometimes pronounced as /ts/ (as if it were Italian), whereas the original Spanish pronunciation has /θ/ or /s/.

=== English as a second language ===
Some English-Spanish cognates primarily differ by beginning with s instead of es, such as the English word spectacular and the Spanish word espectacular. A native Spanish speaker may conscientiously hypercorrect for the word escape by writing or saying scape, or for the word establish by writing or saying stablish, which is archaic, or an informal pronunciation in some dialects.

When learning English, German speakers often have trouble pronouncing [w] since the phoneme [w] is absent from German. The letter <w> also makes the [v] sound in German. After German speakers master the pronunciation of [w], some of them hypercorrect to incorrectly pronounce the [v] phoneme in English as [w] without realizing it.

=== Additional examples ===
- Using the verb affect in place of effect in cases where the intended meaning is "to bring about". The two terms can be pronounced very similarly, so English speakers may be taught (as a generalization) that affect is a verb whereas effect is a noun as a helpful rule-of-thumb when writing. However, effect is the appropriate choice in cases such as "to effect change", and affect can in rare cases function as a noun when referring to a person's observed emotional state.
- The misuse of adverbs in an attempt to modify linking verbs. One might say "She feels badly", believing that badly should be used since it follows a verb, and adverbs typically end in –ly. However, in this case, feels functions as a linking verb between subject and its descriptor, and thus the adjective form (i.e., bad) is appropriate.

== Chinese ==
Native speakers of southern Chinese varieties who learn Standard Mandarin Chinese often have trouble pronouncing the prestige variety's retroflex consonants, as these consonants are absent from southern varieties. As a result, in Singapore Mandarin, which is influenced by southern Chinese varieties, words with the phoneme /ʂ/ in Standard Mandarin are often realized as [s]. For words with /s/ in Standard Mandarin, Singaporean speakers also sometimes pronounce a hypercorrect realization with [ʂ], such as (in pinyin transliterations) shuǒyǐ for Standard Mandarin suǒyǐ (所以; 'so', 'therefore'). A study found that male speakers were more likely to produce these hypercorrect forms than female speakers.

== Serbo-Croatian ==
As the locative case is rarely found in vernacular usage in the southern and eastern dialects of Serbia, and the accusative is used instead, speakers tend to overcorrect when trying to deploy the standard variety of the language in more formal occasions, thus using the locative even when the accusative should be used (typically, when indicating direction rather than location): "Izlazim na kolovozu" instead of "izlazim na kolovoz".

== Hebrew and Yiddish ==
Ghil'ad Zuckermann argues that the following hypercorrect pronunciations in Israeli Hebrew are "snobbatives" (from snob + -ative, modelled upon comparatives and superlatives):

- the hypercorrect pronunciation khupím instead of khofím for חופים 'beaches'.
- the hypercorrect pronunciation tsorfát instead of tsarfát for צרפת 'France'.
- the hypercorrect pronunciation amán instead of omán for אמן 'artist'.

The last two hypercorrection examples derive from a confusion related to the kamatz gadol Hebrew vowel, which in the accepted Sephardi Hebrew pronunciation is rendered as /aː/ but which is pronounced /ɔ/ in Ashkenazi Hebrew, and in Hebrew words that also occur in Yiddish. However, the kamatz katan vowel, which is visually indistinguishable from kamatz gadol, is rendered as /o/ in both pronunciations. This leads to hypercorrections in both directions.

- The consistent pronunciation of all forms of qamatz as /a/, disregarding qatan and hataf forms, could be seen as hypercorrections when Hebrew speakers of Ashkenazic origin attempt to pronounce Sephardic Hebrew, for example, צָהֳרָיִם, 'midday' as tzaharayim, rather than tzohorayim as in standard Israeli pronunciation; the traditional Sephardi pronunciation is tzahorayim. This may, however, be an example of oversimplification rather than of hypercorrection.
- Conversely, many older British Jews consider it more colloquial and "down-home" to say Shobbes, cholla and motza, though the vowel in these words is in fact a patach, which is rendered as /a/ in both Sephardi and Ashkenazi Hebrew.

Other hypercorrections occur when speakers of Israeli Hebrew (which is based on Sephardic) attempt to pronounce Ashkenazi Hebrew, for example for religious purposes. The month of Shevat (שבט) is mistakenly pronounced Shvas, as if it were spelled *שְׁבַת. In an attempt to imitate Polish and Lithuanian dialects, qamatz (both gadol and qatan), which would normally be pronounced [ɔ], is hypercorrected to the pronunciation of holam, [ɔj], rendering גדול ('large') as goydl and ברוך ('blessed') as boyrukh.

== Spanish ==
In some Spanish dialects, the final intervocalic /d/ ([ð]) is dropped, such as in pescado (fish), which would typically be pronounced [pesˈkaðo] but can be manifested as [pesˈkao] dialectically. Speakers sensitive to this variation may insert a /d/ intervocalically into a word without such a consonant, such as in the case of bacalao (cod), correctly pronounced [bakaˈlao] but occasionally hypercorrected to [bakaˈlaðo].

Outside Spain and in Andalusia, the phonemes /θ/ and /s/ have merged, mostly into the realization [s] but ceceo, i.e. the pronunciation of both as [s̟], is found in some areas as well, primarily parts of Andalusia. Speakers of varieties that have [s] in all cases will frequently produce [θ] even in places where peninsular Spanish has [s] when trying to imitate a peninsular accent. As Spanish orthography distinguishes the two phonemes in all varieties, but the pronunciation is not differentiated in Latin American varieties, some speakers also get mixed up with the spelling.

Many Spanish dialects tend to aspirate syllable-final /s/, and some even elide it often. Since this phenomenon is somewhat stigmatized, some speakers in the Caribbean and especially the Dominican Republic may attempt to correct for it by pronouncing an /s/ where it does not belong. For example, catorce años '14 years' may be pronounced as catorces año.

== German ==
The East Franconian dialects are notable for lenition of stops /p/ /t/ /k/ to [b], [d], [g]. Thus, a common hypercorrection is the fortition of properly lenis stops, sometimes including aspiration as evidenced by the speech of Günther Beckstein.

The digraph ⟨ig⟩ in word-final position is pronounced [ɪç] per the Bühnendeutsch standard, but this pronunciation is frequently perceived as nonstandard and instead realized as [ɪɡ̊] or [ɪk] (final obstruent devoicing) even by speakers from dialect areas that pronounce the digraph [ɪç] or [ɪʃ].

Palatinate German language speakers are among those who pronounce both the digraph ⟨ch⟩ and the trigraph ⟨sch⟩ as [ʃ]. A common hypercorrection is to produce [ç] even where standard German has [ʃ] such as in Helmut Kohl's hypercorrect rendering of "Geschichte", the German word for "history" with a German pronunciation: [ç] both for the ⟨sch⟩ (standard German [ʃ]) and the ⟨ch⟩.

Proper names and German loanwords into other languages that have been reborrowed, particularly when they have gone through or are perceived to have gone through the English language are often pronounced "hyperforeign". Examples include "Hamburger" or the names of German-Americans and the companies named after them, even if they were or are first generation immigrants.

Some German speakers pronounce the metal umlaut as if it were a "normal" German umlaut. For example, when Mötley Crüe visited Germany, singer Vince Neil said the band could not figure out why "the crowds were chanting, 'Mutley Cruh! Mutley Cruh!'"

== Swedish ==
In Swedish, the word att is sometimes pronounced /ɔ/ when used as an infinitive marker (its conjunction homograph is never pronounced that way, however). The conjunction och is also sometimes pronounced the same way. Both pronunciations can informally be spelt å. ("Jag älskar å fiska å jag tycker också om å baka.") When spelt more formally, the infinitive marker /ˈɔ/ is sometimes misspelt och. (*"Få mig och hitta tillbaka.")

The third person plural pronoun, pronounced dom in many dialects, is formally spelt de in the subjective case and dem in the objective case. Informally it can be spelled dom ("Dom tycker om mig."), yet dom is only acceptable in the spoken language. When spelt more formally, they are often confused with each other. ("De tycker om mig." as a correct form, compared to *"Dem tycker om mig." as an incorrect form in this case). As an object form, using dem in a sentence would be correct in the sentence "Jag ger dem en present." ("I give them a gift.")

== See also ==
- Hypocorrection
- English usage controversies
- Eye dialect
- List of English words with disputed usage
- Mondegreen
- Regularization (linguistics)
- Shibboleth
- Szadzenie
