= Adata =

Adata may refer to:

- Adata, Greek name of Hadath
- Adata (Bulgarian: Адата), an island in the Maritsa River in the city of Plovdiv, Bulgaria
- ADATA, a Taiwanese hardware manufacturer
