= Dadu, Sirsa =

Dadu
- Village
- Location within Haryana Location within India
- Coordinates: 29°47′20″N 75°04′36″E
- Country: India
- State: Haryana
- District: Sirsa
- Tehsil: Kalanwali

Area
  - Total: 19.13 km^{2} (7.39 sq mi)
- Elevation: 206 m (676 ft)

Population (2011)
  - Total: 3,604
- Time zone: UTC+5:30 (IST)
- Postal Index Number: 125201

Dadu is a village located in Kalanwali tehsil of Sirsa District, Haryana, India. It is situated at 42 km north of its district capital Sirsa, and 8 km southeast of Kalanwali and 18 km from Takhat Sri Damdama Sahib. The village is near the northern edge of Haryana, and borders Bathinda District of Punjab to its north.

== Demographics ==
According to the 2011 Indian Census, Dadu has a total population of 3,604 people, of which 1,871 are male and 1,733 are female. The literacy rate of Dadu village is 53.88%, with 60.24% of the males and 47.03% of the females being literate. There are about 671 houses in Dadu.

Dadu village falls under Kalanwali Assembly Constituency and Sirsa Assembly Constituency. Kalanwali is the nearest town to Dadu for all major economic activities.

== Education ==
The village has a public senior secondary school, which was established as a primary school in 1949.

== Nearby villages ==
There are several villages near Dadu, including Dharmapura, Kewal, Takhatmal, Tilokewala, Pakka Shaheedhan, Khatawan, Taruana and Kamal. Its nearest towns are Kalanwali and Talwandi Sabo of Punjab.
