= Data (word) =

English word

The word data is most often used as a singular collective mass noun in educated everyday usage. However, due to the history and etymology of the word, considerable controversy has existed on whether it should be considered a mass noun used with verbs conjugated in the singular, or should be treated as the plural of the now-rarely-used datum.

== Usage in English ==
In one sense, data is the plural form of datum. Datum actually can also be a count noun with the plural datums (see usage in datum article) that can be used with cardinal numbers (e.g., "80 datums"); data (originally a Latin plural) is not used like a normal count noun with cardinal numbers and can be plural with plural determiners such as these and many, or it can be used as a mass noun with a verb in the singular form. Even when a very small quantity of data is referenced (one number, for example), the phrase piece of data is often used, as opposed to datum. The debate over appropriate usage continues, but "data" as a singular form is far more common.

In English, the word datum is still used in the general sense of "an item given". In cartography, geography, nuclear magnetic resonance and technical drawing, it is often used to refer to a single specific reference datum from which distances to all other data are measured. Any measurement or result is a datum, though data point is now far more common.

Data is indeed most often used as a singular mass noun in educated everyday usage. Some major newspapers, such as The New York Times, use it either in the singular or plural. In The New York Times, the phrases "the survey data are still being analyzed" and "the first year for which data is available" have appeared within one day. The Wall Street Journal explicitly allows this usage in its style guide. The Associated Press style guide classifies data as a collective noun that takes the singular when treated as a unit but the plural when referring to individual items (e.g., "The data is sound" and "The data have been carefully collected").

In scientific writing, data is often treated as a plural, as in These data do not support the conclusions, but the word is also used as a singular mass entity like information (e.g., in computing and related disciplines). British usage now widely accepts treating data as singular in standard English, including everyday newspaper usage at least in non-scientific use. UK scientific publishing still prefers treating it as a plural. Some UK university style guides recommend using data for both singular and plural use, and others recommend treating it only as a singular in connection with computers. The IEEE Computer Society allows usage of data as either a mass noun or plural based on author preference, while IEEE in the editorial style manual indicates to always use the plural form. Some professional organizations and style guides require that authors treat data as a plural noun. For example, the Air Force Flight Test Center once stated that the word data is always plural, never singular.

== See also ==
Data
