= Data, Hisar =

Datta
- Village
- Nickname: Datta city
- Location in Haryana, India Datta (India)
- Coordinates: 29.267°N 75.995°E
- Country: India
- State: Haryana
- District: Hisar

Government
  - Body: Gram panchayat Datta

Population (2007)
  - Total: 25,000

Languages
  - Official: Hindi, Haryanvi
- Time zone: UTC+5:30 (IST)
- PIN: 125049
- ISO 3166 code: IN-HR
- Vehicle registration: HR 21
- Website: www.hisar.nic.in

Datta (or Data) is a village in Hansi Tehsil, Hisar district, in Haryana, India. It is situated 36 km from Hisar city and 20 km from Hansi city on the road which also leads to Barwala. At Data there is another road that leads to Narnaund. It is 15 km from Narnaund Tehsil and only 16 km from Barwala town (where the Rajiv Gandhi Thermal Power Station is located). Datta comes under Roghi Khap Panchayat. There is an oil depot of HPCL situated on Bianakhera road.

== Demography ==
The village has a population of 25000, of which 12000 are female.

== Culture and religion ==
Data has an old Shiva temple and Akhara for sadhus (Hindu saints) as well as a village temple nearby, the Temple of Baba Lal Das where newly-weds go for blessings before entering the village. On every shukla 15 many people from all over India come for blessings. The religion practiced is Hindu and Muslim. The village has a large gausala (the biggest in north India). This was established in 1967 by a farmer. The gausala has nearly 1,100 acres (4.5 km^{2}) of land; it has also a big power plant of cost 4.5 crores. The yearly budget of the gausala is in crores.

== Geography ==
West of Data is desert land and the rest of the area around the village is fertile plain land, served by an irrigation canal. Data has twelve large ponds (Johad).

== Education ==
Datta has both a girls and a boys secondary government school. The village has a total of ten schools with three government run, and seven otherwise run. A girls' college is also situated in Datta, and Government College.

== Administration ==
Datta is an administrative unit and has panchayat samiti. It also has a Patwari (government land record officer) and ADO (Assistant Development Officer, for development of agricultural activities).

== Economy and agriculture ==
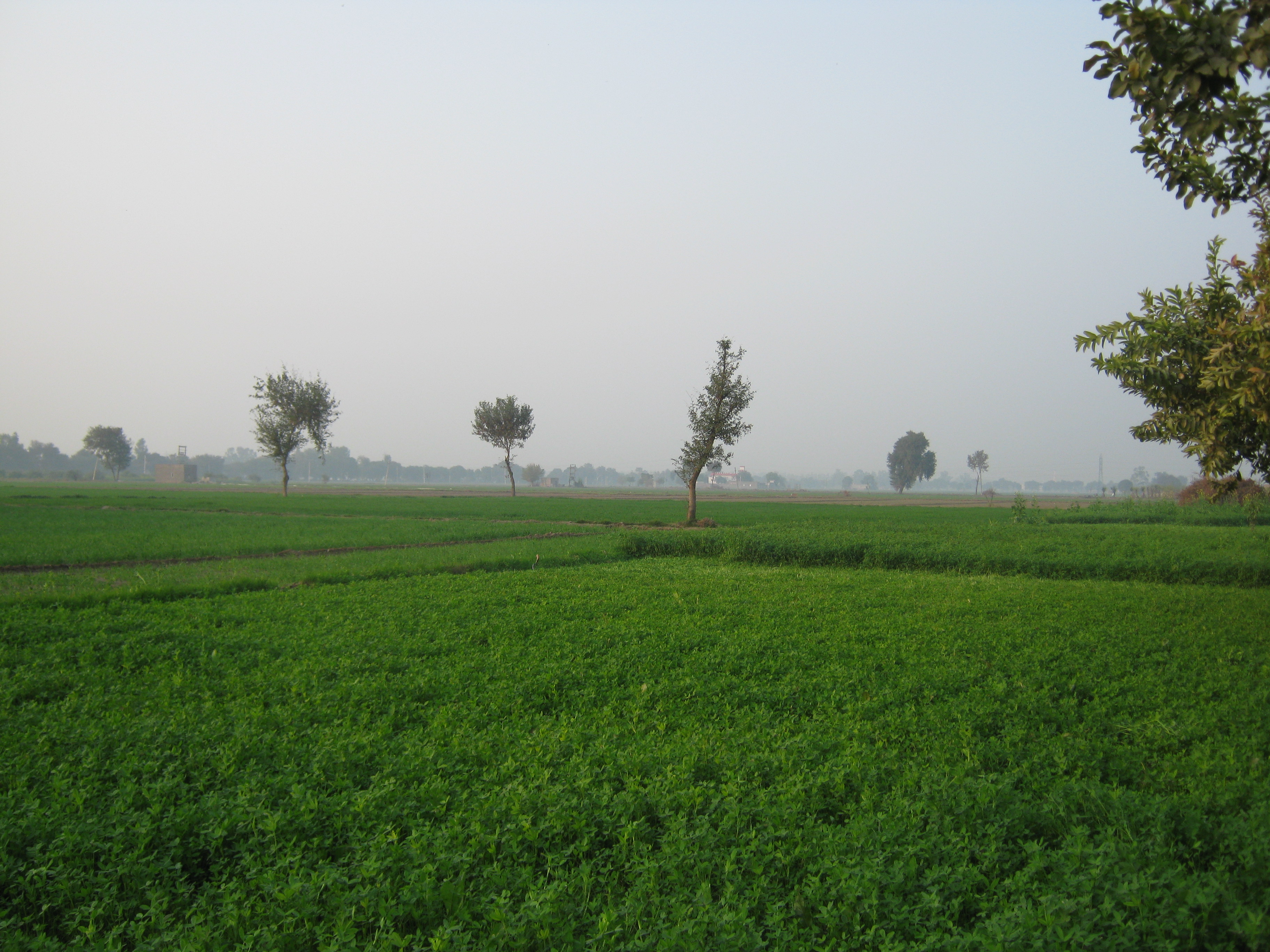
Green fields in Data

Despite recent industrial development, Haryana is primarily an agricultural state. About 70% of residents are engaged in agriculture. Wheat and rice are the major crops. Haryana is self-sufficient in food production and the second largest contributor to India's central pool of food grains. The main crops of Haryana are wheat, rice, sugarcane, cotton, oilseeds, pulses, barley, maize, and millet. There are two main types of crops in Haryana: Rabi and Kharif. The major Kharif crops of Haryana are rice, jowar, bajra, maize, cotton, jute, sugarcane, sesame and groundnut. For these crops the ground is prepared in April and May and the seeds are sown at the commencement of rains in June. The crops are ready for harvesting by the beginning of November. The major Rabi crops are wheat, tobacco, pulses, linseed, rapeseed and mustard. The ground is prepared by the end of October or the beginning of November and the crops are harvested by March.

About 86% of the area is arable, and of that 96% is cultivated. About 75% of the area is irrigated, through tube wells and an extensive system of canals. Data contributed significantly to the Green Revolution in India in the 1970s that made the country self-sufficient in food production.

Dairy farming is also an essential part of the rural economy. Data has a livestock population of 14000. Milk and milk products form an essential part of the local diet. There is the saying Desaan main des Haryana, jit doodh dahi ka khaana, which means "Best among all the countries in the world is Haryana, where the staple food is milk and yoghurt". Haryana, with 660 grams of availability of milk per capita per day, ranks at number two in the country as against the national average of 232 grams. There is a vast network of milk societies that support the dairy industry. The National Dairy Research Institute at Karnal, and the Central Institute for Research on Buffaloes at Hisar are instrumental in development of new breeds of cattle and propagation of these breeds through embryo transfer technology. The Murrah breed of water buffalo from Haryana is world-famous for its milk production.

== Climate ==
Datta

Climate chart (precipitation, max. and min. temperature)
J	F	M	A	M	J	J	A	S	O	N	D
13 21 6	16 25 8	12 31 14	5.6 37 19	20 41 24	43 41 28	141 37 27	147 35 26	65 35 24	15 34 18	6.1 29 11	7.3 24 7
- █ Average max. and min. temperatures in °C
- █ Precipitation totals in mm
- Source: IMD
Imperial conversion
J	F	M	A	M	J	J	A	S	O	N	D
0.5 71 42	0.6 76 47	0.5 87 57	0.2 98 67	0.8 105 76	1.7 106 82	5.5 99 81	5.8 95 79	2.6 96 75	0.6 94 64	0.2 84 52	0.3 74 44
- █ Average max. and min. temperatures in °F
- █ Precipitation totals in inches
