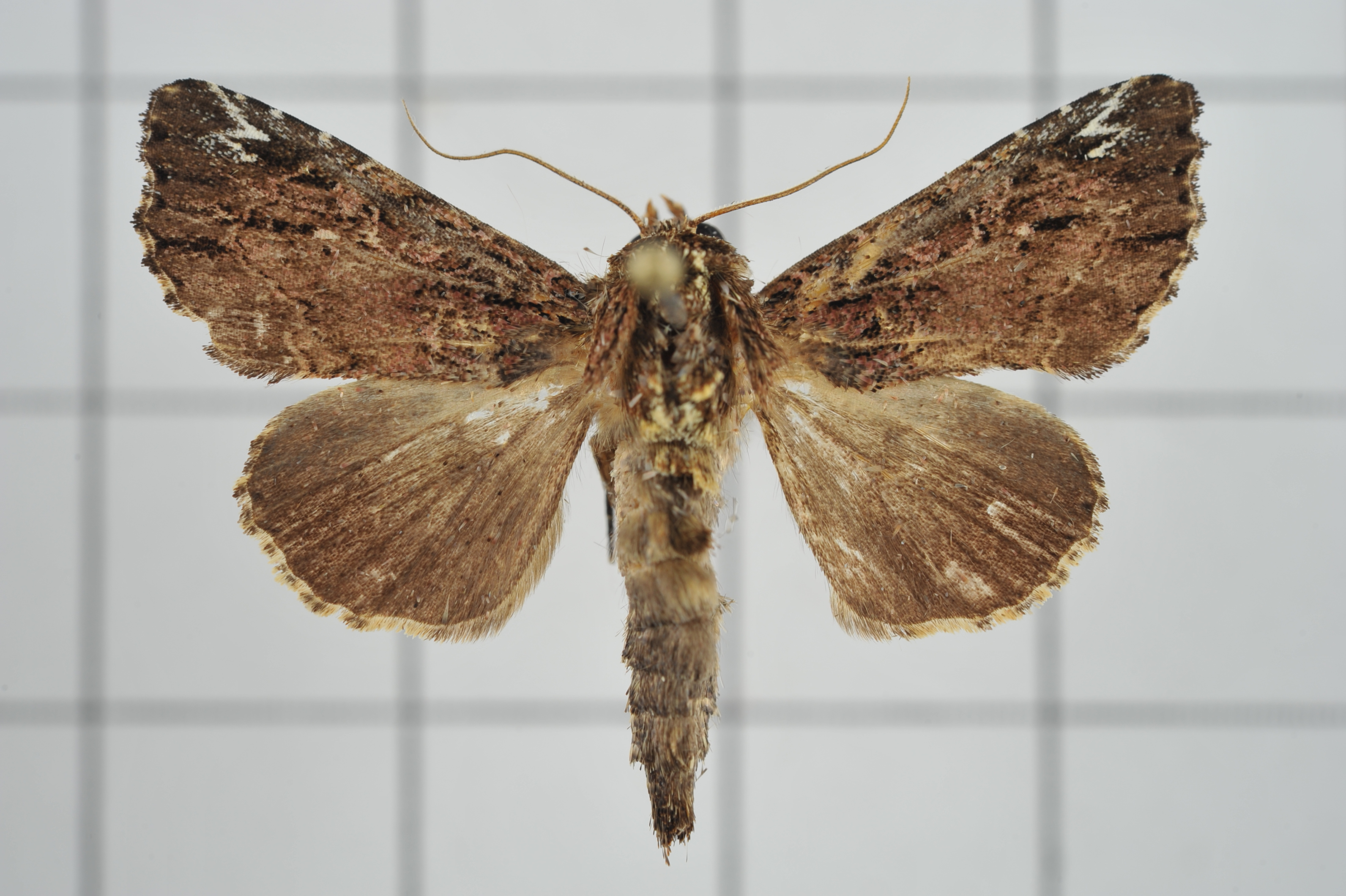
- Data clava

Scientific classification
- Kingdom: Animalia
- Phylum: Arthropoda
- Class: Insecta
- Order: Lepidoptera
- Superfamily: Noctuoidea
- Family: Noctuidae
- Genus: Data; Walker, 1862

= Data (moth) =

Genus of moths

Data is a genus of moths of the family Noctuidae.

== Species ==
- Data aroa (Bethune-Baker, 1906)
- Data callopistrioides (Moore, 1881)
- Data clava (Leech, 1900)
- Data dissimilis Warren, 1911
- Data eriopoides Prout, 1928
- Data manta (Swinhoe, 1902)
- Data obliterata Warren, 1911
- Data ochroneura (Turner, 1943)
- Data pratti (Bethune-Baker, 1906)
- Data rectisecta Warren, 1912
- Data rhabdochlaena Wileman & West, 1929
- Data thalpophiloides Walker, 1862
- Data variegata (Swinhoe, 1895)
