= Attractor (disambiguation) =

Attractor is a feature of some dynamic systems.

It may also refer to:

- Great Attractor, a gravity anomaly in intergalactic space
- Fishing light attractor, a fishing aid
- Bug attractor, in insect eradication
- "Attractor", a song by the American band Bright from the album The Albatross Guest House
- Evolutionary attractor, a tendency in evolution

== See also ==
- Attract (disambiguation)
- Tractor (disambiguation)
- Strange Attractor (disambiguation)
