= American and British English grammatical differences =

Some of the most notable differences between American English and British English are grammatical.

== Subject–verb agreement ==
In British English (BrE), collective nouns can take either singular (formal agreement) or plural (notional agreement) verb forms, according to whether the emphasis is on the body as a whole or on the individual members, respectively; compare a committee was appointed with the committee were unable to agree. Compare also the following lines of Elvis Costello's song "Oliver's Army": Oliver's Army is here to stay / Oliver's Army are on their way. Some of these nouns, for example staff, actually combine with plural verbs most of the time.

In American English (AmE), collective nouns are almost always singular in construction: the committee was unable to agree. However, when a speaker wishes to emphasize that the individuals are acting separately, a plural pronoun may be employed with a singular or plural verb: the team takes their seats, rather than the team takes its seats. Such a sentence would most likely be recast as the team members take their seats. With exceptions such as usage in The New York Times, the names of sports teams are usually treated as plurals even if the form of the name is singular.

The difference occurs for all nouns of multitude, both general terms such as team and company and proper nouns (for example where a place name is used to refer to a sports team). For instance,

BrE: SuperHeavy is a band that shouldn't work or First Aid Kit are a band full of contradictions; AmE: The Clash is a well-known band.
BrE: FC Red Bull Salzburg is an Austrian association football club; AmE: The New York Red Bulls are an American soccer team.

== Verbs ==
=== Verb morphology ===
- The past tense and past participle of the verbs learn, spoil, spell, burn, dream, smell, spill, leap, and others, can be formed with -t (learnt, spoilt, etc.) or with the regular -ed (learned, spoiled, etc.). In BrE, both irregular and regular forms are current, but for some words (such as smelt and leapt) there is a strong tendency towards the irregular forms. For other words (such as dreamed, leaned, and learned) the regular forms are somewhat more common.
  The t endings may be encountered frequently in older American texts, especially poetry. Usage may vary when the past participles are used as adjectives, as in burnt toast. (The two-syllable form learnèd /ˈlɜːrnɪd/, usually written without the accent, is used as an adjective to mean "educated" or to refer to academic institutions in both BrE and AmE.) Finally, the past tense and past participle of dwell and kneel are more commonly dwelt and knelt in both standards, with dwelled and kneeled as common variants in the US but not in the UK.
- Lit as the past tense of light is more common than lighted in the UK; American English uses lit to mean "set afire" / "kindled" / "made to emit light" but lighted to mean "cast light upon" (e.g., "The stagehand lighted the set and then lit a cigarette."). Conversely, British English favors fitted as the past tense of fit generally, whereas the preference of American English is more complex: AmE prefers fitted for the metaphorical sense of having made an object [adjective-]"fit" (i.e., suited) for a purpose; in spatial transitive contexts, AmE uses fitted for the sense of having made an object conform to an unchanged object that it surrounds (e.g., "fitted X around Y") but fit for the sense of having made an object conform to an unchanged object that surrounds it (e.g., "fit[-past] X into Y"); and for the spatial senses (both intransitive and transitive) of having been matching with respect to contour, with no alteration of either object implied, AmE prefers fit ("The clothes [past-]fit."; "The clothes [past-]fit me well.").
- The past tense of spit "expectorate" is spat in BrE, spit or spat in AmE. AmE typically has spat in figurative contexts, for example, "He spat out the name with a sneer", or in the context of expectoration of an object that is not saliva, for example, "He spat out the foul-tasting fish" but spit for "expectorated" when it refers only to the expulsion of phlegm or saliva.
- The past participle of saw is normally sawn in BrE and sawed in AmE (as in sawn-off/sawed-off shotgun).
- The past participle gotten is rarely used in modern BrE, which generally uses got except when fixed in old expressions such as ill-gotten gains and in the minority of dialects that retain the older form. The American dictionary Merriam-Webster, however, lists "gotten" as a standard past participle of "get." According to the Compact Oxford English Dictionary, "The form gotten is not used in British English but is very common in North American English"
- AmE, but not BrE, has forgot as a less common alternative to forgotten for the past participle of forget.
- AmE further allows other irregular verbs, such as dive (dove) or sneak (snuck), and often mixes the preterite and past participle forms (spring–sprang, US also spring–sprung), sometimes forcing verbs such as shrink (shrank–shrunk) to have a further form, thus shrunk–shrunken. These uses are often considered nonstandard; the AP Stylebook in AmE treats some irregular verbs as colloquialisms, insisting on the regular forms for the past tense of dive, plead and sneak. Dove and snuck are usually considered nonstandard in Britain, although dove exists in some British dialects and snuck is occasionally found in British speech.

=== Use of tenses ===
- With words such as already and yet, simple past is more commonly used in American English while present perfect is more common in British English.
- In BrE, have got or have can be used for possession and have got to and have to can be used for the modal of necessity. The forms that include got are usually used in informal contexts and the forms without got in contexts that are more formal. In American speech the form without got is used more than in the UK, although the form with got is often used for emphasis. Colloquial AmE informally uses got as a finite verb for these meanings—for example, I got two cars, I got to go.
- In conditional sentences if clauses, US spoken usage often substitutes in the subordinate clause would and would have (usually shortened to [I]'d and would've) for the simple past and for the past perfect (If you'd leave now, you'd be on time. / If I would have [would've] cooked the pie we could have [could've] had it for lunch as opposed to If you left now, you'd be on time. / If I had cooked the pie we could have had it for lunch). This tends to be avoided in writing because it is often still considered non-standard although such use of would is widespread in spoken US English in all sectors of society. Some reliable sources now label this usage as acceptable US English and no longer label it as colloquial. (There are situations where would is used in British English too in seemingly counterfactual conditions, but these can usually be interpreted as a modal use of would: If you would listen to me once in a while, you might learn something.) In cases in which the action in the if clause takes place after that in the main clause, use of would in counterfactual conditions is, however, considered standard and correct usage in even formal UK and US usage: If it would make Bill happy, I'd [I would] give him the money.
- The "present subjunctive" (morphologically identical with the bare infinitive) is regularly used in AmE in mandative clauses (as in They suggested that he apply for the job). In BrE, this usage declined in the 20th century in favor of constructions such as They suggested that he should apply for the job (or even, more ambiguously, They suggested that he applied for the job). However, the mandative subjunctive has always been used in BrE, especially in formal writing.

=== Verbal auxiliaries ===
- Shall is much more commonly used by the British than by modern-day Americans, who generally prefer will. Some prescriptions about the distinction exist, which are now esoteric in AmE. However shall is still common in American legal documents. Shan't is typically regarded by Americans as a stereotypical British construction; in AmE, it is almost invariably replaced by won't or am/are/is not going to or their contractions. In both British and American grammar, would and should have different meanings. However, in British grammar, it is also possible for should and would to have the same meaning, with a distinction only in terms of formality (should simply being more formal than would). For most Americans, this nuance has been lost, with would being used in both contexts; for example, I should like to leave is no longer a formal way to say I would like to leave in modern AmE. Expressions like I should be happy to go are rather formal even in BrE.
- The periphrastic future "be going to" is about twice as frequent in AmE as in BrE.
- Use of "do" as a pro-predicate is almost exclusively British usage.

- Example: "Did Frank love it?" — "He must have done."
The AmE response would be "He must have." omitting the form of "do". The BrE usage is commonly found with all forms of "do", for example:

I have done.
I haven't done.
I will do.
I might have done.
I could do.
I could have done.
I should do.
I should have done.

Except in the negative, the initial pronoun may be omitted in informal speech.

=== Transitivity ===
The following verbs show differences in transitivity between BrE and AmE:

- agree: Transitive or intransitive in BrE, usually intransitive (except with objective clauses) in AmE (agree a contract/agree to or on a contract, but I agree that this is a good contract in both). However, in formal AmE and BrE legal writing one often sees constructions such as as may be agreed between the parties (rather than as may be agreed upon between the parties).
- appeal (as a decision): Usually intransitive in BrE (used with against) and transitive in AmE (appeal against the decision to the Court/appeal the decision to the Court).
- catch up ("to reach and overtake"): Transitive or intransitive in BrE, strictly intransitive in AmE (to catch somebody up/to catch up with somebody). A transitive form exists in AmE, with a different meaning: to catch somebody up means that the subject will help the object catch up, rather the opposite of the BrE transitive meaning.
- cater ("to provide food and service"): Intransitive in BrE, transitive or intransitive in AmE (to cater for a banquet/to cater a banquet).
- cater to ("to allow for a possibility"): to cater to the speaker not turning up. A British speaker would probably recast the sentence.
- claim: Sometimes intransitive in BrE (used with for), strictly transitive in AmE.
- meet: AmE uses intransitively meet followed by with to mean "to have a meeting with", as for business purposes (Yesterday we met with the CEO), and reserves transitive meet for the meanings "to be introduced to" (I want you to meet the CEO; she is such a fine lady), "to come together with (someone, somewhere)" (Meet the CEO at the train station), and "to have a casual encounter with". BrE uses transitive meet also to mean "to have a meeting with"; the construction meet with, which actually dates back to Middle English, appears to be coming back into use in Britain, despite some commentators who preferred to avoid confusion with meet with meaning "receive, undergo" (the proposal was met with disapproval). The construction meet up with (as in to meet up with someone), which originated in the US, has long been standard in both dialects.
- provide: Strictly monotransitive in BrE, monotransitive or ditransitive in AmE (provide somebody with something/provide somebody something).
- protest: In sense "oppose", intransitive in BrE, transitive in AmE (The workers protested against the decision/The workers protested the decision). The intransitive protest against in AmE means "to hold or participate in a demonstration against". The older sense "proclaim" is always transitive (protest one's innocence).
- visit: In BrE, the verb is transitive; AmE uses both visit and visit with where the object is a person or persons.
- write: In BrE, the indirect object of this verb usually requires the preposition to, for example, I'll write to my MP or I'll write to her (although it is not required in some situations, for example when an indirect object pronoun comes before a direct object noun, for example, I'll write her a letter). In AmE, write can be used monotransitively (I'll write my congressman; I'll write him).

=== Complementation ===
- The verbs prevent and stop can be found in two different constructions: "prevent/stop someone from doing something" and "prevent/stop someone doing something". The latter is well established in BrE, but not in AmE.
- Some verbs can take either a to+infinitive construction or a gerund construction (for example, to start to do something/to start doing something). For example, the gerund is more common:
  - In AmE than BrE, with start, begin, omit, enjoy;
  - In BrE than AmE, with love, like, intend.

== Presence (or absence) of syntactic elements ==
- Tags which include the full subject used at the end of the sentence (e.g. Likes her cappuccino, Mary does.) are more common in British English than in American English.
- Where a statement of intention involves two separate activities, speakers of BrE often use "to go and" plus bare infinitive while it is also acceptable for speakers of AmE to use "to go" plus bare infinitive. Thus, where BrE speakers would say "I'll go and take/have a bath", AmE speakers may also say "I'll go take/have a bath". (Both can also use the form "to go to" instead to suggest that the action might fail, as in "He went to take/have a bath, but the bathtub was full of children".) Similarly, "to come" plus bare infinitive is acceptable to speakers of AmE, but speakers of BrE would instead use "to come and" plus bare infinitive. Thus, where a speaker of AmE may say "come see what I bought", BrE and some AmE speakers would say "come and see what I've bought" (notice the present perfect: a common British preference).
- Use of prepositions before days denoted by a single word. The British say She resigned on Thursday, but Americans often say She resigned Thursday although both forms are common in American usage. Occasionally, the preposition is also absent when referring to months: I'll be here December (although this usage is generally limited to colloquial speech).
- In the UK, from is used with single dates and times more often than in the United States. British speakers and writers may say the new museum will be open from Tuesday, but Americans most likely say the new museum will be open starting or on Tuesday. (This difference does not apply to phrases of the pattern from A to B, which are used in both BrE and AmE.) A variation or alternative of that is the mostly-American the play opens Tuesday and the mostly-British the play opens on Tuesday.
- American legislators and lawyers always use the preposition of between the name of a legislative act and the year it was passed, but their British counterparts do not. Compare Americans with Disabilities Act of 1990 to the Disability Discrimination Act 1995.

=== Definite article ===
- A few 'institutional' nouns take no definite article when a certain role is implied: for example, "at sea" (as a sailor), "in prison" (as a convict), and "at/in college" (for students). Among this group, BrE has "in hospital" (as a patient) and "at university" (as a student), where AmE requires "in the hospital" and "at the university" (though, in AmE, "in college" and "in school" are much more common to mean the same thing). When the implied roles of patient or student do not apply, the definite article is used in both dialects. However, both variations drop the definite article with rush hour: at rush hour (BrE)/in rush-hour traffic (AmE).
- When talking about playing musical instruments, without necessarily using the word 'play', the definite article is used in BrE, whereas in AmE it can be omitted:
  - How difficult is it to learn (the) violin?
  - I'm practicing (the) piano.
  - play (the) piano
  - Plectrum was an instrument for striking (the) lyre.
- Some fixed phrases are used with the word a or no article in American English:
  - bring to a boil
  - tell time
  - in light of
- British English prefers the word the or a:
  - bring to the/a boil
  - tell the time
  - in the light of
- However, BrE distinguishes "in future" ("from now on") from "in the future" ("at some future time"); AmE uses "in the future" for both senses.
- In BrE, numbered highways usually take the definite article (for example, "the M25", "the A14"); AmE usually omits in ("I-495", "Route 66"). Southern California, Arizona, and certain areas in which Inland Northern American English is spoken are exceptions, where "the 33", "the 5", or "the 10" are the standard (see, for example, State highways in California § Nomenclature in California English). A similar pattern is followed for named roads (Strand in London is almost always referred to as the Strand), but in America, there are local variations, and older American highways tend to follow the British pattern ("the Boston Post Road").
- AmE distinguishes "in back of" [behind] from "in the back of"; BrE does not use the former, which can be misinterpreted as the latter. (Both, however, distinguish "in front of" from "in the front of".)
- Dates often include a definite article in spoken BrE, such as "the eleventh of July", or "July the eleventh"; AmE most commonly say "July eleventh" but occasionally "July eleven". However, the UK variants are also found in the US, even in formal contexts, especially in rural New England and the Deep South, perhaps influenced by other English variants, one example being "the Fourth of July", Independence Day in the US.

=== Phrasal verbs ===
- In AmE, paperwork is usually but not invariably filled out, but in BrE, it is usually filled in. However, in reference to individual parts of a form Americans may also use in (fill in the blanks). In AmE, the direction fill it all in (referring to the form as a collection of blanks, perhaps) is as common as fill it all out.
- Britons facing extortionate prices may have no option but to fork out, but Americans are more likely to fork (it) over or sometimes up; however, the out usage is found in both dialects.
- In both countries, thugs beat up their victim, but AmE also allows beat on (as both varieties allow for an inanimate object, such as a drum) or beat up on, which are often considered slang.
- When an outdoor event is postponed or interrupted by rain, it is rained off in the UK and rained out in the US.

== Miscellaneous grammatical differences ==
- In American English (but not in British English) the word likely meaning probably is used as an adverb (e.g. Likely he'll win the election in this economy.).
- In BrE, the word sat is often colloquially used to cover sat, sitting and seated: I've been sat here waiting for half an hour. The bride's family will be sat on the right-hand side of the church. That construction is not often heard outside the UK. In the 1960s, its use would mark a speaker as coming from Northern England, but by the turn of the 21st century, it had spread to Southern England. Its use often conveys lighthearted informality in which many speakers intentionally use a dialect or colloquial construction they would probably not use in formal written English. The colloquial usage is widely understood by British speakers. Similarly, stood may be used instead of standing. To Americans and still to many Britons, those usages are passive and may imply that the subject had been involuntarily forced to sit or to stand or directed to hold that location.
- Nearly 40% of participants in a national survey of the United States claimed that they may use the phrase Are you coming with? to mean Are you coming with us? or Are you coming along?, but it is rarely used in writing and linguists particularly associate the phrase with the upper Midwestern United States. Come with is used as an abbreviation of come with me, as in I'm going to the office – come with by speakers in Minnesota and parts of the adjoining states, which had a large number of Scandinavian, Dutch, and German immigrants; speaking English, they translated equivalent phrases directly from their own languages. German and Dutch have separable verbs meaning to "come with", mitkommen, and meekomen. It is similar to South African English in which expression comes from Afrikaans, a language of Dutch origin. Those contractions are rarely used in BrE.
- Before some words beginning with a pronounced (not silent) h in an unstressed first syllable, such as hallucination, hilarious, historic(al), horrendous and horrific, some (especially older) British writers prefer to use an over a (an historical event, etc.). An is also preferred before hotel by some writers of BrE, probably reflecting the relatively recent adoption of the word from French in which the h is not pronounced, but it also fits the stress rule described since it is the second syllable that is stressed. The use of "an" before words beginning with an unstressed "h" is less common generally in AmE. Such usage would now be seen as affected or incorrect in AmE, which normally uses a in all these cases. According to The New Oxford Dictionary of English, such use is also increasingly rare the UK. Unlike BrE, however, AmE typically uses an before herb, since the h in this word is silent for most Americans.
- The adverb well may be used in colloquial BrE only with the meaning "very" to modify adjectives. For example, "The film was well good."
- In both British and American English, a person can make a decision; however, only in British English is the common variant take a decision also an option in a formal, serious, or official context.
- The British often describe a person as tanned, where Americans would use tan. For instance, "she was tanned", rather than "she was tan".

== See also ==
- Comparison of American and British English
