= Mutual attraction =

Mutual Attraction may refer to:

== Phenomena ==
- Interpersonal attraction
- Electromagnetic attraction
- Gravity

== Media ==
- Mutual Attraction (album), 1986 studio album by Sylvester
- "Mutual Attraction" (song), song by Change from the 1985 album Turn On Your Radio
- "Mutual Attraction" (volume), the 24th volume of the manga series How I Met My Soulmate

== See also ==
- Attraction (disambiguation)
