= Comparison of American and British English =

The English language was introduced to the Americas by the arrival of the English, beginning in the late 16th century. The language also spread to numerous other parts of the world as a result of British trade and settlement and the spread of the former British Empire, which, by 1921, included 470–570 million people, about a quarter of the world's population. In England, Wales, Ireland and especially parts of Scotland there are differing varieties of the English language. Likewise, spoken American English varies widely across the country. Written forms of British and American English as found in newspapers and textbooks vary little in their essential features, with only occasional noticeable differences.

Over the past 400 years, the forms of the language used in the Americas—especially in the United States—and that used in the United Kingdom have diverged in a few minor ways, leading to the versions now often referred to as American English and British English. Differences between the two include pronunciation, grammar, vocabulary (lexis), spelling, punctuation, idioms, and formatting of dates and numbers. However, the differences in written and most spoken grammar structure tend to be much fewer than in other aspects of the language in terms of mutual intelligibility. A few words have completely different meanings in the two versions or are even unknown or not used in one of the versions. One particular contribution towards integrating these differences came from Noah Webster, who wrote the first American dictionary (published 1828) with the intention of unifying the disparate dialects across the United States and codifying North American vocabulary which was not present in British dictionaries.

This divergence between American English and British English has provided opportunities for humorous comment: e.g. in fiction George Bernard Shaw says that the United States and United Kingdom are "two countries divided by a common language"; and Oscar Wilde says that "We have really everything in common with America nowadays, except, of course, the language" (The Canterville Ghost, 1888). Henry Sweet incorrectly predicted in 1877 that within a century American English, Australian English and British English would be mutually unintelligible (A Handbook of Phonetics). Perhaps increased worldwide communication through telecommunications has tended to reduce regional variation. This can lead to some variations becoming extinct (for instance the wireless being progressively superseded by the radio) or the acceptance of wide variations as "perfectly good English" everywhere.

Although spoken American and British English are generally mutually intelligible, there are occasional differences which may cause embarrassment—for example, in American English a rubber is usually interpreted as a condom rather than an eraser.

== Word derivation and compounds ==
- Directional suffix -ward(s): British forwards, towards, rightwards, etc.; American forward, toward, rightward. In both varieties distribution varies somewhat: afterwards, towards, and backwards are not unusual in the United States; while in the United Kingdom upward and rightward are the more common options, as is forward, which is standard in phrasal verbs such as look forward to. The forms with -s may be used as adverbs (or preposition towards) but rarely as adjectives: in the UK, as in the United States, one says "an upward motion". The Oxford English Dictionary in 1897 suggested a semantic distinction for adverbs, with -wards having a more definite directional sense than -ward; subsequent authorities such as Fowler have disputed this contention.
- American English freely adds the suffix -s to day, night, evening, weekend, Monday, etc. to form adverbs denoting repeated or customary action: I used to stay out evenings; the library is closed on Saturdays. This usage has its roots in Old English but many of these constructions are now regarded as American (for example, the OED labels nights "now chiefly N. Amer. colloq." in constructions such as to sleep nights, but to work nights is standard in British English).
- In British English, the agentive -er suffix is commonly attached to football to refer to one who plays the sport (also cricket; often netball; occasionally basketball and volleyball). American English usually uses football player. Where the sport's name is usable as a verb, the suffixation is standard in both varieties: for example, golfer, bowler (in ten-pin bowling and in lawn bowls), and shooter. American English appears sometimes to use the form baller as slang for a basketball player, as in the video game NBA Ballers. However, this is derived from slang use of to ball as a verb meaning to play basketball.
- English writers everywhere occasionally make new compound words from common phrases; for example, health care is now being replaced by healthcare on both sides of the Atlantic. However, American English has made certain words (e.g. anymore) in this fashion that are treated as phrases in British English (e.g. any more).
- In compound nouns of the form <verb><noun>, sometimes American English prefers the bare infinitive where British English prefers the gerund. Examples include (American English first): jump rope/skipping rope; racecar/racing car; rowboat/rowing boat; sailboat/sailing boat; file cabinet/filing cabinet; dial tone/dialling tone; drainboard/draining board.
- Generally American English has a tendency to drop inflectional suffixes, thus preferring clipped forms: compare cookbook v. cookery book; Smith, age 40 v. Smith, aged 40; skim milk v. skimmed milk; dollhouse v. dolls' house; barber shop v. barber's shop.
- Some British English words come from French roots, while American English finds its words from other places, e.g. American English eggplant and zucchini are aubergine and courgette in British English, respectively.
- Similarly, American English has occasionally replaced more traditional English words with their Spanish counterparts. This is especially common in regions historically affected by Spanish settlement (such as the American Southwest and Florida) as well as other areas that have since experienced strong Hispanic migration (such as urban areas). Examples of these include grocery markets' preference in the U.S. for Spanish names such as cilantro and manzanilla over coriander and camomile respectively.

== Pronunciation ==
Several pronunciation patterns contrast American and British English accents. The following lists a few common ones.

- Most American accents are rhotic, preserving the historical /r/ phoneme in all contexts, while most British accents of England and Wales are non-rhotic, only preserving this sound before vowels but dropping it in all other contexts; thus, stalk and stork are homophones in British English but not in American English.
- American accents tend to raise the tongue whenever the phoneme /æ/ (in words like TRAP, DANCE, BATH) occurs before the nasal consonants /m/ and /n/.
- British accents distinguish the vowel sounds in LOT, THOUGHT, and PALM, while American accents merge the LOT and PALM vowels together, and about 50% of Americans additionally merge the THOUGHT vowel with the previous two, so for example odd, façade, and thawed can all rhyme.
- Many regional and informal accents of England, but few in North America, exhibit H-dropping.
- Words like bitter and bidder are pronounced the same in North America, but not England, due to a phenomenon called flapping involving /t/ and /d/ between vowels. British accents pronounce /t/ between vowels in other ways than Americans, including with a glottal stop or with an aspirated /t/.

== Vocabulary ==
The familiarity of speakers with words and phrases from different regions varies, and the difficulty of discerning an unfamiliar definition also depends on the context and the term. As expressions spread with telecommunications, they are often but not always understood as foreign to the speaker's dialect, and words from other dialects may carry connotations with regard to register, social status, origin, and intelligence.

=== Words and phrases with different meanings ===
Words such as bill and biscuit are used regularly in both American English and British English but can mean different things in each form. The word "bill" has several meanings, most of which are shared between American English and British English. However, in American English "bill" often refers to a piece of paper money (as in a "dollar bill") which in British English is more commonly referred to as a note. In American English it can also refer to the visor of a cap, though this is by no means common. In American English a biscuit (from the French "twice baked" as in biscotto) is a soft bready product that is known in British English as a scone or a specifically hard, sweet biscuit. Meanwhile, a British English biscuit incorporates both dessert biscuits and American English cookies (from the Dutch 'little cake').

As chronicled by Winston Churchill, the opposite meanings of the verb to table created a misunderstanding during a meeting of the Allied forces; in British English to table an item on an agenda means to open it up for discussion whereas in American English, it means to remove it from discussion, or at times, to suspend or delay discussion; e.g. Let's table that topic for later. Similarly, the word moot (and moot point) in British English means 'remains open to debate' whereas in American English, it means 'of no practical significance', irrelevant.

The word "football" in British English refers to association football, also known in the US as soccer. In American English, "football" means American football. The standard American English term "soccer", a contraction of "association (football)", is actually of British origin, derived from the ratification of different codes of football in the 19th century, and was a fairly unremarkable usage (possibly marked for class) in British English until later; in Britain it became perceived as an Americanism. Outside North America, particularly in sports news, American (or US branches of foreign) news agencies and media companies also use "football" to mean "soccer", especially in direct quotes.

Similarly, the word "hockey" in British English often refers to field hockey and in American English, "hockey" usually means ice hockey.

Words with completely different meanings are relatively few; most of the time there are either (1) words with one or more shared meanings and one or more meanings unique to one variety (for example, bathroom and toilet) or (2) words the meanings of which are actually common to both British English and American English but that show differences in frequency, connotation or denotation (for example, smart, clever, mad).

Some differences in usage and meaning can cause confusion or embarrassment. For example, the word fanny is a slang word for vulva in British English but means buttocks in American English, hence the American English phrase fanny pack is bum bag in British English. In American English the word pissed means being annoyed or angry whereas in British English it is a coarse word for being drunk (in both varieties, pissed off means irritated).

Similarly, in American English the word pants is the common word for the British English trousers and (in American English) knickers refers to a variety of half-length trousers (though most American English users would use the term "shorts" rather than knickers), while the majority of British English speakers would understand pants to mean underpants and knickers to mean female underpants.

Sometimes the confusion is more subtle. In American English the word quite used as a qualifier is generally a reinforcement, though it is somewhat uncommon in actual colloquial American use today and carries an air of formality: for example, "I'm quite hungry" is a very polite way to say "I'm very hungry". In British English quite (which is much more common in conversation) may have this meaning, as in "quite right" or "quite mad", but it more commonly means "somewhat", so that in British English "I'm quite hungry" can mean "I'm somewhat hungry". This divergence of use can lead to misunderstanding.

=== Different terms in different dialects ===
Most speakers of American English are aware of some uniquely British terms. It is generally very easy to guess what some words, such as British English "driving licence", mean, the American English equivalent being "driver's license". However, use of many other British words such as naff (slang but commonly used to mean "not very good") are unheard of in American English.

Speakers of British English usually find it easy to understand most common American English terms, such as "sidewalk (pavement or footpath)", "gas (gasoline/petrol)", "counterclockwise (anticlockwise)" or "elevator (lift)", thanks in large part to considerable exposure to American popular culture and literature. Terms heard less often, especially when rare or absent in American popular culture, such as "copacetic (very satisfactory)", are unlikely to be understood by most British English speakers.

Other examples:

- In the UK the word whilst is commonly used as a conjunction (as an alternative to while, especially prevalent in some dialects). whilst tends to appear in non-temporal senses, as when used to point out a contrast. In American English while is used in both contexts, with whilst being much more uncommon. Other words with the -st ending are also found even in American English as much as in British English, despite being old-fashioned or an affectation (e.g., unbeknownst, midst). Historically, the word against falls into this category also, and is standard in both varieties.
- In the UK generally the use of fall to mean "autumn" is obsolete. Although found often from Elizabethan literature to Victorian literature, the seasonal use of fall remains easily understandable to British English speakers only because it is so commonly used that way in the U.S.
- In the UK the term period for a full stop is not used; in American English the term full stop is rarely, if ever, used for the punctuation mark and commonly not understood whatsoever. For example, British Prime Minister Tony Blair said, "Terrorism is wrong, full stop", whereas in American English, the equivalent sentence is "Terrorism is wrong, period." The use of period as an interjection meaning "and nothing else; end of discussion" is beginning to be used in colloquial British English, though sometimes without conscious reference to punctuation.
- In the US, the word line is used to refer to a line of people, vehicles, or other objects, while in the UK queue refers to that meaning. In the US, the word queue is most commonly used to refer to the computing sense of a data structure in which objects are added to one end and removed from the other. In the US, the equivalent terms to "queue up" and "wait in the queue" are "line up" or "get in line" and "wait in line." The equivalent term to "jumping the queue" is "cutting in line."

British	American
maths	math
post	mail
trapezium	trapezoid
aluminium	aluminum
football	soccer
quid (slang for one pound or multiple pounds)	buck (slang for a dollar)

=== Holiday greetings ===
It is increasingly common for Americans to say "Happy holidays", referring to all, or at least multiple, winter (in the Northern hemisphere) or summer (in the Southern hemisphere) holidays (Christmas, Hanukkah, Kwanzaa, etc.) especially when one's religious observances are not known; the phrase is rarely heard in the UK. In the UK, the phrases "holiday season" and "holiday period" refer to the period in the summer when most people take time off from work, and travel; American English does not use holiday in this sense, instead using vacation for recreational excursions.

In American English, the prevailing Christmas greeting is "Merry Christmas", which is the traditional English Christmas greeting, as found in the English Christmas carol "We Wish You a Merry Christmas", and which appears several times in Charles Dickens' A Christmas Carol. In British English, "Happy Christmas" is a common alternative to "Merry Christmas".

=== Idiosyncratic differences ===
==== Omission of "and" and "on" ====
Generally in British English, numbers with a value over one hundred have the word "and" inserted before the last two digits. For example, the number 151, when written in words or spoken aloud, would be "One hundred and fifty-one". In American English, numbers are typically said or written in words in the same way, however if the word "and" is omitted ("One hundred fifty-one"), this is also considered acceptable (in British English this would be considered grammatically incorrect).

Likewise, in the US, the word "on" can be left out when referring to events occurring on any particular day of the week. The US possibility "The Panthers won the game Sunday" would have the equivalent in the UK of "Manchester City won the match on Sunday."

==== Figures of speech ====
Both British English and American English use the expression "I couldn't care less", to mean that the speaker does not care at all. Some Americans use "I could care less" to mean the same thing. This variant is frequently derided as sloppy, as the literal meaning of the words is that the speaker does care to some extent.

In both areas, saying, "I don't mind" often means, "I'm not annoyed" (for example, by someone's smoking), while "I don't care" often means, "The matter is trivial or boring". However, in answering a question such as "Tea or coffee?", if either alternative is equally acceptable an American may answer, "I don't care", while a British person may answer, "I don't mind". Either can sound odd, confusing, or rude, to those accustomed to the other variant.

"To be all set" in both British English and American English can mean "to be prepared or ready", though it appears to be more common in American English. It can also have an additional meaning in American English of "to be finished or done", for example, a customer at a restaurant telling a waiter "I'm all set. I'll take the check."

==== Equivalent idioms ====
A number of English idioms that have essentially the same meaning show lexical differences between the British and the American version; for instance:

British English	American English
not touch something with a bargepole	not touch something with a ten-foot pole
sweep under the carpet	sweep under the rug*
touch wood	knock on wood
(can't) see the wood for the trees	(can't) see the forest for the trees
put a spanner in the works	throw a (monkey) wrench in(to) (a situation)
to put (or stick) your oar in but it won't make a ha'porth of difference to put your two penn'orth (or tuppence worth) in	to put your two cents (or two cents' worth) in
skeleton in the cupboard	skeleton in the closet
a home from home	a home away from home
to blow one's own trumpet	to blow (or toot) one's own horn
a drop in the ocean	a drop in the bucket
flogging a dead horse	beating a dead horse
haven't (got) a clue	don't have a clue or have no clue (the British forms are also acceptable)
couldn't care less	could care less or couldn't care less
a new lease of life	a new lease on life
lie of the land or lay of the land	lay of the land
take it with a pinch of salt	take it with a grain of salt
a storm in a teacup	a tempest in a teapot (rare)
out of order	out of line
slowcoach	slowpoke

* In the US, a "carpet" typically refers to a fitted carpet, rather than a rug.

=== Social and cultural differences ===
Lexical items that reflect separate social and cultural development.

==== Education ====
===== Primary and secondary school =====
The naming of school years in British (except Scotland) and American English
Age range	British English			American English	
Age range	Name	Alternative/old name	Syllabus	Name	Alternative name
1–4	Preschool (optional)				
1–4	Nursery	Playgroup	Foundation Stage 1	Daycare	
3–5	Primary school				
3–5	Reception	Infants reception	Foundation Stage 2	Preschool	Pre-K
5–6	Year 1	Infants year 1	Key Stage 1	Kindergarten	
5–6	Year 1	Infants year 1	Key Stage 1	Elementary school	
6–7	Year 2	Infants year 2	Key Stage 1	1st grade	
7–8	Year 3	First year Junior	Key Stage 2	2nd grade	
8–9	Year 4	Second year junior	Key Stage 2	3rd grade	
9–10	Year 5	Third year junior	Key Stage 2	4th grade	
10–11	Year 6	Fourth year junior	Key Stage 2	5th grade	
11–12	Secondary school / High school			Middle school	Junior high school
11–12	Year 7	First form	Key Stage 3	6th grade	
12–13	Year 8	Second form	Key Stage 3	7th grade	
13–14	Year 9	Third form	Key Stage 3	8th grade	
14–15	Year 10	Fourth form	Key Stage 4, GCSE	High school	
14–15	Year 10	Fourth form	Key Stage 4, GCSE	9th grade	Freshman year
15–16	Year 11	Fifth form	Key Stage 4, GCSE	10th grade	Sophomore year
16–17	Sixth form / FE College			11th grade	Junior year
16–17	Year 12	Lower sixth (first year)	Key Stage 5, A level	11th grade	Junior year
17–18	Year 13	Upper sixth (second year)	Key Stage 5, A level	12th grade	Senior year

The US has a more uniform nationwide system of terms than does the UK, where terminology and structure varies among constituent countries, but the division by grades varies somewhat among the states and even among local school districts. For example, elementary school often includes kindergarten and may include sixth grade, with middle school including only two grades or extending to ninth grade.

In the UK, the US equivalent of a high school is often referred to as a "secondary school" regardless of whether it is state funded or private, however it begins at around 11. US Secondary education also includes middle school or junior high school, a two- or three-year transitional school between elementary school and high school. Middle school in the UK may refer to a school from the age of around 9 to around 14, however these schools are not standard.

A public school has opposite meanings in the two countries. In American English this is a government-owned institution open to all students, supported by public funding. In contemporary England and Wales the term strictly refers to an expensive group of prestigious private schools, funded with fees paid by parents, rather than the government. Private school (or independent school) is used as an umbrella term for all fee-paying schools inclusive of public schools. Government-funded schools in Scotland and Northern Ireland are both known as "state schools" (as in England and Wales) and "public schools" (with the same meaning as in the US), and in the US, where most public schools are administered by local governments, a state school typically refers to school run by one of the U.S. states.

A US prep school or preparatory school is an independent school funded by tuition fees; the same term is used in the UK for a private school for pupils under 13, designed to prepare them for fee-paying public schools.

===== University =====
In the UK a university student is said to "study", to "read" or, informally, simply to "do" a subject. In the recent past the expression 'to read a subject' was more common at the older universities such as Oxford and Cambridge. In the US a student studies or majors in a subject (although a student's major, concentration or, less commonly, emphasis is also used in US colleges or universities to refer to the major subject of study). To major in something refers to the student's principal course of study; to study may refer to any class being taken.

British English:

"She read biology at Cambridge."
"She studied biology at Cambridge."
"She did biology at Cambridge." (informal)

American English:

"She majored in biology at Harvard."
"She studied biology at Harvard."
"She concentrated in biology at Harvard."

At university level in British English, each module is taught or facilitated by a lecturer or tutor; professor is the job-title of a senior academic (in American English, at some universities, the equivalent of the British English lecturer is instructor, especially when the teacher has a lesser degree or no university degree, though the usage may become confusing according to whether the subject being taught is considered technical or not; it is also different from adjunct instructor/professor). In American English each class is generally taught by a professor (although some US tertiary educational institutions follow the British English usage), while the position of lecturer is occasionally given to individuals hired on a temporary basis to teach one or more classes and who may or may not have a doctoral degree.

The word course in American use typically refers to the study of a restricted topic or individual subject (for example, "a course in Early Medieval England", "a course in integral calculus") over a limited period of time (such as a semester or term) and is equivalent to a module or sometimes unit at a British university. In the UK, a course of study or simply course is likely to refer to the entire curriculum, which may extend over several years and be made up of any number of modules, hence it is also practically synonymous to a degree programme. A few university-specific exceptions exist: for example, at Cambridge the word paper is used to refer to a module, while the whole course of study is called tripos.

A dissertation in American English refers to the final written product of a doctoral student to meet the requirement of that curriculum. In British English, the same word refers to the final written product of a student in an undergraduate or taught master's programme. A dissertation in the American English sense would be a thesis in British English, though dissertation is also used.

Another source of confusion is the different usage of the word college. (See a full international discussion of the various meanings at college.) In the US, it refers to a post-high school institution that grants either associate's or bachelor's degrees, and in the UK, it refers to any post-secondary institution that is not a university (including sixth form college after the name in secondary education for years 12 and 13, the sixth form) where intermediary courses such as A levels or NVQs can be taken and GCSE courses can be retaken. College may sometimes be used in the UK or in Commonwealth countries as part of the name of a secondary or high school (for example, Dubai College). In the case of the universities of Oxford, Cambridge, Aberdeen, London, Lancaster, Durham, Kent and York, all members are also members of a college which is part of the university, for example, one is a member of King's College, Cambridge and hence of the university.

In both the US and UK college can refer to some division within a university that comprises related academic departments such as the "college of business and economics" though in the UK "faculty" is more often used. Institutions in the US that offer two to four years of post-high school education often have the word college as part of their name, while those offering more advanced degrees are called a university. (There are exceptions: Boston College, Dartmouth College and the College of William & Mary are examples of colleges that offer advanced degrees, while Vincennes University is an unusual example of a "university" that offers only associate degrees in the vast majority of its academic programmes). American students who pursue a bachelor's degree (four years of higher education) or an associate degree (two years of higher education) are college students regardless of whether they attend a college or a university and refer to their educational institutions informally as colleges. A student who pursues a master's degree or a doctorate degree in the arts and sciences is in American English a graduate student; in British English a postgraduate student although graduate student is also sometimes used. Students of advanced professional programmes are known by their field (business student, law student, medical student). Some universities also have a residential college system, the details of which may vary but generally involve common living and dining spaces as well as college-planned activities. Nonetheless, when it comes to the level of education, American English generally uses the word college (e.g., going to college) whereas British English generally uses the word university (e.g., going to university) regardless of the institution's official designation/status in both countries.

In the context of higher education, the word school is used slightly differently in British English and American English. In British English, except for the University of London, the word school is used to refer to an academic department in a university. In American English, the word school is used to refer to a collection of related academic departments and is headed by a dean. When it refers to a division of a university, school is practically synonymous to a college.

"Professor" has different meanings in British English and American English. In British English it is the highest academic rank, followed by reader, senior lecturer and lecturer. In American English "professor" refers to academic staff of all ranks, with (full) professor (largely equivalent to the UK meaning) followed by associate professor and assistant professor.

"Tuition" has traditionally had separate meaning in each variation. In British English it is the educational content transferred from teacher to student at a university. In American English it is the money (the fees) paid to receive that education (British English: tuition fees).

===== General terms =====
In both the US and the UK, a student takes an exam, but in British English a student can also be said to sit an exam. When preparing for an exam students revise (British English)/review (American English) what they have studied; the British English idiom to revise for has the equivalent to review for in American English.

Examinations are supervised by invigilators in the UK and proctors (or (exam) supervisors) in the US (a proctor in the UK is an official responsible for student discipline at the University of Oxford or Cambridge). In the UK a teacher first sets and then administers an exam, while in the US, a teacher first writes, makes, prepares, etc. and then gives an exam. With the same basic meaning of the latter idea but with a more formal or official connotation, a teacher in the US may also administer or proctor an exam.

British English:

"I sat my Spanish exam yesterday."
"I plan to set a difficult exam for my students, but it isn't ready yet."

American English:

"I took my exams at Yale."
"I spent the entire day yesterday writing the exam. I'm almost ready to give it to my students."

In British English, students are awarded marks as credit for requirements (e.g., tests, projects) while in American English, students are awarded points or "grades" for the same. Similarly, in British English, a candidate's work is being marked, while in American English it is said to be graded to determine what mark or grade is given.

There is additionally a difference between American and British usage in the word school. In British usage "school" by itself refers only to primary (elementary) and secondary (high) schools and to sixth forms attached to secondary schools—if one "goes to school", this type of institution is implied. By contrast an American student at a university may be "in/at school", "coming/going to school", etc. US and British law students and medical students both commonly speak in terms of going to "law school" and "med[ical] school", respectively. However, the word school is used in British English in the context of higher education to describe a division grouping together several related subjects within a university, for example a "School of European Languages" containing departments for each language and also in the term "art school". It is also the name of some of the constituent colleges of the University of London, for example, School of Oriental and African Studies, London School of Economics.

Among high-school and college students in the United States, the words freshman (or the gender-neutral terms first year or sometimes freshie), sophomore, junior and senior refer to the first, second, third and fourth years respectively. It is important that the context of either high school or college first be established or else it must be stated directly (that is, She is a high-school freshman. He is a college junior.). Many institutes in both countries also use the term first-year as a gender-neutral replacement for freshman, although in the US this is recent usage, formerly referring only to those in the first year as a graduate student. One exception is the University of Virginia; since its founding in 1819 the terms "first-year", "second-year", "third-year", and "fourth-year" have been used to describe undergraduate university students. At the United States service academies, at least those operated by the federal government directly, a different terminology is used, namely "fourth class", "third class", "second class" and "first class" (the order of numbering being the reverse of the number of years in attendance). In the UK first-year university students are sometimes called freshers early in the academic year; however, there are no specific names for those in other years nor for school pupils; “freshers’ week” or simply “freshers” is colloquially, but increasingly commonly, used to refer to the first few weeks of the academic year, typically when students get to know the university's campus, join extra-curricular clubs and associations, and even going out for the night for drinking and to go to night clubs. Graduate and professional students in the United States are known by their year of study, such as a "second-year medical student" or a "fifth-year doctoral candidate." Law students are often referred to as "1L", "2L" or "3L" rather than “nth-year law students"; similarly, medical students are frequently referred to as "M1", "M2", "M3" or "M4".

While anyone in the US who finishes studying at any educational institution by passing relevant examinations is said to graduate and to be a graduate, in the UK only degree and above level students can graduate. Student itself has a wider meaning in American English, meaning any person of any age studying any subject at any level (including those not doing so at an educational institution, such as a "piano student" taking private lessons in a home), whereas in British English it tends to be used for people studying at a post-secondary educational institution and the term pupil is more widely used for a young person at primary or secondary school, though the use of "student" for secondary school pupils in the UK is increasingly used, particularly for "sixth form" (years 12 and 13).

The names of individual institutions can be confusing. There are several high schools with the word "university" in their names in the United States that are not affiliated with any post-secondary institutions and cannot grant degrees, and there is one public high school, Central High School of Philadelphia, that does grant bachelor's degrees to the top 10% of graduating seniors. British secondary schools occasionally have the word "college" in their names.

When it comes to the admissions process, applicants are usually asked to solicit letters of reference or reference forms from referees in British English. In American English, these are called letters of recommendation or recommendation forms. Consequently, the writers of these letters are known as referees and recommenders, respectively by country. In American English, the word referee is nearly always understood to refer to an umpire of a sporting match.

In the context of education, for American English, the word staff mainly refers to school personnel who are neither administrators nor have teaching loads or academic responsibilities; personnel who have academic responsibilities are referred to as members of their institution's faculty. In British English, the word staff refers to both academic and non-academic school personnel. As mentioned previously, the term faculty in British English refers more to a collection of related academic departments.

==== Government and politics ====
In the UK, political candidates stand for election, while in the US, they run for office. There is virtually no crossover between British English and American English in the use of these terms. Additionally, the document which contains a party's positions/principles is referred to as a party platform in American English, whereas it is commonly known as a party manifesto in British English. (In American English, using the term manifesto may connote that the party is an extremist or radical association). The term general election is used slightly differently in British and American English. In British English, it refers exclusively to a nationwide parliamentary election and is differentiated from local elections (mayoral and council) and by-elections; whereas in American English, it refers to a final election for any government position in the US, where the term is differentiated from the term primary (an election that determines a party's candidate for the position in question). Additionally, a by-election in British English is called a special election in American English.

In American English, the term swing state, swing county, swing district is used to denote a jurisdiction/constituency where results are expected to be close but crucial to the overall outcome of the general election. In British English, the term marginal constituency is more often used for the same and swing is more commonly used to refer to how much one party has gained (or lost) an advantage over another compared to the previous election. The word majority in British English often is used to refer to the difference in votes or percentages of votes between candidates or parties, whereas in American English it often more specifically refers to the concept of which candidate or party won the majority of seats.

In the UK, the term government only refers to what is commonly known in America as the executive branch or the particular administration.

A local government in the UK is generically referred to as the "council," whereas in the United States, a local government will be generically referred to as the "city" (or county, village, etc., depending on what kind of entity the government serves).

==== Business and finance ====
In financial statements, what is referred to in American English as revenue or sales is known in British English as turnover. In American English, having "high turnover" in a business context would generally carry negative implications, though the precise meaning would differ by industry.

A bankrupt firm goes into administration or liquidation in British English; in American English it goes bankrupt, or files for Chapter 7 (liquidation) or Chapter 11 (reorganisation), both of which refer to the legal authority under which bankruptcy is commenced. An insolvent individual or partnership goes bankrupt in both British English and American English.

If a finance company takes possession of a mortgaged property from a debtor, it is called foreclosure in American English and repossession in British English. In some limited scenarios, repossession may be used in American English, but it is much less common compared to foreclosure. One common exception in American English is for automobiles, which are always said to be repossessed. Indeed, an agent who collects these cars for the bank is colloquially known in American English as a repo man.

==== Employment and recruitment ====
In British English, the term CV — as an abbreviation of curriculum vitae, that is used infrequently — is used to describe the document prepared by applicants containing their credentials required for a job. In American English, the term résumé is more commonly used, with CV primarily used in academic or research contexts, and is usually more comprehensive than a résumé. As American English has a severe aversion to the use of accented letters, résumé is often written just as "resume", which in British English is often misinterpreted as to "carry on from where left off" thus causing much confusion.

==== Insurance ====
American English distinguishes between coverage as a noun and cover as a verb; an American seeks to buy enough insurance coverage in order to adequately cover a particular risk. British English uses the word "cover" for both the noun and verb forms.

==== Transport ====
American English speakers refer to transportation and British English speakers to transport. (Transportation in the UK has traditionally meant the punishment of criminals by deporting them to an overseas penal colony.) In American English, the word transport is usually used only as a verb, seldom as a noun or adjective except in reference to certain special objects, such as a tape transport or a military transport (e.g., a troop transport, a kind of vehicle, not an act of transporting).

===== Road transport =====
Differences in terminology are especially obvious in the context of roads. The British term dual carriageway, in American parlance, would be divided highway or perhaps, simply highway. The central reservation on a motorway or dual carriageway in the UK would be the median or center divide on a freeway, expressway, highway or parkway in the US. The one-way lanes that make it possible to enter and leave such roads at an intermediate point without disrupting the flow of traffic are known as slip roads in the UK but in the US, they are typically known as ramps and both further distinguish between on-ramps or on-slips (for entering onto a highway/carriageway) and off-ramps or exit-slips (for leaving a highway/carriageway). When American engineers speak of slip roads, they are referring to a street that runs alongside the main road (separated by a berm) to allow off-the-highway access to the premises that are there; however, the term frontage road is more commonly used, as this term is the equivalent of service road in the UK. However, it is not uncommon for an American to use service road as well instead of frontage road.

In the UK, the term outside lane refers to the higher-speed overtaking lane (passing lane in the US) closest to the middle of the road, while inside lane refers to the lane closer to the edge of the road. In the US, outside lane is used only in the context of a turn, in which case it depends in which direction the road is turning (i.e., if the road bends right, the left lane is the "outside lane", but if the road bends left, it is the right lane). Both also refer to slow and fast lanes (even though all actual traffic speeds may be at or around the legal speed limit).

In the UK drink driving refers to driving after having consumed alcoholic beverages, while in the US, the term is drunk driving. The legal term in the US is driving while intoxicated (DWI) or, more commonly, driving under the influence (of alcohol) (DUI). The equivalent legal phrase in the UK is drunk in charge of a motor vehicle (DIC) or more commonly driving with excess alcohol.

In the UK, a hire car is the US equivalent of a rental car. The term "hire car" can be especially misleading for those in the US, where the term "hire" is generally only applied to the employment of people and the term "rent" is applied to the temporary custody of goods. To an American, "hire car" would imply that the car has been brought into the employment of a company as if it were a person, which would sound nonsensical.

In the UK, a saloon is a vehicle that is equivalent to the American sedan. This is particularly confusing to Americans, because in the US the term saloon is used in only one context: describing an old bar (UK pub) in the American West (a Western saloon). Coupé is used by both to refer to a two-door car, but is usually pronounced with two syllables in the UK (coo-pay) and one syllable in the US (coop).

In the UK, van may refer to a small lorry (UK), whereas in the US, van is only understood to be a very small, boxy truck (US) (such as a moving van) or a long passenger automobile with several rows of seats (such as a minivan). A large, long vehicle used for cargo transport would nearly always be called a truck in the US, though alternate terms such as eighteen-wheeler may be occasionally heard (regardless of the actual number of tires (UK tyres) on the truck). Truck, in the UK, is normally used for smaller heavy vehicles — always non-articulated — with specific roles, such as a break-down truck, whereas a large long vehicle is a lorry or HGV (heavy goods vehicle), which will be an artic (an abbreviation of articulated — though this is often confused with the name "Arctic").

In the UK, a silencer is the equivalent to the US muffler. In the US, the word silencer has only one meaning: an attachment on the barrel of a gun designed to decrease the volume of the gunshot to either ear-safe levels or at least lower levels depending on the caliber; although they are popularly believed to completely hide the sound of the gunshot.

Specific auto parts and transport terms have different names in the two dialects, for example:

UK	US
accelerator	gas pedal, accelerator
bendy bus	articulated bus
bonnet	hood
boot (of a car)	trunk (of a car)
breakdown truck / lorry	tow truck
bridleway, byway	horse trail
car journey	road trip
car park	parking lot
caravan	camper
central reservation	median strip
coach	motorcoach, coach bus
crash barrier	guardrail
cycle lane	bike lane
driving licence	driver's license
dual carriageway	divided highway
estate car	station wagon
exhaust pipe	tail pipe, exhaust pipe
fire engine	fire truck, fire engine
flyover	overpass, flyover
gearbox	transmission
gear-lever, gear-stick	gear shift, shifter
gearing, manual (as opposed to automatic)	stick shift, stick, manual, standard
give way	yield, give way
goods train	freight train
goods wagon / truck	freight car
hard shoulder	shoulder
hire car	rental car, rental
hood, soft / hard top	convertible top, soft / hard top
indicator	turn signal; blinker
jump lead	jumper cable
junction	fork (in the road), intersection, junction (see List of named highway junctions in Utah for example, usually only used for transfer-points between major highways rather than general intersections)
lorry, artic. (articulated lorry), juggernaut, HGV (heavy goods vehicle)	truck, semi-trailer truck, semi, 18-wheeler, big rig, tractor-trailer
marshalling yard	classification yard
metalled road	cobblestone road, paved road
motorway	freeway, highway, expressway
mudguard, wheel arch, wing	fender
MPV (multi-purpose vehicle), people carrier	minivan
number plate	license plate
overtake (a vehicle)	pass (a vehicle), overtake and pass (a vehicle, used in law)
pavement, footpath	sidewalk, pavement
pedestrian crossing: zebra crossing (with Belisha beacons); pelican crossing; toucan crossing (both with traffic lights)	crosswalk, marked crosswalk
petrol	gasoline, gas
police car, (panda car)	patrol car, cop car, police car, squad car
public transport	public transportation, public transit, mass transit
racing car	racecar
railway	railroad
roadworks	construction zone, roadwork
roundabout	circle, traffic circle, roundabout
saloon	sedan
silencer	muffler
single carriageway	undivided highway
spanner	wrench
taxi, cab, minicab, cabbie (driver)	cab, taxi, taxicab
ticking over	idling
traffic light: red; amber; green	stoplight, traffic light: red; yellow; green
train carriage / coach	(railroad) passenger car
tram	streetcar, trolley
transport café / caff	truck stop
tyre	tire
the underground, the tube	subway, metro (see variations below)
van, box van, LCV (light commercial vehicle)	light truck, box truck
delivery van	panel truck, sedan delivery
windscreen	windshield
car valeting	auto detailing

===== Rail transport =====
There are also differences in terminology in the context of rail transport. The best known is railway in the UK and railroad in North America, (Note: "Railway" is used occasionally in North America, as for example in the name of the BNSF Railway.) but there are several others. A railway station in the UK is a railroad station in the US, while train station is used in both; trains have drivers (often called engine drivers) in the UK, while in America trains are driven by engineers; trains have guards in the UK and conductors in the US, though the latter is also common in the UK; a place where two tracks meet is called a set of points in the UK and a switch in the US; and a place where a road crosses a railway line at ground level is called a level crossing in the UK and a grade crossing or railroad crossing in America. In the UK, the term sleeper is used for the devices that bear the weight of the rails and are known as ties or crossties in the United States. In a rail context, sleeper (more often, sleeper car) would be understood in the US as a rail car with sleeping quarters for its passengers. The British term platform in the sense "The train is at Platform 1" would be known in the US by the term track, and used in the phrase "The train is on Track 1". The American term for the British return journey is round trip. The British term brake van or guard's van is a caboose in the US. The American English phrase "All aboard" when boarding a train is rarely used in the UK, and when the train reaches its final stop, in the UK the phrase used by rail personnel is "All change" while in the US it is "All out", though such announcements are uncommon in both regions.

For sub-surface rail networks, while underground is commonly used in the UK, only the London Underground actually carries this name: the UK's only other such system, the smaller Glasgow Subway, was in fact the first to be called "subway". Nevertheless, both subway and metro are now more common in the US, varying by city: in Washington D.C., for example, metro is used, while in New York City subway is preferred. Another variation is the T in Boston.

==== Telecommunications ====
A long-distance call is a "trunk call" in British English, but is a "toll call" in American English, though neither term is well known among younger people. The distinction is a result of historical differences in the way local service was billed; the Bell System traditionally flat-rated local calls in all but a few markets, endowing local service by charging higher rates, or tolls, for intercity calls, allowing local calls to appear to be free. British Telecom (and the British 'Post Office Telecommunications' before it) charged for all calls, local and long distance, so labelling one class of call as "toll" would have been meaningless.

Similarly, a toll-free number in America is a freephone number in the UK. The term "freefone" is a BT trademark.

==== Rivers ====
In British English, the name of a river is usually placed after the word (River Thames) however there are a small number of exceptions such as Wick River. This matches the naming of lakes (e.g. Lake Superior, Loch Ness) and mountains (e.g. Mont Blanc, Mount St. Helens). In American English, the name is placed before the word (Hudson River).

== Grammar ==
=== Subject–verb agreement ===
Nouns that express groups but are singular in form, such as committee, Interpol, and the United Nations (called collective nouns), can be used with both singular and plural verbs. This is a form of synesis, and is more common in British than American English.

==== American English ====
In American English, collective nouns generally take singular verbs and either singular or plural pronouns.

- The committee was arguing among itself/themselves during the session.

Despite exceptions such as usage in The New York Times, the names of sports teams are usually treated as plurals even if the form of the name is singular.

==== British English ====
In British English, collective nouns may take either singular or plural verb and pronoun forms.

Singular forms are used when the emphasis is on the group as a whole.

- The committee has postponed its meeting until next week.

Plural forms are used when the emphasis is on the individual members.

- The committee were arguing among themselves during the session.

Compare also the following lines of Elvis Costello's song "Oliver's Army": Oliver's Army is here to stay / Oliver's Army are on their way. Some of these nouns, for example staff, actually combine with plural verbs most of the time.

The difference occurs for all nouns of multitude, both general terms such as team and company and proper nouns (for example where a place name is used to refer to a sports team). For instance,

American English: The Clash is a well-known band.
British English: SuperHeavy is a band that shouldn't work or First Aid Kit are a band full of contradictions;
American English: The New York Red Bulls are an American soccer team.
British English: FC Red Bull Salzburg is an Austrian association football club, they play in the Austrian Football Bundesliga;

== Style ==
=== Use of that and which in restrictive and non-restrictive relative clauses ===
Generally, a non-restrictive relative clause (also called non-defining or supplementary) is one containing information that is supplementary, i.e. does not change the meaning of the rest of the sentence, while a restrictive relative clause (also called defining or integrated) contains information essential to the meaning of the sentence, effectively limiting the modified noun phrase to a subset that is defined by the relative clause.

An example of a restrictive clause is "The dog that bit the man was brown."

An example of a non-restrictive clause is "The dog, which bit the man, was brown."

In the former, "that bit the man" identifies which dog the statement is about.

In the latter, "which bit the man" provides supplementary information about a known dog.

A non-restrictive relative clause is typically set off by commas, whereas a restrictive relative clause is not, but this is not a rule that is universally observed. In speech, this is also reflected in the intonation.

Writers commonly use which to introduce a non-restrictive clause, and that to introduce a restrictive clause. That is rarely used to introduce a non-restrictive relative clause in prose. Which and that are both commonly used to introduce a restrictive clause; a study in 1977 reported that about 75% of occurrences of which were in restrictive clauses.

H. W. Fowler, in A Dictionary of Modern English Usage of 1926, followed others in suggesting that it would be preferable to use which as the non-restrictive (what he calls "non-defining") pronoun and that as the restrictive (what he calls defining) pronoun, but he also stated that this rule was observed neither by most writers nor by the best writers. He implied that his suggested usage was more common in American English. Fowler notes that his recommended usage presents problems, in particular that that must be the first word of the clause, which means, for instance, that which cannot be replaced by that when it immediately follows a preposition (e.g. "the basic unit from which matter is constructed") – though this would not prevent a stranded preposition (e.g. "the basic unit that matter is constructed from").

Style guides by American prescriptivists, such as Bryan Garner, typically insist, for stylistic reasons, that that be used for restrictive relative clauses and which be used for non-restrictive clauses, referring to the use of which in restrictive clauses as a "mistake". According to the 2015 edition of Fowler's Dictionary of Modern English Usage, "In American English which is 'not generally used in restrictive clauses, and that fact is then interpreted as the absolute rule that only that may introduce a restrictive clause', whereas in British English 'either that or which may be used in restrictive clauses', but many British people 'believe that that is obligatory'".

=== Subjunctive ===
The subjunctive mood is more common in colloquial American English than in colloquial British English.

== Writing ==
=== Spelling ===
Before the early 18th century there was no standard for English spelling. Different standards became noticeable after the publishing of influential dictionaries. For the most part current British English spellings follow those of Samuel Johnson's Dictionary of the English Language (1755), while American English spellings follow those of Noah Webster's An American Dictionary of the English Language (1828). In the United Kingdom, the influences of those who preferred the French spellings of certain words proved decisive. In many cases American English spelling deviated from mainstream British spelling; on the other hand it has also often retained older forms. Many of the now characteristic American English spellings were made popular, although often not created, by Noah Webster. Webster chose already-existing alternative spellings "on such grounds as simplicity, analogy or etymology". Webster did attempt to introduce some reformed spellings, as did the Simplified Spelling Board in the early 20th century, but most were not adopted. Later spelling changes in the UK had little effect on present-day US spelling, and vice versa.

=== Punctuation ===
==== Full stops and periods in abbreviations ====
There have been some trends of transatlantic difference in use of periods in some abbreviations. These are discussed at Abbreviation § Periods (full stops) and spaces. Unit symbols such as kg and Hz are never punctuated.

==== Parentheses/brackets ====
In British English, "( )" marks are often referred to as brackets, whereas "[ ]" are called square brackets and "{ }" are called curly brackets. In formal British English and in American English "( )" marks are parentheses (singular: parenthesis), "[ ]" are called brackets or square brackets, and "{ }" can be called either curly brackets or braces. Despite the different names, these marks are used in the same way in both varieties.

==== Quoting ====
British and American English differ in the preferred quotation mark style, including the placement of commas and periods. In American English, " and ' are called quotation marks, whereas in British English, " and ' are referred to as either inverted commas or speech marks. Additionally, in American English direct speech typically uses the double quote mark ( " ), whereas in British English it is common to use the inverted comma ( ' ).

==== Commas in headlines ====
American newspapers commonly use a comma as a shorthand for "and" in headlines. For example, The Washington Post had the headline "A TRUE CONSERVATIVE: For McCain, Bush Has Both Praise, Advice."

== Numerical expressions ==
There are many differences in the writing and speaking of English numerals, most of which are matters of style, with the notable exception of different definitions for billion.

The two countries have different conventions for floor numbering. The UK uses a mixture of the metric system and Imperial units, where in the US, United States customary units are dominant in everyday life with a few fields using the metric system.

=== Monetary amounts ===
Monetary amounts in the range of one to two major currency units are often spoken differently. In American English one may say a dollar fifty or a pound eighty, whereas in British English these amounts would be expressed one dollar fifty and one pound eighty. For amounts over a dollar an American will generally either drop denominations or give both dollars and cents, as in two-twenty or two dollars and twenty cents for $2.20. An American would not say two dollars twenty. On the other hand, in British English, two-twenty or two pounds twenty would be most common.

It is more common to hear a British-English speaker say one thousand two hundred dollars than a thousand and two hundred dollars, although the latter construct is common in American English. In British English, the "and" comes after the hundreds (one thousand, two hundred and thirty dollars). The term twelve hundred dollars, popular in American English, is frequently used in British English but only for exact multiples of 100 up to 1,900. Speakers of British English very rarely hear amounts over 1,900 expressed in hundreds, for example, twenty-three hundred. In American English it would not be unusual to refer to a high, uneven figure such as 2,307 as twenty-three hundred and seven.

In British English, particularly in television or radio advertisements, integers can be pronounced individually in the expression of amounts. For example, on sale for £399 might be expressed on sale for three nine nine, though the full three hundred and ninety-nine pounds is at least as common. An American advertiser would almost always say on sale for three ninety-nine, with context distinguishing $399 from $3.99. In British English the latter pronunciation implies a value in pounds and pence, so three ninety-nine would be understood as £3.99.

In spoken British English the word pound is sometimes colloquially used for the plural as well. For example, three pound forty and twenty pound a week are both heard in British English. Some other currencies do not change in the plural; yen and rand being examples. This is in addition to normal adjectival use, as in a twenty-pound-a-week pay-rise (US raise). The euro most often takes a regular plural -s in practice despite the EU dictum that it should remain invariable in formal contexts; the invariable usage is more common in Ireland, where it is the official currency.

In British English the use of p instead of pence is common in spoken usage. Each of the following has equal legitimacy: 3 pounds 12 p; 3 pounds and 12 p; 3 pounds 12 pence; 3 pounds and 12 pence; as well as just 8 p or 8 pence. In everyday usage the amount is simply read as figures (£3.50 = three pounds fifty) as in American English.

American English uses words such as nickel, dime, and quarter for small coins. In British English the usual usage is a 10-pence piece or a 10p piece or simply a 10p, for any coin below £1, pound coin and two-pound coin. British English did have specific words for a number of coins before decimalisation. Formal coin names such as half crown (2/6) and florin (2/-), as well as slang or familiar names such as bob (1/-) and tanner (6d) for pre-decimalisation coins are still familiar to older British English speakers but they are not used for modern coins. In older terms like two-bob bit (2/-) and thrupenny bit (3d), the word bit had common usage before decimalisation similar to that of piece today.

In order to make explicit the amount in words on a check (British English cheque), Americans write three and 24/100 (using this solidus construction or with a horizontal division line): they do not need to write the word dollars as it is usually already printed on the check. On a cheque UK residents would write three pounds and 24 pence, three pounds ‒ 24, or three pounds ‒ 24p since the currency unit is not preprinted. To make unauthorised amendment difficult, it is useful to have an expression terminator even when a whole number of dollars/pounds is in use: thus, Americans would write three and 00/100 or three and no/100 on a three-dollar check (so that it cannot easily be changed to, for example, three million), and UK residents would write three pounds only.

=== Dates ===
Dates are usually written differently in the short (numerical) form. Christmas Day 2024, for example, is 25/12/24 (rarely, 25.12.24) in the UK and 12/25/24 in the US, although the formats 25/12/2024, 25.12.2024, and 12/25/2024 are now more common than they were before Y2K. Occasionally other formats are encountered, such as the ISO 8601 2025-12-24, popular among programmers, scientists and others seeking to avoid ambiguity, and to make alphanumerical order coincide with chronological order. The difference in short-form date order can lead to misunderstanding, especially when using software or equipment that uses the foreign format. For example, 06/04/05 could mean either June 4, 2005 (if read as US format), 6 April 2005 (if seen as in UK format) or even 2006 April 5 if taken to be an older ISO 8601-style format where 2-digit years were allowed.

When using the name of the month rather than the number to write a date in the UK, the recent standard style is for the day to precede the month, e. g., 21 April. Month preceding date is almost invariably the style in the US, and was common in the UK until the late twentieth century. British usage normally changes the day from an integer to an ordinal, i.e., 21st instead of 21. In speech, "of" and "the" are used in the UK, as in "the 21st of April". In written language, the words "the" and "of" may be and are usually dropped, i.e., 21 April. The US would say this as "April 21st", and this form is still common in the UK. One of the few exceptions in American English is saying "the Fourth of July" as a shorthand for the United States Independence Day. In the US military the British forms are used, but the day is read cardinally, while among some speakers of New England and Southern American English varieties and who come from those regions but live elsewhere, those forms are common, even in formal contexts.

Phrases such as the following are common in the UK but are generally unknown in the US: "A week today", "a week tomorrow", "a week (on) Tuesday" and "Tuesday week"; these all refer to a day which is more than a week into the future. ("A fortnight Friday" and "Friday fortnight" refer to a day two weeks after the coming Friday). "A week on Tuesday" and "a fortnight on Friday" could refer either to a day in the past ("it's a week on Tuesday, you need to get another one") or in the future ("see you a week on Tuesday"), depending on context. In the US the standard construction is "a week from today", "a week from tomorrow", etc. British English speakers may also say "Thursday last" or "Thursday gone" where American English would prefer "last Thursday". "I'll see you (on) Thursday coming" or "let's meet this coming Thursday" in British English refer to a meeting later this week, while "not until Thursday next" would refer to next week. In British English there is also common use of the term 'Thursday after next' or 'week after next' meaning 2 weeks in the future and 'Thursday before last' and 'week before last' meaning 2 weeks in the past, but not when referring to times more than 2 weeks been or gone or when using the terms tomorrow today or yesterday then in British English you would say '5 weeks on Tuesday' or '2 weeks yesterday'.

=== Time ===
The 24-hour clock (18:00, 18.00 or 1800) is considered normal in the UK and Europe in many applications including air, rail and bus timetables; it is largely unused in the US outside military, police, aviation and medical applications. As a result, many Americans refer to the 24-hour clock as military time. Some British English style guides recommend the full stop (.) when telling time, (Note: Recommended for instance by some style guides, including the academic manual published by Oxford University Press under various titles, as well as the internal house style book for the University of Oxford, and that of The Guardian and The Times newspapers.) compared to American English which uses colons (:) (i.e., 11:15 PM/pm/p.m. or 23:15 for American English and 11.15 pm or 23.15 for British English). Usually in the military (and sometimes in the police, aviation and medical) applications on both sides of the Atlantic 0800 and 1800 are read as (oh/zero) eight hundred and eighteen hundred hours respectively. Even in the UK, hundred follows twenty, twenty-one, twenty-two and twenty-three when reading 2000, 2100, 2200 and 2300 according to those applications.

Fifteen minutes after the hour is called quarter past in British usage and a quarter after or, less commonly, a quarter past in American usage. Fifteen minutes before the hour is usually called quarter to in British usage and a quarter of, a quarter to or a quarter 'til in American usage; the form a quarter to is associated with parts of the Northern United States, while a quarter 'til or till is found chiefly in the Appalachian region. Thirty minutes after the hour is commonly called half past in both British English and American English; half after used to be more common in the US. In informal British speech, the preposition is sometimes omitted, so that 5:30 may be referred to as half five; this construction is entirely foreign to US speakers, who would possibly interpret half five as 4:30 (halfway to 5:00) rather than 5:30. The American English formations top of the hour and bottom of the hour are not used in British English. Forms such as eleven forty are common in both varieties. To be simple and direct in telling time, no terms relating to fifteen or thirty minutes before/after the hour are used; rather the time is told exactly as for example nine fifteen, ten forty-five.

=== Sports percentages ===
In sports statistics, certain percentages such as those for winning or win–loss records and saves in field or ice hockey and association football are almost always expressed as a decimal proportion to three places in American English and are usually read aloud as if they are whole numbers, e.g. (0).500 or five hundred, hence the phrase "games/matches over five hundred", whereas in British English they are also expressed but as true percentages instead, after multiplying the decimal by 100%, that is, 50% or "fifty per cent" and "games/matches over 50%" or "...50 per cent". However, "games/matches over 50%" or "...50 percent" is also found in American English, albeit sporadically, e.g., hitting percentages in volleyball.

The American practice of expressing so-called percentages in sports statistics as decimals originated with baseball's batting averages, developed by English-born statistician and historian Henry Chadwick.

== See also ==
- American and British English grammatical differences
- American and British English pronunciation differences
- American and British English spelling differences
- British and American keyboards
- List of dialects of the English language
- Lists of words having different meanings in American and British English

== General and cited sources ==
- Algeo, John (2006). British or American English?. Cambridge: Cambridge University Press. ISBN 0-521-37993-8.
- Hargraves, Orin (2003). Mighty Fine Words and Smashing Expressions. Oxford: Oxford University Press. ISBN 0-19-515704-4.
- McArthur, Tom (2002). The Oxford Guide to World English. Oxford: Oxford University Press. ISBN 0-19-866248-3.
- Murphy, Lynne (2018). The Prodigal Tongue: The Love-Hate Relationship Between British and American English. London. Oneworld Publications. ISBN 1-786-07269-6.
- Peters, Pam (2004). The Cambridge Guide to English Usage. Cambridge: Cambridge University Press. ISBN 0-521-62181-X.
- Trudgill, Peter and Jean Hannah (2002). International English: A Guide to the Varieties of Standard English, 4th ed. London: Arnold. ISBN 0-340-80834-9.
