= Attract =

Attract may refer to:

- Physical attractiveness, personal features considered aesthetically pleasing or beautiful
- Interpersonal attraction, a part of social psychology
- Attract mode, in video gaming

== See also ==
- Attraction (disambiguation)
- Attractor (disambiguation)
- Attracted sequence of tenses, in grammar
- "Opposites Attract", a song by Paula Abdul
