= Pancake sentence =

Linguistic phenomenon in Scandinavian languages

Pancake sentences are a phenomenon in Scandinavian languages where sentence agreement does not follow conventional linguistic patterns. An example from Swedish is the sentence Pannkakor är nyttigt, meaning 'Pancakes are healthy'. There is an apparent disagreement between pannkakor (C.PL) and nyttigt (N.SG). This is similar to notional agreement in English, where American English speakers might say "the team has arrived", syntactically agreeing the singular team, versus British English speakers saying "the team have arrived", agreeing semantically to the collective noun team.

The phrase appears to have been coined by Hans-Olav Enger in a 2004 academic paper, "Scandinavian pancake sentences as semantic agreement" but it was well-known also by classic grammar and was dubbed "constructio ad sensum" or "syllepsis". Enger states that pancake sentences are "where the predicative adjective apparently disagrees with its subject". A similar phenomenon also occurs in Hebrew, where the copula (and adjectives) appear to disagree with the subject.

== Phenomenon ==
An example from Swedish is Pannkakor är nyttigt 'Pancakes are healthy':

Pannkak(a)-or är nyttig-t
Pancake-C.PL.NDEF COP healthy-N.SG
It's healthy to eat pancakes.'

While pannkakor is the plural form of a common (gender) word, nyttigt is in its neuter singular form.

This phenomenon only occurs in the indefinite form. For example, the Norwegian sentences:

1. Pannekaker er godt (Pancakes are good)
2. Pannekakene er gode (The pancakes are good)

In the first example, the phenomenon can be observed.

Pannekake-(e)r er god-t
Pancake-F.PL.NDEF COP good-N.SG
'Pancakes taste good.'

However, in the second example, the adjective is inflected as expected.

Pannekake-(e)ne er god-e
Pancake-F.PL.DEF COP good-PL
'The pancakes taste good.'

== Sources ==
- Enger, Hans-Olav (December 2013). "Scandinavian pancake sentences revisited". Nordic Journal of Linguistics. 36 (3). Cambridge University Press: 275–301. doi:10.1017/S0332586513000280. S2CID 147344472.
- Josefsson, Gunlög (2012). Pancake sentences and gender system changes in Mainland Scandinavian. 25th Scandinavian Conference of Linguistics. Reykjavik. Archived from the original on 2019-09-20.
- Josefsson, Gunlög (2014). "Pancake sentences and the semanticization of formal gender in Mainland Scandinavian". Language Sciences. 43: 62–76. doi:10.1016/j.langsci.2013.10.009.
- Josefsson, Gunlög (December 2012). "Disagreeing doubling det" (PDF). Working Papers in Scandinavian Syntax. 90. Archived from the original (PDF) on 2014-11-30.
- Polysemy and Pancakes
