= Attraction =

Attraction may refer to:

- Interpersonal attraction, the attraction between people which leads to friendships, platonic and romantic relationships.
  - Physical attractiveness, attraction on the basis of beauty
  - Sexual attraction
- Object or event that is attractive
  - Tourist attraction, a place of interest where tourists visit
    - Amusement park attraction
- Attraction in physics
  - Electromagnetic attraction
    - Magnetism
  - Gravity
  - Strong nuclear force
  - Weak nuclear force

== Other uses ==
- Attraction basin (a.k.a. attractor), in dynamical systems
- Attraction (grammar), the process by which a relative pronoun takes on the case of its antecedent
- Attraction (horse) (foaled 2001)
- Attraction (2017 film), a Russian science fiction action film focusing upon an extraterrestrial spaceship crash-landing
- Attraction (2018 film), a Bulgarian romantic comedy film
- "Attraction", a 2023 song by Indo-Canadian rapper Sukha

== See also ==
- Attractive nuisance doctrine
- Attract (disambiguation)
- Law of attraction (disambiguation)
