= Jonathan Chang =

Taiwanese actor

- 張洋洋
- Born: May 1, 1991 (age 33)
- Occupation: Actor

Chinese name
- Traditional Chinese: 張洋洋
Transcriptions
Standard Mandarin
- Wade–Giles: Chang Yang2 Yang2
Yue: Cantonese
- Jyutping: Zoeng1 Joeng4 Joeng4
Southern Min
- Hokkien POJ: Tiuⁿ Iûⁿ-iûⁿ

Jonathan Chang (張洋洋) (Pe̍h-ōe-jī: Tiuⁿ Iûⁿ-iûⁿ; Wade–Giles: Chang Yang2 Yang2) (born May 1, 1991) is a Taiwanese actor, most known for his role as "Yang Yang" in Edward Yang's 2000 film Yi Yi.

== Career ==
Chang was selected to play "Yang Yang" in Edward Yang's film Yi Yi (2000) when he was only nine years old, which Yang won the Cannes Best Director award for that year. The film ended up winning a number of awards, including ranking #3 or higher on various "Top 10 Films of the Decade" lists, covering the decades spanning from 1990 to 2000.

After Yi Yi, Chang appeared in the feature film Da-Yu: The Touch of Fate (2006), directed by Chih-yuan Pan, where he played the title character, Da-Yu. The film ended up being nominated for four awards at the 2006 Golden Horse Film Festival: Best Supporting Actor (Matt Chung-Tien Wu), Best Original Screenplay (Chih-yuan Pan and Hsueh-Jung Liu), Best New Performer (Matt Chung-Tien Wu) and the Formosa Award.

Chang next appeared in the feature film God Man Dog as the character Hsien. The film was directed by Singing Chen, and won the Reader Jury of the "Tagesspiegel" Award at the 2008 Berlin Film Festival or Berlinale. The film also won a Best Screenplay award (for writers Singing Chen and Lou Yi-an) at the 2008 Durban International Film Festival, and the E-Changer award for Singing Chen at the 2008 Fribourg International Film Festival.

In 2012, Chang starred in the short film Before Summer Rain directed and written by Hong-ren Chen aka Isara Chen. The film screened at a number of film festivals, including the 2014 Golden Horse Film Festival and the 2014 Los Angeles Asian Pacific Film Festival. In the film, Chang plays the older brother of the main character, his sister. The older brother eventually gets cancer, which tests the bonds between the siblings.

== Filmography ==
- Yi Yi (2000)
- Before Summer Rain (2012)
