= Evolutionary epidemiology =

Evolutionary epidemiology consists in simultaneously analysing how parasites spread and evolve.
