= Strange Attractor =

Strange Attractor may refer to:

- Strange attractor, in the mathematical field of dynamical systems
- Strange Attractor (album), a 2017 album by Alphaville
- Strange Attractor, a bonus album by Mercury Rev, available with Snowflake Midnight
- "Strange Attractor" (song), a 2012 single by Animal Kingdom
- "Strange Attractor", a song by Nagi Yanagi
- Strange Attractor Press, a UK publishing house

== See also ==
- "Strange Attractors", a 2009 episode of the TV series Heroes
