= Tractor (disambiguation) =

A tractor is a vehicle designed for hauling in agriculture or construction.

Tractor may also refer to:

== Music ==
- Tractor (band), an English rock band
- The Tractors, an American country music band
- The Tractors (album), the band's debut album
- "Tractor", a song by Monster Magnet from Powertrip

== Other uses ==
- Tractor beam, a science fiction device
- Tractor (card game), a family of point trick-taking games played in China and in Chinese immigrant communities
- Tractor, a magnetic tape system peripheral for the IBM 7950 Harvest supercomputer
- "Tractor", nickname of Robert Traylor (1977-2011), American basketball player
- Tractor Brewing Company, New Mexico
- Tractor S.C., an Iranian football club
- Tractor Supply Company, an American retail chain of stores
- A nickname for the British Rail Class 37 locomotive
- Tractor unit, a truck with a fifth-wheel instead of a body, used for pulling trailers

== See also ==
- Bernardo Provenzano (1933-2016), member of the Sicilian Mafia nicknamed Binnu u tratturi (Sicilian for "Binnie the tractor")
- Little Red Tractor, a British children's television series
- Tractor configuration, where the propeller of an airplane faces forward and pulls the aircraft forward
- Tractor Tom, a British animated children's TV programme
- Traktor, DJ software
- Traktor Chelyabinsk, a professional ice hockey team based in Chelyabinsk, Russia.
