= Interstate 495 =

Interstate 495 (I-495) is the designation for the following five Interstate Highways in the United States, all of which are related to I-95:

- The Capital Beltway, a beltway around Washington, D.C., running through Virginia, Maryland, and a sliver of Washington, D.C.
- Interstate 495 (Delaware), a bypass of Wilmington, Delaware that runs through Delaware and partially enters Pennsylvania
- Interstate 495 (New York), a spur from New York City to Long Island, commonly known as the Long Island Expressway (LIE)
- Interstate 495 (Massachusetts), a partial beltway around Boston
- Interstate 495 (Maine), an unsigned connector in Portland, Maine, commonly known as the Falmouth Spur

The following roads once were named I-495:

- New Jersey Route 495, a western continuation of New York's I-495
- New York State Route 495, the approach to the Lincoln Tunnel in Manhattan
- Interstate 87 (North Carolina), a part of the US 64 connector from Raleigh to Rocky Mount, North Carolina; it was signed as I-495 from 2014 to 2017
- Interstate 476, originally planned as I-495 from Woodlyn to Plymouth Meeting, Pennsylvania
