= Synesis =

In linguistics, the change of a word form due to meaning

In linguistics, synesis (from Greek σύνεσις 'unification, meeting, sense, conscience, insight, realization, mind, reason') is a traditional grammatical/rhetorical term referring to agreement (the change of a word form based on words relating to it) due to meaning.

A constructio kata synesin (Latin: constructio ad sensum) is a grammatical construction in which a word takes the gender or number not of the word with which it should regularly agree, but of some other word implied in that word. It is effectively an agreement of words with the sense, instead of the morphosyntactic form, a type of form–meaning mismatch.

Examples:

One hundred dollars is the cost of rent.

If the band are/is popular, they will play next month.

Here, the plural pronoun they and the plural verb form are co-refer with the singular noun band. One can think of the antecedent of they as an implied plural noun such as musicians.

Such use in English grammar is often called notional agreement (or notional concord), because the agreement is with the notion of what the noun means, rather than the strict grammatical form of the noun (the normative formal agreement). The term situational agreement is also found, since the same word may take a singular or plural verb depending on the interpretation and intended emphasis of the speaker or writer:

The government is united. (Implication: it is a single cohesive body, with a single agreed policy).
The government are divided. (Implication: it is made up of different individuals or factions, with their own different policy views).

Other examples of notional agreement for collective nouns involve some uses of the words team and none.

Although notional agreement is more commonly used in British English than in American English, some amount is natural in any variety of English. American style guides give advice, for example, on notional agreement for phrases such as a number of, a lot of, and a total of. The AMA Manual of Style says, "The number is singular and a number of is plural" (thus the number of mosquitoes is increasing but a number of brands of mosquito repellent are available) and "The same is true for the total and a total of" (thus the total was growing but a total of 28 volunteers have submitted applications [not *has submitted]). This is the same concept that is covered by Chicago style (16th ed) at "5.9 Mass noun followed by a prepositional phrase", but not all of the relevant nouns (including "number") are mass nouns.

== See also ==
- Agreement in the English language: Notional agreement
- American and British English grammatical differences: Formal vs. notional agreement
- Collective noun
- Elohim, a Hebrew word whose number varies.
- Pancake sentence – Linguistic phenomenon in Scandinavian languages
- Singular they
