= Law of attraction =

Law of attraction may refer to:

- Coulomb's law, a scientific law
- Newton's law of universal gravitation, a scientific law
- Law of attraction (New Thought), a religious belief
- Laws of Attraction, a 2004 Irish-British-German-American film
- Laws of Attraction (TV series), a Malaysian television series
- Laws of Attraction (2023 TV series), a Thai television series
- "Law of Attraction" (Black-ish), an episode of the television series Black-ish
- "Law of Attraction", a song by Dave from the 2021 album We're All Alone in This Together
- "Use This Gospel", originally known as "Law of Attraction", a 2019 song by Kanye West
