= Attraction (grammar) =

Type of grammatical error

Attraction, in linguistics, is a type of error in language production that incorrectly extends a feature from one word in a sentence to another. This can refer to agreement attraction, wherein a feature is assigned based on agreement with another word. This tends to happen in English with subject-verb agreement, especially where the subject is separated from the verb in a complex noun phrase structure. It can also refer to case attraction, which assigns features based on grammatical roles, or in dialectal forms of English, negative attraction which extends negation particles.

== Agreement attraction ==
Agreement attraction occurs when a verb agrees with a noun other than its subject. It most commonly occurs with complex subject noun phrases; a notable example of this appeared in the New Yorker:

Efforts to make English the official language is gaining strength throughout the U.S.

The head of the subject noun phrase, "efforts", is plural, but the verb appears in a singular form because the local noun "language" in the interceding phrase is singular, and therefore attracts the production of the singular feature in "is". While Bock pointed to this example, it doesn't follow the more common pattern where the local nouns are plural and attract plural marking onto the verb, such as in the sentence:

"The key to the cabinets were missing"

The tendency for plural nouns to elicit attraction more often is caused by a marking plurality as a feature, where singularity is considered part of the default, and that activation of the noun plurality marker is what attracts the plural verb form activation. Agreement attraction not only appears with subject-verb agreement, but also with object-verb agreement in WH-movement in English. Take this ungrammatical construction:

"Which flowers are the gardener planting"

This sentence is ungrammatical because the subject "gardener" is singular, but "are" is plural, which was attracted by the plural noun object phrase "which flowers" that appear just before the verb due to WH-movement.

Object attraction also appears in SOV constructions in Dutch, where agreement attraction occurs between the verb and the local object noun.

"John gave his pencil to the teacher" - "his" refers to "John" as it is a possessive marker

There can be a lot of confusion caused by words that are grammatically plural but conceptually singular such as "scissors", but also those that are grammatically and conceptually plural such as "suds", as well as words that are grammatically singular but can be conceptually plural such as "army".

== Case attraction ==
Case attraction is the process by which a relative pronoun takes on (is "attracted to") the case of its antecedent rather than having the case appropriate to its function in the relative clause. For example, in the following English sentence, the relative pronoun has the appropriate case, the accusative:

This is the boss of the man whom I met yesterday.

The following erroneous sentence, on the other hand, has case attraction:

This is the boss of the man whose I met yesterday.

Because the antecedent, "[of] the man", is possessive, the relative pronoun has become possessive as well. Attraction is a theoretical process in Standard English, but it is common in the Greek of the Septuagint and also occurs in the New Testament.
