= Outline of journalism =

Overview of and topical guide to journalism

The following outline is provided as an overview of and topical guide to journalism:

Journalism – investigation and reporting of events, issues and trends to a broad audience. Though there are many variations of journalism, the ideal is to inform the intended audience.

== What is journalism? ==
Journalism can be described as all of the following:

- Academic discipline – branch of knowledge that is taught and researched at the college or university level. Disciplines are defined (in part), and recognized by the academic journals in which research is published, and the learned societies and academic departments or faculties to which their practitioners belong.
- Occupation – activity or task with which one occupies oneself; usually specifically the productive activity, service, trade, or craft for which one is regularly paid. A type of job.

== Focus of journalism ==
- News – communication of selected information on current events which is presented by print, broadcast, Internet, or word of mouth to a third-party or mass audience.
  - News content
    - Copy – written material, in contrast to photographs or other elements of layout, in a large number of contexts, including magazines, advertising, and book publishing.
    - Courtroom sketch – artistic depiction of the proceedings in a court of law.
    - Photographs – images created by light falling on a light-sensitive surface, usually photographic film or an electronic imager such as a CCD or a CMOS chip. Most photographs are created using a camera, which uses a lens to focus the scene's visible wavelengths of light into a reproduction of what the human eye would see.
  - News formats
    - Article – written work published in a print or electronic medium. It may be for the purpose of propagating the news, research results, academic analysis or debate.
    - News program – is a regularly scheduled radio or television program that reports current events. News is typically reported in a series of individual stories that are presented by one or more anchors. Also called "news program", "news programme", "news show", and "newscast".
  - News style – is the prose style used for news reporting in media such as newspapers, radio and television. Also called "journalistic style" and "news writing style".
  - News values – determine how much prominence a news story is given by a media outlet, and the attention it is given by the audience. Sometimes called "news criteria".
  - News media – are forms of mass media that focus on delivering news to the general public. These include news agencies, newspapers, news magazines, news channels etc

== Modes of communication of journalism ==
News media – are those elements of the mass media that focus on delivering news to the general public or a target public.

- Newspapers – scheduled publication containing news of current events, informative articles, diverse features, editorials, and advertising.
- Magazines – publications that are printed with ink on paper, generally published on a regular schedule and contain a variety of content. They are generally financed by advertising, by a purchase price, by pre-paid magazine subscriptions, or all three.
- News broadcasting – broadcasting of various news events and other information via television, radio or Internet in the field of broadcast journalism.
  - All-news radio – a radio format devoted entirely to discussion and broadcast of news.
- Online newspapers – also known as a web newspaper, is a newspaper that exists on the World Wide Web or Internet, either separately or as an online version of a printed periodical.
- News agencies – organization of journalists established to supply news reports to news organizations: newspapers, magazines, and radio and television broadcasters. Such an agency may also be referred to as a wire service, newswire, or news service.
- Alternative media – are media (newspapers, radio, television, magazines, movies, Internet, etc.

== Types of journalism ==
=== Branches of journalism ===
Journalism by areas of coverage:

- Agricultural journalism -- reporting on agriculture and the food industry
- Arts journalism – reporting and commentary on the arts, including but not limited to announcements and reviews of films, literature, music, theater productions, and architecture.
- Business journalism – reporting that tracks, records, analyzes and interprets the economic changes that take place in a society.
- Entertainment journalism – umbrella term for all forms of journalism that focus on the entertainment business, its products, and participants.
- Environmental journalism – collection, verification, production, distribution and exhibition of information regarding current events, trends, issues and people associated with the non-human world with which humans necessarily interact.
- Fashion journalism – umbrella term for all aspects of published fashion media.
- Food journalism -- reporting and current events related to food and food consumption
- Medical journalism – dissemination of health-related information through mainstream media outlets, including scientific journals.
- Music journalism – media criticism and reporting about popular music topics, including pop music, rock music and related styles.
- Political journalism – coverage of all aspects of politics and political science, especially coverage of civil governments and political power.
- Science journalism – reporting about science to the public, attempting to render the very detailed, specific, and often jargon-laden information produced by scientists into a form that non-scientists can understand and appreciate, while still communicating the information accurately.
- Sports journalism – reports on sports topics and events, including commentating.
- Technology journalism – announces, previews and reviews technology and technology-related events to the public.
- Trade journalism – reports on the movements and developments of the business world by way of articles or analyses.
- Traffic reporting – reports road conditions such as traffic congestion, detours, and traffic accidents, generally as part of a radio or television broadcast program.
- Video game journalism – the reporting and discussion of video games.
- Weather forecasting – application of meteorological science and technology to predict and report the state of the atmosphere for a given location.
- World news – news media-jargon for news from abroad, about a foreign country or a global subject. Also called "international news" and "foreign coverage".

=== Genres of journalism ===
- Adversarial journalism – adopts an oppositional and combative style of reporting and interviewing in an attempt to reveal perceived wrongdoings of powerful actors under investigation.
- Advocacy journalism – intentionally and transparently adopts a non-objective viewpoint, usually for some social or political purpose.
- Analytic journalism – seeks to improve public understanding by making sense of complex situations via analysis and expert commentating.
- Broadcast journalism – field of news and journals which are "broadcast", that is, published by electrical methods, instead of the older methods, such as newspapers and posters printed on paper.
- Citizen journalism – reporting in which public citizens "play an active role in the process of collecting, reporting, analyzing, and disseminating news and information. Also known as "public", "participatory", "democratic", "guerrilla" or "street journalism".
- Civic journalism – as much of a philosophy as it is a practice, this is a movement in journalism that views its reporters as community members rather than as detached observers, and encourages or even expects journalists to get involved in the stories they cover, including participation, contribution, and problem-solving.
- Collaborative journalism – mode of journalism where multiple reporters or news organizations, without affiliation to a common parent organization, report on and contribute news items to a news story together.
- Comics journalism – form of journalism that covers news or non-fiction events in the formats usually found in comic strips or comic books.
- Community journalism – locally oriented, professional news coverage on city neighborhoods, specific suburbs, or small towns.
- Creative nonfiction – genre of writing that uses literary styles and techniques to create factually accurate narratives. Also known as literary or narrative nonfiction.
- Database journalism – reporting in which news content is presented in the form of structured data, as opposed to news stories. Also called structured journalism.
- Drone journalism – use of drones to capture journalistic footage.
- Gonzo journalism – style of journalism without claims of objectivity, often including the reporter as part of the story via a first-person narrative.
- Investigative journalism – form of journalism that applies investigative methods (such as hidden cameras and going undercover), usually to expose crime, political corruption, or corporate wrongdoing.
- Narrative journalism – interpretation of a story and the way in which the journalist portrays it, be it fictional or non-fictional.
- Non-profit journalism – (abbreviated as NPJ, also known as a not-for-profit journalism or think tank journalism) is the practice of journalism as a non-profit organization instead of a for-profit business.
- Online journalism – defined as the reporting of facts when produced and distributed via the Internet.
- Opinion journalism – journalism that makes no claim of objectivity.
- Peace journalism – attempts to correct the value bias toward violence in news about violence, in both the mainstream and alternative media, working with journalists, media professionals, audiences, and organizations in conflict.
- Photojournalism – particular form of journalism (the collecting, editing, and presenting of news material for publication or broadcast) that creates images in order to tell a news story.
- Scientific journalism – practice of including primary sources along with journalistic stories.
- Sensor journalism – the use of sensors to support journalistic inquiry.
- Tabloid journalism – writing that is light-hearted and entertaining.
- Visual journalism – practice of strategically combining words and images to convey information.
- Watchdog journalism – involves reporters as "watch dogs" who help protect or guard society against inefficiency and illegal practices by monitoring activities in a field, including through investigative reporting.
- Yellow journalism (or sensationalism) – writing which emphasises exaggerated claims or rumours.

== History of journalism ==
History of journalism

- History of American newspapers – begins in the early 18th century with the publication of the first colonial newspapers.
- Muckraker – closely associated with reform-oriented journalists who wrote largely for popular magazines, continued a tradition of investigative journalism reporting, and emerged in the United States after 1900 and continued to be influential until World War I, when through a combination of advertising boycotts, dirty tricks and patriotism, the movement, associated with the Progressive Era in the United States, came to an end.
- New Journalism – style of 1960s and 1970s news writing and journalism which used literary techniques deemed unconventional at the time. The term was codified with its current meaning by Tom Wolfe in a 1973 collection of journalism articles he published as The New Journalism, which included works by himself, Truman Capote, Hunter S. Thompson, Norman Mailer, Joan Didion, Robert Christgau, and others.

== Practices and standards in journalism ==
- Backpack journalism – unofficial term for an emerging form of journalism that requires a journalist to be a reporter, photographer, and videographer, as well as an editor and producer of stories.
- Copy editing – (also written as copy-editing or copyediting, and sometimes abbreviated to ce) is the work that an editor does to improve the formatting, style, and accuracy of text.
- Copywriting – act of writing copy (text) for the purpose of advertising or marketing a product, business, person, opinion or idea.
- Editorial independence – freedom of editors to make decisions without interference from the owners of a publication.
- Journalism ethics and standards – principles of ethics and of good practice applicable to the specific challenges faced by journalists.
- Objectivity – principle of journalistic professionalism that pertains to fairness, disinterestedness, factuality, and nonpartisanship in reporting.
- Source – person, publication, or other record or document that gives timely information. Examples of sources include official records, publications or broadcasts, officials in government or business, organizations or corporations, witnesses of crime, accidents or other events, and people involved with or affected by a news event or issue.
- Journalism culture – reflects the extent to which journalists pursue a particular mission and promote certain values. Cultures, internationally, are: populist disseminators, detached watchdogs, critical change agents and opportunist facilitators.

== Legal issues in journalism ==
- Defamation – communication of a statement that makes a claim, expressly stated or implied to be factual, that may give an individual, business, product, group, government, or nation a negative image. Also called calumny, vilification, traducement, slander (for transitory statements), and libel (for written, broadcast, or otherwise published words).

== Social impact of journalism ==
- Fourth Estate – societal or political force or institution whose influence is not consistently or officially recognized.
- Freedom of the press – freedom of communication and expression through vehicles including various electronic media and published materials. Also referred to as "freedom of the media".
- Infotainment – information-based media content or programming that also includes entertainment content in an effort to enhance popularity with audiences and consumers.
- Media bias – bias of journalists and news producers within the mass media in the selection of events and stories that are reported and how they are covered. When this is from being too close to sources it is called access journalism.
- Public relations (PR) – practice of managing the flow of information between an organization and its publics.
- Press service – typically a department within an organization of some kind whose function is to communicate with mass media on topics related to that organization by issuing press releases and using other various means such as public speeches at news conferences, answering questions by telephone or on the Internet.
- Yellow journalism – type of journalism that presents little or no legitimate well-researched news and instead uses eye-catching headlines to sell more newspapers. Also called the "yellow press".

== Journalism occupations ==
- Journalist – collects and distributes news and other information. A journalist's work is referred to as journalism.
- Columnist – journalist who writes for publication in a series, creating an article that usually offers commentary and opinions.
- Conservation photography – active use of the photographic process and its products, within the parameters of Photojournalism activity, to advocate for concrete conservation outcomes.
- Copy boy – typically young and junior worker on a newspaper.
- Correspondent – or on-the-scene reporter is a journalist or commentator, or more general speaking, an agent who contributes reports to a newspaper, or All-news radio|radio or television news, or another type of company, from a remote, often distant, location.
- Dog writer – someone who writes about dogs, for example in reporting on dog shows; or in writing articles about dog care or training or breed features for publications about dogs; or in writing dog- or pet-care columns or 'human' interest articles about dogs for general publications.
- Editor
  - Copy editor – someone who improves the formatting, style, and accuracy of text.
  - Editor-in-chief – publication's primary head, having final responsibility for all of its operations and policies.
- Editorial board – group of people, usually at a publication, who dictate the tone and direction the publication's editorial policy will take.
- Fact checker – person who checks factual assertions in non-fictional text, usually intended for publication in a periodical, to determine their veracity and correctness.
- Food critic – writer who analyzes food or restaurants and then publishes the results of their findings. Also called "food writer" or "restaurant critic".
- Freelance journalist – self-employed journalist who is not committed to a particular employer long term.
- Gossip columnist – someone who writes a gossip column in a newspaper or magazine, especially a gossip magazine.
- Meteorologist – scientists who study meteorology. Meteorologists work in government agencies, private consulting and research services, industrial enterprises, utilities, radio and television stations, and in education.
- Mojo – mobile journalist.
- News analyst – examines, analyses and interprets broadcast news received from various sources.
- News presenter – person who presents news during a news program in the format of a television show, on the radio or the Internet. Also known as newsreader, newscaster, anchorman or anchorwoman, news anchor or simply anchor.
- Photojournalist – reporter who in addition to writing news stories, must often make decisions instantly and carry photographic equipment, often while exposed to significant obstacles such as physical danger, weather, and crowds.
- Political commentator – type of pundit who offers to mass media his or her expert opinion or analyses on political issues and events.
- Political editor – senior political reporter of a newspaper or broadcast media who covers politics and related matters for the newspaper or station.
- Rewrite man – newspaper reporter who works in the office, not on the street, taking information reported by others and crafting it into stories.
- Staff writer – byline that indicates that the author of the article at hand is employed by the periodical that published the article as a regular staff member, and not as a freelance writer or special contributor.

== Journalism education and training ==
Journalism education – Many of the most famous and respected journalists of the past and present had no formal training in journalism, but learned their craft on the job, often starting out as copy boys/copy girls. Today, in many parts of the world it is usual for journalists to first complete university-level training which incorporates both technical skills such as research skills, interviewing technique and shorthand and academic studies in media theory, cultural studies and ethics.

- Journalism school – school or department, usually part of an established university, where journalists are trained. An increasingly used term for a journalism department, school or college is 'J-School'.

== Journalism organizations ==
- Reporters Without Borders – French-based international non-governmental organization that advocates freedom of the press and freedom of information.

== Journalism trade publications ==
- American Journalism Review – U.S. magazine that covered topics in journalism. It is published six times a year by the Philip Merrill College of Journalism at the University of Maryland, College Park.
- Columbia Journalism Review – American magazine for professional journalists published bimonthly by the Columbia University Graduate School of Journalism since 1961.
- Health News Review – web-based project that rates the completeness, accuracy, and balance of U.S. news stories that include claims about medical treatments, tests, products and procedures.
- Review of Journalism – Canadian magazine, published twice annually by final year journalism students at Ryerson University. The magazine profiles personalities, issues and controversies in Canadian media.

== Persons influential in journalism ==
- Edward R. Murrow – American broadcast journalist who first came to prominence with a series of radio news broadcasts during World War II, which were followed by millions of listeners in the United States and Canada. He later produced a series of TV news reports that helped lead to the censure of Senator Joseph McCarthy.
- Walter Cronkite – American broadcast journalist, best known as anchorman for the CBS Evening News for 19 years (1962–81).
- Howard Cosell – American sports journalist who was widely known for his blustery, cocksure personality. Cosell said of himself, "Arrogant, pompous, obnoxious, vain, cruel, verbose, a showoff. I have been called all of these. Of course, I am."
- The "Big Three"
  - Dan Rather – American journalist and the former news anchor for the CBS Evening News. He is now managing editor and anchor of the television news magazine Dan Rather Reports on the cable channel HDNet.
  - Peter Jennings – (July 29, 1938 – August 7, 2005) was a Canadian American journalist and news anchor. He was the sole anchor of ABC's World News Tonight from 1983 until his death in 2005 of complications from lung cancer. A high-school dropout, he transformed himself into one of American television's most prominent journalists.
  - Tom Brokaw – American television journalist and author best known as the anchor and managing editor of NBC Nightly News from 1982 to 2004.
- Ted Koppel – English-born American broadcast journalist, best known as the anchor for Nightline from the program's inception in 1980 until his retirement in late 2005.

== See also ==
- Index of journalism articles
- Journalism genres
