= Relief 2.0 =

Relief 2.0 or disaster relief 2.0 is the deployment of digital information techniques in the management of disaster relief.

== History ==
The first large-scale use of modern digital information techniques was by technology experts and volunteers responding to the Katrina disaster in 2005 in the USA.

Further notable developments came in the disasters that followed, in particular the 7.0MW earthquake in Haiti on January 12, 2010 and the 9.0MW earthquake and tsunami in Japan on March 11, 2011. In Japan, a disaster relief organization was created under the name "Relief 2.0".

=== Academia involvement ===
Following the aftermath of the 2010 Haiti earthquake, a group of fellows, academics, technology experts and emergency response volunteers organized a Relief 2.0 workshop at Stanford University in February 2010 to collect and organize the lessons learned in the field in Haiti. These lessons were further researched and worked on at the National University of Singapore Entrepreneurship Centre in collaboration with the Stanford University Peace Innovation Laboratory and later tested in the field in the Tōhoku Region of Japan after the Tōhoku earthquake and tsunami of 2011. The findings were presented at Kyushu University in Fukuoka, Japan in April 2010 during the TEDxEarthquake9.0 conference.

=== International organization reports ===
In April 2011, the report "Disaster Relief 2.0: The Future of Humanitarian Information Sharing" report was presented at the US Mission to the UN in New York. It was prepared by the Harvard Humanitarian Initiative, in cooperation with the United Nations Foundation, Vodafone Foundation and the UN Office for the Coordination of Humanitarian Affairs (UN OCHA). This report highlighted the role of mass participation using mobile communications, social media and crisis mapping to pinpoint the most urgent needs following a disaster.

== Tools ==
There are a number of tools, toolkits and specific platforms available and used in the practice of Relief 2.0, including Ushahidi Crowdmap, Frontline SMS, OpenStreetMap, Sahana FOSS Disaster Management System and Crisis Maps.

== Private groups ==
Several private, government funded and non-profit groups have emerged in recent years to advance the practice of Relief 2.0, increase preparedness and the effectiveness of disaster response at a local and a global level. These include: Crisis Mappers, Standby Task Force, Sempo, Digital Humanitarian Network and Relief 2.0 Inc.

== See also ==
- Digital humanitarianism
- Crowdmapping
