= Patrick Meier (humanitarian) =

Digital inventor, humanitarian

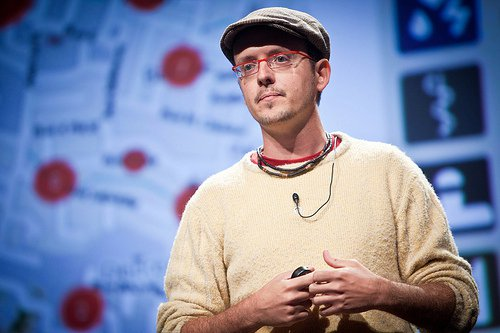
Patrick Meier at the SHARE Conference, Beirut, 2011

Patrick Meier invented the concept of using crisis mapping in humanitarian emergencies, and is a co-founder and the Executive Director of WeRobotics.

== Early life ==
The son of a businessman, Meier grew up in Kenya, Ivory Coast, and Austria.

As a 13-year old in Kenya, Meier created an online map of Iraq during the 1991 Gulf War.

== Education ==
Meier received his undergraduate degree from Tufts University, and studies for his Ph.D. at Tuffs University's Fletcher School.

== Digital mapping of the Haiti earthquake ==
Meier's fiancée was in Port-au-Prince when the 2010 Haiti earthquake occurred. Working remotely, Meier invented the concept of a crisis map by creating an online digital map to help with the coordination of humanitarian assistance. Thousands of people in forty countries pulled information from YouTube, Facebook, and Twitter as well as email, videos and text messages, and input it on the online map. The crisis map was used by United States Marine Corps, and the United States Federal Emergency Management Agency.

== Career ==
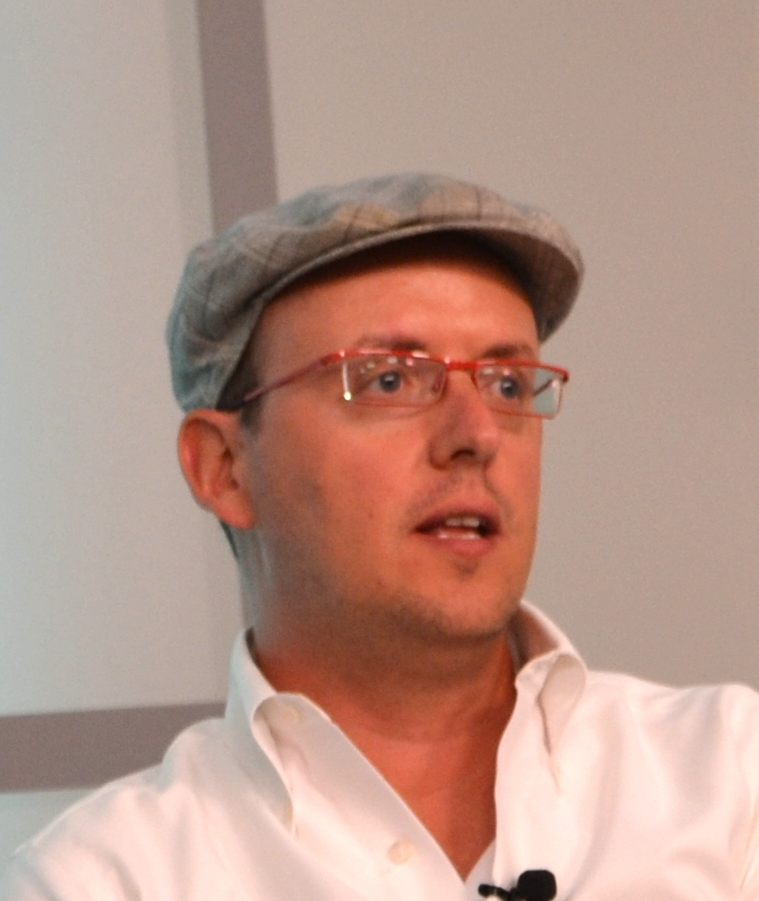
Meier at the Drones and Aerial Observation New Technologies for Property Rights, Human Rights and Global Development event, 2005

Meier worked at the Harvard Humanitarian Initiative and is the director of social innovation at the Qatar Computing Research Institute.

In November 2013, Meier aided the United Nations response to Typhoon Haiyan in the Philippines. Later he criticized humanitarian drone operators for not sharing the information they had gathered with either local authorities or humanitarian agencies, and spoke of the need for a code of conduct.

In March 2014, Meier led a process to update the UAV Code of Conduct.

In February 2015, Meier was a judge in a Dubai based Drones for Good competition.

In the aftermath of the 2015 Nepal earthquakes, Meier used unmanned aerial vehicles to create detailed images of Kathmandu. Speaking later in 2015, he accused many humanitarian drone operators of "causing more harm than good", and spoke of importance of the drone code of conduct.

In 2016, Meier was contacted by authorities in Ecuador who were seeking advice about how to respond to the 2016 Ecuador earthquake.

Meier is a co-founder of WeRobotics, the founder of the Humanitarian UAV Network (also known as UAViators), and a co-founder of Kathmandu Flying Labs.

Meier co-founded the Digital Humanitarian Network with United Nations official Andrej Verity.

Meier is the author of the book Digital Humanitarians.

== Personal life ==
Meier married Christine Martin in 2013, with whom he has a child. They live in Washington, D.C.

== See also ==
- WeRobotics (organization)
- Digital Humanitarians (book)
