= Journalism genres =

The term "journalism genres" refers to various journalism styles, fields or separate genres, in writing accounts of events.

== Ambush journalism ==
Ambush journalism refers to aggressive tactics practiced by journalists to suddenly confront and question people who otherwise do not wish to speak to a journalist, in places such as homes, vacation spots, hallways, and parking lots. Investigative reporter Steve Weinberg of the Missouri School of Journalism describes "ambush interview" as a loaded shorthand term describing the practice of reporters "catching source unaware, usually in a public place, then acting rudely."

The practice was pioneered by Mike Wallace at CBS News' 60 Minutes and was "perfected" by Geraldo Rivera. Bill O'Reilly and Jesse Watters of Fox News Channel's O'Reilly Factor have frequently made use of "ambush tactics," targeting "journalists, whistleblowers, judges, politicians, and bloggers who do not share Bill O'Reilly's political views or just openly criticize him."

The propriety of "ambush" interviews is an issue in journalism standards and ethics. For example, John Amato has criticized "ambush" tactics used by O'Reilly as "very ugly and ... a flagrant abuse of media power." Weinberg writes that such tactics create ethical dilemmas that "can be alleviated if journalists have been persistent in requesting interviews of the source in more traditional, polite ways....Only when all those attempts fail to produce an interview with a key source does it make sense to attempt an ambush interview." Weinberg also writes that when an ambush interview "produces no more than a no comment or a rude rejection from the source," the broadcast of that footage may be viewed as sensationalism. Louis A. Day writes that "some journalists object to ambush interviews under any circumstances, perhaps with good reason."

== Celebrity or people journalism ==
Celebrity journalism focuses on celebrities and feeds off television soap operas, reality television, members of royal families, and the like. This type of reporting is associated with the tabloid press and the "ancillary industries of intrusive paparazzi and lucrative tip-offs."

== Churnalism ==
"Churnalism" is a term for journalism that relies on content from press releases and news agency/wire service copy, with little or no original or independent fact-checking and reporting. This term was coined by Waseem Zakir of BBC News and was popularized by Nick Davies.

== Gonzo journalism ==
Gonzo journalism is a type of journalism popularized by the American writer Hunter S. Thompson, author of Fear and Loathing in Las Vegas, Fear and Loathing on the Campaign Trail '72 and The Kentucky Derby is Decadent and Depraved, among other stories and books. Gonzo journalism is characterized by its punchy style, rough language, and ostensible disregard for conventional journalistic writing forms and customs. More importantly, the traditional objectivity of the journalist is given up through immersion into the story itself, as in New Journalism, and the reportage is taken from a first-hand, participatory perspective, sometimes using an author surrogate such as Thompson's Raoul Duke. Gonzo journalism attempts to present a multi-disciplinary perspective on a particular story, drawing from popular culture, sports, political, philosophical and literary sources. Gonzo journalism has been styled eclectic or untraditional. It remains a feature of popular magazines such as Rolling Stone magazine. It has a good deal in common with new journalism and on-line journalism (see above). A modern example of gonzo journalism would be Robert Young Pelton in his "The World's Most Dangerous Places" series for ABCNews.com or Kevin Sites in the Yahoo sponsored series on war zones called "In The Hot Zone." Additionally, Andrew Callaghan, who operates a YouTube page called Channel 5 News and previously ran All Gas No Brakes, has gained a wide following for his over-the-top and comedic style of reporting.

== Investigative journalism ==
Investigative journalism is a primary source of information. Investigative journalism often focuses on investigating and exposing unethical, immoral, and illegal behavior by individuals, businesses and government agencies, can be complicated, time-consuming and expensive—requiring teams of journalists, months of research, interviews (sometimes repeated interviews) with numerous people, long-distance travel, computers to analyze public-record databases, or use of the company's legal staff to secure documents under freedom of information laws.

Because of its high costs and inherently confrontational nature, this kind of reporting is often the first to suffer from budget cutbacks or interference from outside the news department. Investigative reporting done poorly can also expose journalists and media organizations to negative reactions from the subjects of investigations and the public, and accusations of gotcha journalism. When conducted correctly it can bring the attention of the public and government to problems and conditions that the public deem must be addressed, and can win awards and recognition to the journalists involved and the media outlet that did the reporting.

== Local journalism ==
Local journalism covers topics often about the communities it serves. This model historically relied on local advertising, leading to some conflicts of interest and accusations of boosterism. With local journalism contracting in the internet age, nonprofit news outlets have risen to fill some of the gap in coverage.

== New journalism ==
New Journalism was the name given to a style of 1960s and 1970s news writing and journalism that used literary techniques deemed unconventional at the time. The term was codified with its current meaning by Tom Wolfe in a 1973 collection of journalism articles.

It is typified by using certain devices of literary fiction, such as conversational speech, first-person point of view, recording everyday details and telling the story using scenes. Though it seems undisciplined at first, new journalism maintains elements of reporting including strict adherence to factual accuracy and the writer being the primary source. To get "inside the head" of a character, the journalist asks the subject what they were thinking or how they felt.

Because of its unorthodox style, new journalism is typically employed in feature writing or book-length reporting projects.

Many new journalists are also writers of fiction and prose. In addition to Wolfe, writers whose work has fallen under the title "new journalism" include Norman Mailer, Hunter S. Thompson, Joan Didion, Truman Capote, George Plimpton and Gay Talese.

== Opinion journalism ==
Opinion journalism is distinguished by a subjective viewpoint often expressing a political stance on a contemporary issue.

== Science journalism ==
Science journalists must understand and interpret very detailed, technical and sometimes jargon-laden information and render it into interesting reports that are comprehensible to consumers of news media.

Scientific journalists also must choose which developments in science merit news coverage, as well as cover disputes within the scientific community with a balance of fairness to both sides but also with a devotion to the facts. Science journalism has frequently been criticized for exaggerating the degree of dissent within the scientific community on topics such as global warming, and for conveying speculation as fact.

== Sports journalism ==
Sports covers many aspects of human athletic competition, and is an integral part of most journalism products, including newspapers, magazines, and radio and television news broadcasts. While some critics don't consider sports journalism true journalism, the prominence of sports in Western culture has justified the attention of journalists to not just the competitive events in sports, but also to athletes and the business of sports.

Sports journalism in the United States has traditionally been written in a looser, more creative and more opinionated tone than traditional journalistic writing; the emphasis on accuracy and underlying fairness is still a part of sports journalism. An emphasis on the accurate description of the statistical performances of athletes is also an important part of sports journalism.

(Top) Ambush journalism Celebrity or people journalism Churnalism Gonzo journalism Investigative journalism Local journalism New journalism Opinion journalism Science journalism Sports journalism

== Other genres ==
- Advocacy journalism
- Agricultural journalism
- Citizen journalism
- Comics journalism
- Community journalism
- Data journalism
- Drone journalism
- Enterprise journalism
- Entertainment journalism
- Environmental journalism
- Fashion journalism
- Innovation journalism
- Medical journalism
- Nonprofit journalism
- Online journalism
- Parachute journalism
- Participatory media
- Photojournalism
- Public service journalism
- Service journalism
- Social news
- Society reporting
- Solutions journalism
- Student journalism
- Tabloid journalism
- Trade journalism
- Video journalism
- Video game journalism
- Worker-owned journalism - outlets 404 Media, Defector Media, and Hell Gate NYC are worker-owned.

== See also ==
- News propaganda
- Outline of journalism
