= Digital Humanitarians =

2015 non-fiction book

- Author: Patrick Meier
- Language: English
- Subject: Use of technology in Humanitarian Aid
- Genre: Non-fiction
- Published: January 2015
- Publisher: Taylor & Francis
- Pages: 259
- ISBN: 978-1498726474

Digital Humanitarians: How Big Data is changing the face of humanitarian response is a 2015 book by Patrick Meier.

The book focuses on how to ethically use digital data when responding to a sudden onset humanitarian emergencies. Content includes use of drones for aerial imagery and effective use of Big Data.

== Contents ==
Digital Humanitarians documents the start of digital Humanitarian Action, and the volunteers who respond to emergencies. It is written from the perspective of Meier who is both a digital humanitarian himself, as well as being an academic in the same area.

Within the book is a best practice guide and various tools and resources to help practitioners navigate big data and use of social media in humanitarian emergencies. Contents include the areas of privacy, information veracity, and the role of technology in humanitarian response. It documents how traditional humanitarian agencies find the volume of data available to them overwhelming and how issues of data accuracy can steer digital-amateurs in the wrong direction. There is a focus on ethics and the safety of people throughout the book. Noting the risk of error, Meier advocates for good regulation of technology.

Included case studies include digital humanitarian responses to the 2010 Haiti earthquake, Typhoon Pablo where the Philippines government coordination of digital response was praised, an earthquake in Chile, the Libyan revolution, a fire in Russia, a US superstorm, and political instability in Kyrgyzstan. The book has an emphasis on the value of aerial imagery and the value of unmanned aerial vehicles (i.e. drones) to gather images. It includes Meier's commentary on the psychological and emotional impact on digital humanitarians exposed to images and accounts of injuries and unmet needs, with the Boston Marathon bombing used as a case study. Meier encourages readers to take up digital humanitarianism and gives examples of free and low cost activities that people can do to help others.

== Critical reception ==
Digital Humanitarians is described by The Guardian as a "rousing manifesto urging readers not to feel alone or worthless."

The book was described as "essential reading" for people interested in the intersection of humanitarian response and digital tools by Dimitrinka Atanasova at the London School of Economics.

Writing for the Stanford Social Innovation Review, Lucy Bernholz praised the books encouragement for humanitarian organizations, volunteers and companies to collaborate:

== See also ==
- Crisis mapping
