= Agricultural communication =

Spreading info about agriculture

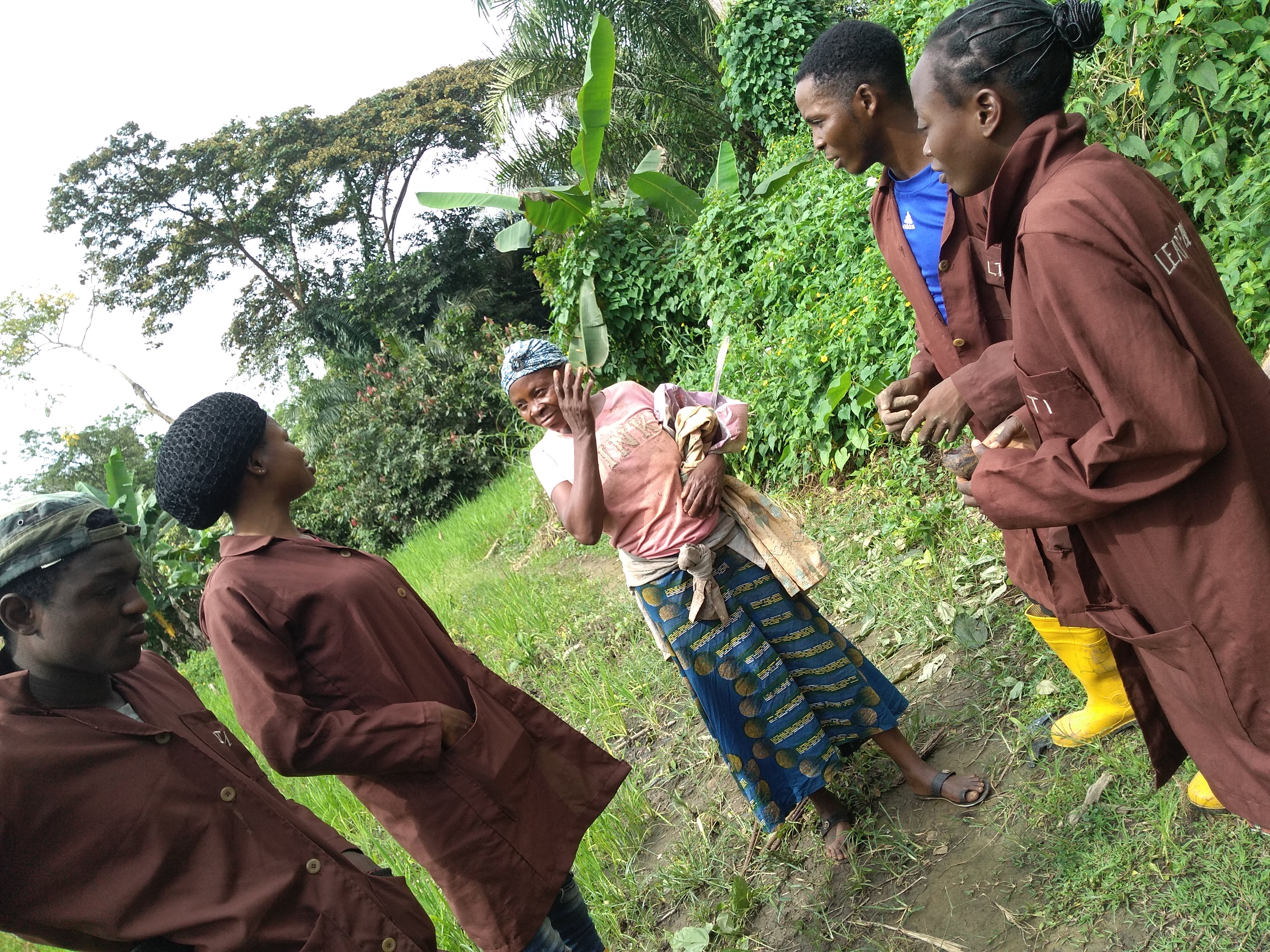
Four people speaking with a farmer in Nigeria

Agricultural communication, or agricultural communications, is a field that focuses on communication about agriculture-related information among agricultural stakeholders and between agricultural and non-agricultural stakeholders and is part of a larger field known as Agricultural Leadership, Education, and Communications typically housed in academic departments in Colleges of Agriculture with other sub-disciplines such as Agricultural Education and Agricultural Leadership. Agriculture is broadly defined in this discipline to include not only farming, but also food, fiber (e.g., cotton), animals, rural issues, and natural resources. Agricultural communication is done formally and informally by agricultural extension, agricultural education teachers, and private communicators and is considered by some to be tangentially related to science communication. However, it is its own professional field pre-dating the formal study of science communications.

By definition, agricultural communicators are science communicators that deal exclusively with the diverse, applied science and business that is agriculture. An agricultural communicator is "expected to bring with him or her a level of specialized knowledge in the agricultural field that typically is not required of the mass communicator". Agricultural communication also addresses all subject areas related to the complex enterprises of food, feed, fiber, renewable energy, natural resource management, rural development and others, locally to globally. Furthermore, it spans all participants, from scientists to consumers - and all stages of those enterprises, from agricultural research and production to processing, marketing, consumption, nutrition and health.

A growing market for agricultural journalists and broadcasters led to the establishment of agricultural journalism and agricultural communication academic disciplines.

The job market for agricultural communicators includes:

- Farm broadcasting
- Journalists and editors of agricultural/rural magazines and newspapers
- Communication specialist or public relations practitioner for agricultural commodity organizations, businesses, non-profits
- Sales representative for agricultural business
- Science journalist
- Land-grant university communication specialist
- Public relations or advertising for firms that specialize in or have agricultural clients

== History ==
The academic field originated from communication courses that taught students in the agricultural sciences how to communicate. Originally, agricultural journalists were needed to report farm news for a much larger agricultural and rural audience. As people moved from the farm to cities and suburbs, a much greater proportion of the population had less direct knowledge and experience regarding agriculture. While a need still exists for agricultural journalists, an equal, if not greater need exists for agricultural communicators who can act as liaisons between an industry with deeply rooted traditions and values and a public with little to no understanding of how agriculture operates and why it is the way it is.

== Research ==
The key journal in the field is the Journal of Applied Communications. Researchers have focused on a variety of areas examining consumer attitudes toward agricultural products and practices including genetic engineering and genetically modified food, natural and organic food and production, and food-related risks. Another area of research has been media coverage of agriculture and agricultural issues. Topics have included media coverage of bovine spongiform encephalopathy (mad cow disease), YouTube videos of California Proposition 2 (2008), and television news coverage of food safety scares.

The Agricultural Communications Documentation Center, maintained by the University of Illinois, compiles research and articles related to agriculture and communications as well.

== Agricultural journalism ==
Agricultural journalism is a field of journalism that focuses on the various aspects of agriculture, including agribusiness, best practices and changing conditions for agriculture. Agricultural journalism is part of agricultural communication, an academic and professional field focused on best practices for communicating about agriculture. This kind of knowledge transfer, both identify the perspectives of agriculturalists in larger news stories, such as weather or economics, and transfers knowledge from knowledge holders, policy makers and researchers, to agricultural producers and other implementers involved in growing or processing food.

Agricultural journalism has its roots in other forms of rural journalism in the mid 19th century. In the United States, journalism focused on agriculture was an important part of rural society, and has become an important source of historical material for researchers of economics and rural society. The late-20th century saw increasing commercial pressure and retraction of the industry. However, recent studies of Agricultural Journalism, suggest that farmers adopt new technologies and methodologies through journalism venues, especially in communities in the Global South. Even with this growth in attention, a study by the International Federation of Agricultural Journalists, found that the average agriculture journalism organization employed less than 5 people.

There is a wide variety of agricultural newspapers and magazines throughout the world. Radio programmes are frequently used for agricultural communication and Farm Radio International is a leading organization in providing programming to developing countries. There are over 55 professional organizations, such as the National American Agricultural Journalists in the United States, and the majority of these organizations are part of the federated international organization: the International Federation of Agricultural Journalists (initially formed in 1933). These associations improve standards, coordination and training across the discipline.

== Academic programs ==
Several colleges offer formal education at the undergraduate and graduate levels in the field of agricultural communication. What follows is a list with links directly to the programs.

- Abraham Baldwin Agricultural College
- Auburn University
- California Polytechnic State University (Cal Poly)
- Colorado State University
- Missouri State University
- North Dakota State University
- The Ohio State University
- Oklahoma State University
- Kansas State University
- University of Florida
- University of Georgia
- University of Tennessee
- University of Illinois
- University of Missouri
- University of Nebraska-Lincoln
- University of Arkansas
- University of Minnesota - Twin Cities
- University of Wisconsin
- University of Wyoming
- Purdue University
- Tennessee Technological University
- Texas A&M University
- Texas Tech University
- West Texas A&M University
- Utah State University

== Approaches ==
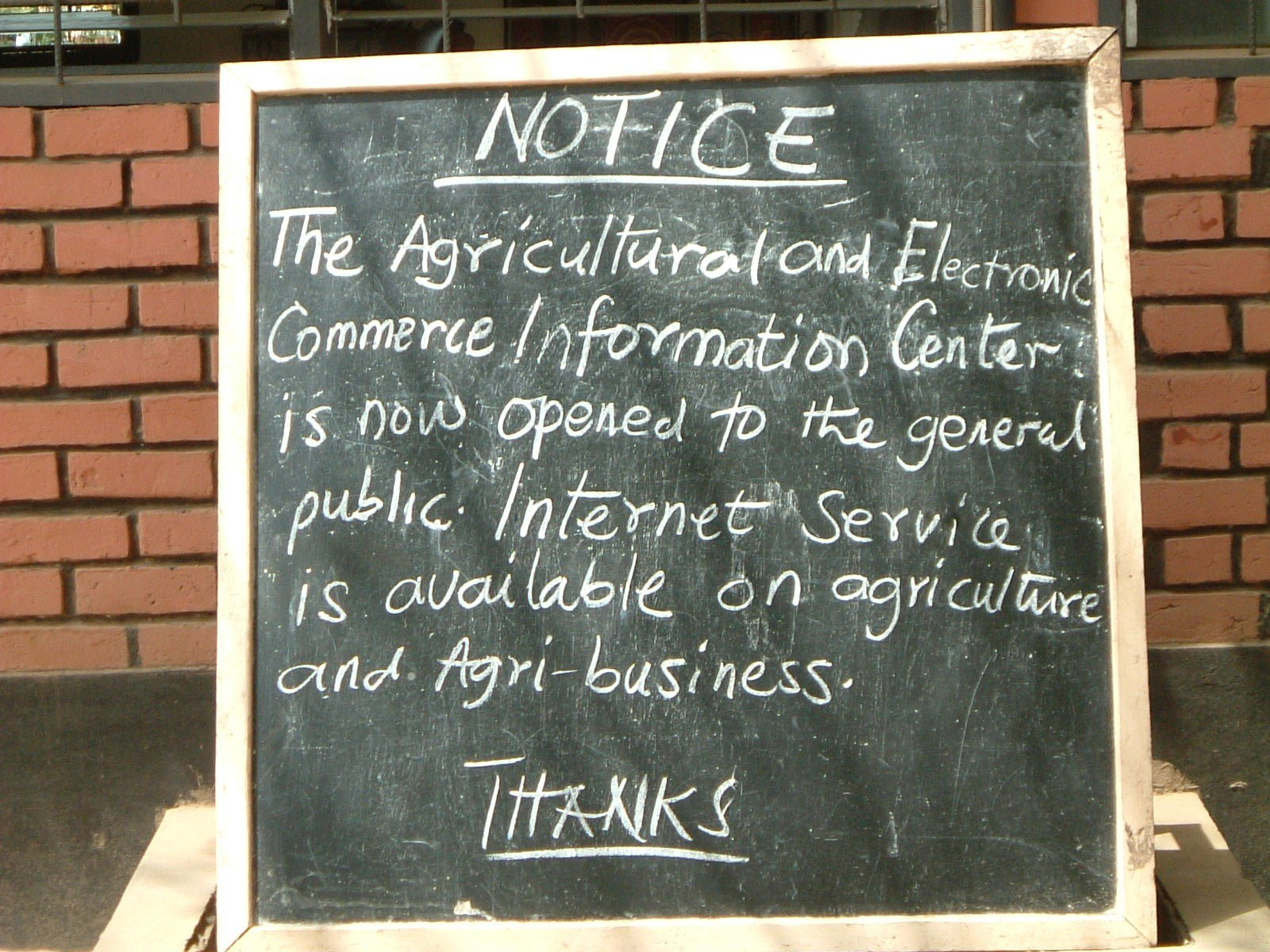
A sign saying that the "Agricultural Electronic Commerce Information Centre" is open

Conceptually speaking, agricultural communication is an applied theoretical field. The academic curriculum and scholarly endeavors typically stay within the context of agriculture, natural resources, and occasionally, the life sciences. It examines communication and human dimension issues as they relate to a variety of issues in agriculture and natural resources. Agricultural journalism is not always differentiated from agricultural communications in research. One could argue that when research focuses on media coverage of agricultural issues or when it examines issues within agricultural journalism specifically (i.e., what influences editors of agriculture magazines to publish risk information), then it is more within the realm of agricultural journalism. Journalism is often seen as a subset of communication that is supposed to be fair and balanced like traditional journalism, whereas the broader field of agricultural communication could potentially be viewed as advocacy communication.

Agricultural communicators are expected to have a certain amount of knowledge and familiarity with agriculture. One could also add to that definition and say the communicator also brings with him or her an appreciation, or even affection, for the agriculture industry. While this is also probably true of agricultural journalists, they at least need to be cognizant of their potential bias to ensure they ask critical questions and present unbiased information. Agricultural journalists are trained like traditional journalists, but bring with them an understanding of agricultural systems and science either through experience and/or academic training.
