= Participatory sensing =

Participatory sensing is the concept of communities (or other groups of people) contributing sensory information to form a body of knowledge.

== Description ==
A growth in mobile devices, for example smartphones, tablet computers or activity trackers, which have multiple sensors, has made participatory sensing viable in the large-scale. Participatory sensing can be used to retrieve information about the environment, weather, noise pollution, urban mobility, congestion as well as any other sensory information that collectively forms knowledge.

Such open communication systems could pose challenges to the veracity of transmitted information. Individual sensors may require a trusted platform or hierarchical trust structures.

Additional challenges include, but are not limited to, effective incentives for participation, security, reputation and privacy.

== See also ==
- Crowdsensing
- Crowdsourcing
- Crowdmapping
- Public participation
