= Sensor journalism =

Use of sensors to generate or collect data in journalism

Sensor journalism refers to the use of sensors to generate or collect data, then analyzing, visualizing, or using the data to support journalistic inquiry. This is related to but distinct from data journalism. Whereas data journalism relies on using historical or existing data, sensor journalism involves the creation of data with sensor tools. This also includes drone journalism.

== Background ==
Examples of sensor-based journalism (below) date back to the early 2000s and usually involve the use of sensor tools to generate or collect data to be reported on. The way in which the sensors are deployed varies. In some cases, a journalist will learn how to operate and deploy a sensor (see Houston Chronicle) while in others (see WNYC Cicada Tracker), the sensors are built and deployed by the general public. Journalists can also request data from existing sensor networks (see Sun Sentinel example) and remote sensors (see ProPublica example).

Sensors used for reporting can be closed source with expressly stated terms of use or open source, which allows for modification of the sensor downstream of development.

Sensor journalism modules have been taught at Emerson College (around water quality/contamination) and Florida International University (around sea-level rise). San Diego State University planned an air-quality sensor-journalism module for spring 2015.

== Examples ==
- Houston Chronicle, In Harm’s Way

A study about toxic chemicals in the air in public parks.

- USA Today, Ghost Factories

A series that looked at lead-contaminated soil in neighborhoods around previous U.S. lead factories.

- Sun Sentinel, Above the Law

A series about the tendencies of cops to speed.

- WNYC Cicada Tracker

A project that revolved around the emergence of Magicicada.

- Washington Post, ShotSpotter

A project with 300 acoustic sensors across 20 square miles in D.C.

- Planet Money, Planet Money Makes a T-shirt

A project that followed the production of a shirt from beginning to end.

- ProPublica, Losing Ground

A study of sea-level rise in Louisiana.

== Related ==
- Citizen science
- Remote sensing
- Crowdsensing
- Crowdsourcing
- Crowdmapping
- Data journalism
- Data visualization
- Citizen journalism
- Environmental monitoring
- Open software/hardware
- Open source
- Open science

== Tools and platforms ==
- OpenStreetMap
- CartoDB
- Xively
- OpenSensors.com
- Public Laboratory for Open Technology and Science
- Manylabs
