= Hui Lei =

Chinese-American computer scientist

Hui Lei is a Chinese-American computer scientist, software engineer, and technology executive. He is known for his work in cloud computing, big data, and mobile computing. He is a Fellow of the Institute of Electrical and Electronics Engineers (IEEE) and a Director of engineering at Meta Platforms Inc.

== Education ==
Lei received a B.S. degree from Sun Yat-sen University, an M.S. degree from New York University, and a Ph.D. degree from Columbia University, all in computer science. His Ph.D. thesis was titled "Uncovering and Exploiting the Intrinsic Correlations Between File References".

== Career ==
Prior to joining Meta, Lei was a vice president at Futurewei Technologies. He was with IBM until 2018, where most recently he was Director and CTO of Watson Health Cloud, an IBM Distinguished Engineer, and an IBM Master Inventor.

The projects Lei has worked on include R3 Messaging, Mercury, and Mobile Crowdsensing. He has over 90 patents to his credit.

Lei was Editor-in-Chief of the IEEE Transactions on Cloud Computing from 2016 to 2019. He served on the board of governors of the IEEE Computer Society from 2021 to 2022.

== Honors and awards ==
Lei was recognized with an IEEE Computer Society T. Michael Elliott Distinguished Service Certificate in 2014. The same year, he was admitted to the IEEE Computer Society Golden Core.

In 2016, Lei was named a Fellow of the IEEE "for contributions to scalable and dependable data access in distributed computing systems." A year later, he received an IEEE Computer Society Technical Achievement Award "for pioneering contributions to scalable access to real-world data."
