= Agricultural journalism =

Agricultural journalism is a field of journalism that focuses on the various aspects of agriculture, including agribusiness, best practices and changing conditions for agriculture. Agricultural journalism is part of agricultural communication, an academic and professional field focused on best practices for communicating about agriculture. This kind of knowledge transfer, both identify the perspectives of agriculturalists in larger news stories, such as weather or economics, and transfers knowledge from knowledge holders, policy makers and researchers, to agricultural producers and other implementers involved in growing or processing food.

Agricultural journalism has its roots in other forms of rural journalism in the mid 19th century. In the United States, journalism focused on agriculture was an important part of rural society, and has become an important source of historical material for researchers of economics and rural society. The late-20th century saw increasing commercial pressure and retraction of the industry. However, recent studies of Agricultural Journalism, suggest that farmers adopt new technologies and methodologies through journalism venues, especially in communities in the Global South. Even with this growth in attention, a study by the International Federation of Agricultural Journalists, found that the average agriculture journalism organization employed less than 5 people.

There is a wide variety of agricultural newspapers and magazines throughout the world. Radio programmes are frequently used for agricultural communication and Farm Radio International is a leading organization in providing programming to developing countries. There are over 55 professional organizations, such as the National American Agricultural Journalists in the United States, and the majority of these organizations are part of the federated international organization: the International Federation of Agricultural Journalists (initially formed in 1933). These associations improve standards, coordination and training across the discipline.

== See also ==
- Food journalism
