= Digital Humanitarian Network =

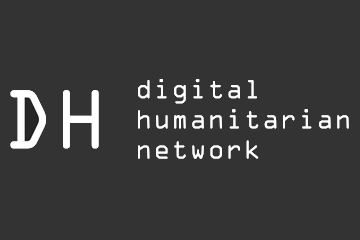
- Abbreviation: DHNetwork
- Formation: April 9, 2012; 14 years ago
- Type: Volunteer Network
- Legal status: Association
- Location: Virtual
- Region served: Worldwide (Online Community)
- Leader: Andrej Verity & Patrick Meier
- Key people: Cat Graham; Kate Chapman; Luis Capelo; Willow Brugh
- Website: digitalhumanitarians.com

The Digital Humanitarian Network is a consortium allowing Volunteer and Technical Communities (V&TCs) to interface with humanitarian organizations that seek their services.

The Digital Humanitarian Network’s (DHNetwork) website was launched on April 9, 2012, by co-founders Andrej Verity from OCHA and Patrick Meier from iRevolution.

In late 2019, DHN noted the maturation of the ability of traditional relief organizations to use modern tools, and announced that they would no longer be activating crisis response teams.

== Mission ==
The DHNetwork's purpose is to support humanitarian organizations in their disaster response efforts around the world.

The network consists of member Volunteer and Technical Communities (entities that manage networks of technically trained volunteers around the globe, who can be activated to backstop disaster response operations and produce information with limited turn over time). These groups have a range of skills from GIS mapping, crowdsourcing, and data analysis and collection, to volunteer management and process design.

The DHNetwork puts groups that have existed for years under one umbrella and provides a single outlet for traditional responders to access the organizations.

The DHNetwork also makes it simpler for organizations to define collaborative projects with the V&TCs.

== History ==
The DHNetwork was created to coordinate action with a coordinator's group at its heart.

The network brings together multiple Volunteer and Technical Communities thereby increasing their visibility both among themselves and the traditional humanitarian community, and has defined an activation process between the VT&Cs and coordinators, so that traditional organizations can submit one request and rely on the DHNetwork to build a solution team with the relevant V&TC members.

== Digital Humanitarian Network Coordinators ==
The DHNetwork is composed of several members who form Solution Teams when the network is activated. DHNetwork Coordinators review activation requests and liaise with the different volunteer & technical teams who are members of Digital Humanitarians to build a Solution Team best able to act on a request.

The Current Coordinators of the DHNetwork are Heather Milton, Evert Bopp, Oludontun Babayemi, and Hilary Nicole Zainab Ervin. They have picked up the baton from past Coordinators Justine Mackinnon, Helen Campbell, in 2014. In 2013, the team included Cat Graham from Humanity Road, Kate Chapman, from Humanitarian OpenStreetMap, Luis Capelo who was a volunteer member of the StandBy Task Force and Willow Brugh from Geeks Without Bounds.

== Previous activations ==
During the 2010 Haiti earthquake, members of online technology communities cooperated to gather, process and share crucial information resources to help aid agencies on the ground, without contributing to 'data noise', by focusing on the information needs of aid agencies and other responders. This collective action was recognised and legitimized after the Haiti earthquake when volunteer communities established a 'network of networks' with the aim of concentrating the abilities online responders on the most urgent information needs during each new emergency.

In the past year, the DHNetwork has been activated five times by OCHA South Sudan, ACAPS, OCHA Philippines, Samoa government and UNHCR (Syria). In each case, the requesting entity sent a central request to the DHNetwork. These efforts resulted in such things as rapid data collection, social media filters to augment traditional assessments, and a translation of the UNHCR Syria portal into Arabic allowing regional civilians to access normally inaccessible information.

1. OCHA South Sudan. Searching the internet for three days looking for reports, articles, and data, the team collected 15,271 unique pieces of information.
2. ACAPS. The team surveyed the internet for Democratic Republic of Congo-related assessments, population statistics, historical IDP numbers, humanitarian events, and indicator values. The group also created several maps.
3. OCHA Philippines. The United Nations Office for the Coordination of Humanitarian Affairs (OCHA) activated the DHNetwork on December 5, 2012, to track the real-time effects of Typhoon Pablo in the Philippines and collect all relevant tweets about the typhoon; identify pictures and videos of damage/flooding shared in those tweets; geolocate, time stamp, and develop real-time maps of displaced people, fatalities, crop damage, broken bridges. The team searched through over 20,000 social media messages within 24 hours of the crisis for photos and videos. Results were compiled and organized in a structured database. The Solution team used a variety of methods ranging from automated algorithms to micro-tasking. They used Geofeedia to identify all relevant pictures/videos that were already geo-tagged by users, PyBossa and a free and open-source microtasking platform. UN OCHA published a map that is entirely sourced from social media analysis.
4. UNHCR (Syria). Translation of UNHCR’s English portal to Arabic, which allows responders, refugees (2 million), internally displaced populations, the global public, and professionals easier access to information.

== See also ==
- Relief 2.0
- Digital humanitarianism
- Humanitarianism
