= Artificial Intelligence for Digital Response =

Artificial Intelligence for Digital Response (AIDR) is a free and open source platform to filter and classify social media messages related to emergencies, disasters, and humanitarian crises. It has been developed by the Qatar Computing Research Institute and awarded the Grand Prize for the 2015 Open Source Software World Challenge.

Muhammad Imran stated that he and his team "have developed novel computational techniques and technologies, which can help gain insightful and actionable information from online sources to enable rapid decision-making" - according to him the system "combines human intelligence with machine learning techniques, to solve many real-world challenges during mass emergencies and health issues".

== How to use ==
It can be used by logging in with ones Twitter credentials and by collecting tweets by specifying keywords or hashtags, like #ChileEarthquake, and possibly a geographical region as well.

== Use ==
- It has been deployed in conjunction with UNICEF in Zambia to classify short messages related to AIDS/HIV received through the U-Report platform.
- AIDR was used for the first time during the 2010 Pakistan floods. The first real test of AIDR took place during the 2014 Iquique earthquake in Chile.

== Related talks and events ==
- Muhammad Imran delivered a keynote talk on the science behind the AIDR system at the International Conference on Information Systems for Crisis Response And Management (ISCRAM).
- Abdelkader Lattab and Ji Lucas also presented the system at the 2016 QCRI-IBM Data Science Connect event.

== See also ==
- Crowdmapping
- Digital humanitarianism
- Social media analytics
- Social media mining
