= Crowdsensing =

Crowdsourcing of mobile phone sensor data

Crowdsensing, sometimes referred to as mobile crowdsensing, is a technique where a large group of individuals having mobile devices capable of sensing and computing (such as smartphones, tablet computers, wearables) collectively share data and extract information to measure, map, analyze, estimate or infer (predict) any processes of common interest. In short, this means crowdsourcing of sensor data from mobile devices.

== Background ==
Devices equipped with various sensors have become ubiquitous. Most smartphones can sense ambient light, noise (through the microphone), location (through the GPS), movement (through the accelerometer), and more. These sensors can collect vast quantities of data that are useful in a variety of ways. For example, GPS and accelerometer data can be used to locate potholes in cities, and microphones can be used with GPS to map noise pollution.

The term "mobile crowdsensing" was coined by Raghu Ganti, Fan Ye, and Hui Lei in 2011. Mobile crowdsensing belongs to three main types: environmental (such as monitoring pollution), infrastructure (such as locating potholes), and social (such as tracking exercise data within a community). Current crowdsensing applications operate based on the assumption that all users voluntarily submit the sensing data leading to extensive user participation. It can also indicate the way mobile device users form microcrowds based on a specific crowdsensing activity.

== Types ==
Based on the type of involvement from the users, mobile crowdsensing can be classified into two types:

- Participatory crowdsensing, where the users voluntarily participate in contributing information.
- Opportunistic crowdsensing, where the data is sensed, collected, and shared automatically without user intervention and in some cases, even without the user's explicit knowledge.

Taking advantage of the ubiquitous presence of mobile computing devices (especially smartphones) in recent years, it has become a convenient method for businesses to collect data without making large-scale investments. Many technology companies use this technique to offer services based on the data collected, some of the most notable examples being Facebook, Google, and Uber.

== Process ==
Mobile crowdsensing occurs in three stages: data collection, data storage, and data upload.

Data collection draws on sensors available through the Internet of things. There are three main strategies for collecting this data:

- The user of a device collects data manually. This can include taking pictures or using smartphones applications.
- The user can manually control data collection, but some data can be collected automatically, such as when a user opens an application.
- Data sensing is triggered by a particular context that has been predefined (e.g., a device begins to collect data when the user is in a particular place at a particular time).

The data collection phase can also involve a process called deduplication, which involves removing redundant information from a data set to lower costs and improve user experience. The deduplication process filters and compresses the data that has been collected before it gets uploaded.

The second stage involves the storage of data in the user's device until it gets another user to share and communicate. For instance, videos monitoring an activity (e.g. traffic) may be stored on a user's device for a specific period and are then transmitted to a person or institution capable of taking action.

An example of mobile crowdsensing is when mobile phone users activate the mobile sensor, including Google Maps and Snapchat that collect and share local information to the internet. The app retrieves information such as location, birthday, gender, and more.

== Challenges ==
=== Resource limitations ===
Mobile crowdsensing potential is limited by constraints involving energy, bandwidth, and computation power. Using the GPS, for example, drains batteries, but location can also be tracked using Wi-Fi and GSM, although these are less accurate. Eliminating redundant data can also reduce energy and bandwidth costs, as can restricting data sensing when quality is unlikely to be high (e.g., when two photos are taken in the same location, the second is unlikely to provide new information).

=== Privacy, security, and data integrity ===
The data collected through mobile crowdsensing can be sensitive to individuals, revealing personal information such as home and work locations and the routes used when commuting between the two. Ensuring the privacy and security of personal information collected through mobile crowdsensing is therefore important.

Mobile crowdsensing can use three main methods to protect privacy:

- Anonymization, which removes identifying information from the data before it is sent to a third party. This method does not prevent inferences being made based on details that remain in the data.
- Secure multiparty computation, which transforms data using cryptographic techniques. This method is not scalable and requires the generation and maintenance of multiple keys, which in return requires more energy.
- Data perturbation, which adds noise to sensor data before sharing it with a community. Noise can be added to data without compromising the accuracy of the data.
- Aggregation-Free Data Collection, which decentralizes the spatial-temporal sensor data recovery through message-passing. This mechanism intends to recover spatial-temporal sensor data the without aggregating participants' sensor/location data to a center node (e.g., organizer), so as to protect the privacy.

Data integrity can also be a problem when using mobile crowdsensing, especially when the program is opt in; in these situations, people can either unintentionally or maliciously contribute false data. Protecting data integrity can involve filtering, quality estimation, etc. Other solutions include installing collocated infrastructure to act as a witness or by using trusted hardware that is already installed on smartphones. However, both of these methods can be expensive or energy intensive.

== See also ==
- Participatory sensing
- Crowdmapping
