= WeRobotics =

Humanitarian Robotics Organization

- Founded: December 2015
- Founders: Sonja Betschart, Patrick Meier, Andrew Schroeder and Adam Klaptocz
- Headquarters: Wilmington, United States / Geneva, Switzerland
- Area served: Africa, Asia-Pacific, Latin America, and Caribbean
- Products: Civilian drones, data, and AI applications
- Website: WeRobotics

WeRobotics is a Swiss-American non-profit organization that connects local experts in drone, data and AI technologies. Founded in 2015, WeRobotics has 41 independent Flying Labs that are located in the Americas, Asia, Oceania, and Africa.

== History ==
WeRobotics incorporated on December 15, 2015, as a 501c3 organization from a collaboration between U.S-based UAViator and Switzerland- based Drone Adventures.

In 2016, WeRobotics, in partnership with the Rockefeller Foundation, tested the development of local knowledge hubs focused on drones and other robotics applications in three countries: Nepal, Tanzania and Peru, which resulted in setup of first Flying Labs. In 2017, WeRobotics started collaboration with USAID, Hewlett Foundation, IADB, and MIT Solve. In the same year, WeRobotics launched new Flying Labs in Fiji and Panama to explore activities in the South Pacific and Central America.

In 2018, WeRobotics introduced its network model to allow for scale of the Flying Labs Network. By end of 2018, the network grew to 17 independent Flying Labs globally, which later grew to 41 by December 2023. It has since grown to include Autodesk Foundation, IADB, Omidyar Network, Fondation Botnar, Jansen PrimeSteps Foundation, World Bank and WFP to mention few. In 2022, Sonja Betschart, Co-Founder and Co-CEO, was selected for Ashoka Fellow in Switzerland, and she appeared on 2024 list of 50 Over 50 by Forbes.

== Activities ==
Since 2016, WeRobotics has worked with communities to create knowledge hubs, called Flying Labs, to support and train local partners to address local problems with technology solutions by deploying technology for social good applications (defined as applications that link to one or several SDGs), including drone data collection & analysis and transportation.

=== 2015-2020 ===
In 2016, WeRobotics in Nepal established the Katmandu Flying Lab which helps in creating and supplying of maps during natural disasters such as earthquakes and landslides. In 2017, WeRobotics in Peru helped in addressing the Peruvian Amazon basin medical issues, and Amazon animal bites by rapid deployment of health care resources using UAVs. In March 2018, in collaboration with the Insect Pest Control Laboratory of the International Atomic Energy Agency and during a Zika virus outbreak, WeRobotics introduced 284,200 sterile male mosquitoes around Carnaíba do Sertão, Brazil to interrupt the reproductive behavior of the fertile mosquitoes.

In May 2018, WeRobotics ran an event to update and expand the Humanitarian UAV Code of Conduct. In 2019, in partnership with Red Wing Labs, WeRobotics worked for the U.S. Centre for Disease Control as a delivery in response to medical emergencies in Papua New Guinea. WeRobotics worked with the Red Cross in Fiji to map damage to buildings caused by Cyclone Keni.

=== 2021-present ===
In 2021, the company released a children's picture book called Ariel & Friends about the use of drones for social good. Since 2022, Flying Labs in Uganda has been helping mitigate risks for coffee farmers by capturing multispectral and RGB imagery via drones with cameras to help spot crop health issues that are often invisible to the human eye alone. Flying Labs works with World Vision in implementation of various projects, like in large scale reforestation in Kenya in 2021, and in farmer-managed natural regeneration in Tanzania.

In May 2022, Kenyan Flying Labs with EPFL's Laboratory of Urban Transport Systems (LUTS), launched a joint experiment to test LUTS' innovative approach to traffic congestion in Nairobi. Flying Labs helps in surveying of land for irrigation and agriculture in Burkina Faso.
