= International Federation of Agricultural Journalists =

The International Federation of Agricultural Journalists (IFAJ) is a professional association for agricultural journalists and agricultural communicators. IFAJ is non-political, and has more than 5000 members in 55 countries.

IFAJ was founded in Paris, France in 1956 as Union internationale des journalistes agricoles (UJA). The current president is Lena Johansson (Sweden), who has been president since 2020.
