= Crowdmapping =

Crowdmapping is a subtype of crowdsourcing by which aggregation of crowd-generated inputs such as captured communications and social media feeds are combined with geographic data to create a digital map that is as up-to-date as possible on events such as wars, humanitarian crises, crime, elections, or natural disasters. Such maps are typically created collaboratively by people coming together over the Internet.

The information can typically be sent to the map initiator or initiators by SMS or by filling out a form online and are then gathered on a map online automatically or by a dedicated group. In 2010, Ushahidi released "Crowdmap" − a free and open-source platform by which anyone can start crowdmapping projects.

== Uses ==
Crowdmapping can be used to track fires, floods, pollution, crime, political violence, the spread of disease and bring a level of transparency to fast-moving events that are difficult for traditional media to adequately cover, or problem areas and longer-term trends and that may be difficult to identify through the reporting of individual events.

During disasters the timeliness of relevant maps is critical as the needs and locations of victims may change rapidly.

The use of crowdmapping by authorities can improve situational awareness during an incident and be used to support incident response.

Crowdmaps are an efficient way to visually demonstrate the geographical spread of a phenomenon.

=== Examples ===
- HealthMap is a freely accessible, automated electronic information system in operation since 2006 that monitors, organizes, and visualizes reports of global disease outbreaks according to geography, time, and infectious disease agent that also crowdsources user data.
- 2007–08 Kenyan crisis
- In the 2010 Haiti earthquake the Ushahidi crowdmapping platform was used to map more than 3584 events in close to real time, including breakout of fires and people trapped under buildings.
- The Humanitarian OpenStreetMap Team organizes volunteers to rapidly update OpenStreetMap in areas of natural disasters, since 2010. Worldwide volunteers use aerial and satellite photography to increase the level of detail in regional maps, frequently within a few days of the crisis, while on-site disaster relief workers provide relevant information such as where buildings and roads have been destroyed or repaired.
- One week after the Fukushima Daiichi nuclear disaster in 2011 the Safecast project was launched that loaned volunteers cheap Geiger counters to measure local levels of radioactivity (or volunteers purchased their own device). This data was mapped and made publicly available through their website.
- Hurricane Irene in 2011
- In 2012 the Danish daily newspaper and online title Dagbladet Information mapped the positions of surveillance cameras by encouraging readers to use a free Android and iOS app to photograph and geolocate CCTV cameras.
- In 2013, predict the reemergence of cicada swarms, WNYC—a public radio station in New York City—asked residents of certain areas to use sensors to track the soil temperature. The crowd-reported temperatures were displayed on a map on WNYC’s website.
- April 2015 Nepal earthquake

== See also ==
- 3D reconstruction from multiple images
- Sensor journalism
- Crisis mapping
- Mass collaboration
- Big data
- Data activism
- Artificial Intelligence for Digital Response
- Participatory monitoring
- Heat map
- Crowdsensing
- Participatory sensing
