= Access journalism =

Type of journalism

Access journalism, or access reporting, refers to journalism (often in interview form) which prioritizes access—meaning media time with important, rich, famous, powerful, or otherwise influential people in politics, culture, sports, business, technology, and other areas—over journalistic objectivity and/or integrity.

Journalist Tom Foremski notes that access plays a role in journalism due to reporters relying on the access to influential people, such as CEOs, to keep their jobs. Though this does not always translate to more factual reporting, some companies may exploit the journalists' need for access, or encourage a level of friendliness between media and executive.

== Features ==
Typical features of access journalism include:

- absence of demanding accountability towards the questioned respondent
- avoiding controversial topics so as to maintain access to the respondent
- can be vague and non-specific
- pre-approved questions, no gotcha questions, softball questions
- sometimes even respondent's control over how the interview will be edited and which parts will be aired
- can be published quickly and distributed widely

Access journalism, in some cases, is similar to infomercials, or advertising disguised as news. The venture of doing the interview can be symbiotic—beneficial for both the journalist and the celebrity, since it can synergically bring more attention to both of them, and further notability, influence, media exposure, current relevance, etc., for both of them.

Access journalism has been contrasted with accountability journalism. A similar contrast is between lapdog journalism and watchdog journalism.

== See also ==
- Journalistic objectivity
