= HealthNewsReview.org =

Former website that reviewed medical news

- Website type: Review website
- Available in: English
- Owner: Schwitzer Health News LLC
- Creator: Gary Schwitzer
- Website: HealthNewsReview.org
- Commercial: no
- Registration: optional
- Launched: 2006-04-16
- Current status: discontinued

HealthNewsReview.org was a web-based project that rated the completeness, accuracy, and balance of news stories that include claims about medical treatments, tests, products and procedures.

== History ==
The Founder and Publisher is Gary Schwitzer, a health care journalist for more than four decades who is now an Adjunct Associate Professor in the University of Minnesota School of Public Health. The project's 10-point grading scale includes whether a story gives information about its sources and their competing interests, quantifies the benefits of a treatment, and appraises the evidence supporting the story's claims.

== Operations ==
In its first 22 months, the website reviewed 500 news stories, and found that they usually failed to discuss evidence quality, alternative options, costs, and absolute sizes of benefits and harms. At that time, the editors of the journal PLoS Medicine wrote: "Schwitzer's alarming report card of the trouble with medical news stories is thus a wake-up call for all of us involved in disseminating health research-researchers, academic institutions, journal editors, reporters, and media organizations-to work collaboratively to improve the standards of health reporting."

In 2011, the Columbia Journalism Review published an update on the site's findings.

In 2006, the year the project launched, it was honored with a Knight-Batten Award for Innovations in Journalism. In 2007, it won a Mirror Award to honor those "who hold a mirror to their own industry for the public's benefit." In 2009, Schwitzer's blog was named "Best Medical Blog" in competition hosted by Medgadget.com.

The organization once reviewed news on television but ceased in 2009.

In 2014, Schwitzer published an article in the journal JAMA Internal Medicine, providing an update on the lessons learned after 8 years with the HealthNewsReview.org project.

In 2015, the project also began systematically reviewing health care news releases written by public relations professionals. By 2018, the editorial team had reviewed more than 500 such PR news releases to go along with more than 2,500 reviews of news stories.

== Discontinued ==
In 2018, the publication ceased regular daily updates, noting that it would continue to keep old articles available online "for a couple of years" and that the publisher and contributors might post occasional new articles.

Starting from mid-2022, the website domain became fully unavailable.
