= Drone journalism =

Use of unmanned aircraft for journalism

Drone journalism is the use of drones, or unmanned aircraft systems (UAS), for journalistic purposes. According to the Federal Aviation Administration, "an unmanned aircraft is a device that is used, or is intended to be used, for flight in the air with no onboard pilot".

The use of drones for information collection in the journalism industry is still new. In the past, reporters would take aerial footage with helicopters, which are often rented and incur higher production costs. Drone technology allows journalists to take footage of news events such as volcanic eruptions, war-torn villages, and natural disasters. Because drones are operated remotely, journalists see it as safer and cost-efficient means of video recording, especially in highly vulnerable coverage.

Several universities, companies, and NGOs are testing drones in this context, namely the Drone Journalism Lab, founded in late November 2011 by Matt Waite, professor in the College of Journalism and Mass Communications at the University of Nebraska–Lincoln, the Drone Journalism Program at the University of Missouri, the Civic Drone Centre based at the University of Central Lancashire, and africanDRONE, based in Cape Town, South Africa.

== Drone regulation ==
The use of drones is regulated primarily by the civil aviation authority (CAA) of each country, although permissions from other government agencies or departments may need to be obtained. As each NAA sets its own regulations for drones they can vary widely from one country to the next, this poses a problem for journalists or media organisations who wish to use drones in more than one country. In parts of Africa and Asia, drone laws are unnecessarily restrictive, expensive, and opaque. There are currently efforts to harmonise regulations internationally, particularly in the European Union.

== Research ==
=== India ===
Drone journalism was introduced in India to Sisanda Magwaza first at IIMC in 2019 as an additional workshop in course curriculum. Since then a number of such workshops have been conducted in various schools that teach Mass Communications. This workshop is conducted by Squadron leader Varsha Kukreti (retd.), Group Captain MJ Augustine Vinoth (retd.) Vishist Sewa Medal for English and Hindi journalism students. The couple have written a chapter in the book called Beat Reporting and Editing on Drone Journalism. They are calling it DoJo. Their workshop explains legalities, hands on training in drone flying, teach how to capture footage with drones, and converting it into a media bite. They also explain how it could be an effective tool for Investigative Journalism. The workshop at IIMC India is organized by Dr. Surbhi Dahiya.

=== Africa ===
In 2018 africanDRONE was formally established as a non-profit organization in South Africa. africanDRONE is an organization of drone pilots, journalists, enthusiasts and advocates which seeks to encourage the use of drones in media and journalism. It has its own ethics and operations manual (adapted from the University of Nebraska Drone Journalism Lab) and provides a repository of legal information on drone laws in various African countries. africanDRONE has worked with major international media houses across Africa, Europe and the USA.

=== Canada ===
In 2014 the College of the North Atlantic produced a drone journalism code of conduct.

=== United Kingdom ===
In 2013 the University of Oxford's Reuters Institutes for the Study of Journalism published a report on the challenges and opportunities of drones in news gathering. The University of Central Lancashire's Media Innovation Studio and Civic Drone Centre are investigating non-visual methods of gathering data for journalistic use.

=== United States ===
The concept of drone journalism was first explored in 2002 at The Poynter Institute for Media Studies by Larry Larsen who looked at the ethical and practical use of unmanned aerial vehicles for reporting and research. Larsen taught journalists from around the world about the capabilities and possibilities of using an Unmanned aerial vehicle for investigative reporting and in the summer of 2003 built the first UAV specifically for drone journalism using a quadcopter platform streaming wireless video that was recorded in the field using an Archos AV300.

In 2012 Matt Waite founded the University of Nebraska–Lincoln's Drone Journalism Lab to explore how drones can be used for reporting. More specifically, the lab's purpose is to provide a place for the study of the ethicality, legality, and practicality of drone use in journalism. The lab's website plays a key role in the drone journalism debate, as it provides an online discussion platform, as well as links to and analysis of research and news articles. In 2013 Waite received a cease-and-desist notice from the Federal Aviation Administration.

Matthew Schroyer is a drone and data journalist based in Urbana, Illinois, and blogger on drone journalism at MentalMuniton.com, and founder of the Professional Society of Drone Journalists (PSDJ), located at DroneJournalism.org. He currently develops drone technology and small unmanned aerial vehicles (sUAV) for use in journalistic ventures. As part of his work on EnLiST, a National Science Foundation grant at the University of Illinois, Schroyer heads the "Drones for Schools" program, through which high school students learn engineering design and STEM concepts for the building and operating of their own unmanned aerial vehicles for photomapping.

Scott Pham is the founder and director of the Missouri Drone Journalism Program, a partnership between the Missouri School of Journalism, the University of Missouri Information Technology Program, and NPR member station KBIA.

== Ethics considerations ==
A significant concern with the use of UAS for journalistic reporting is the potential for invading people's privacy, such as unobstructed views of individuals and private property. A crucial question is whether individuals have the right to expect privacy when their picture is being taken from up to several thousand feet above the ground. Furthermore, the ethical considerations surrounding satellite images come into play: What are the ethical boundaries of news-gathering from satellites in space?

On April 3, 2013, the FAA held an "engagement session" on drone privacy, in which the public could engage in discussion on such questions of privacy. Opinions expressed during the session can generally be summarized in five overarching concerns:

- privacy risks (use of drones should be tightly regulated and subject to transparency procedures);
- mission creep (some were worried about the introduction of drones into US airspace would lead to growing use of increasingly advanced drone technology in policing operations);
- opposition to government regulations on citizens' rights to own drones;
- safety hazards (unmanned aircraft pose safety risks to manned aircraft);
- drones as the future of aviation and an overblown preoccupation with privacy and safety concerns.

With discussion of drone use for journalistic reasons increasing in the public sphere, non-commercial journalists will be responsible for establishing professional standards, as it is possible that the FAA will not release new regulations until 2015. Waite and Schroyer both hold that existing journalistic ethics codes can apply to drones, as the principles behind these ethics codes are broad. In an article in the Society of Professional Journalists' Quill Magazine, Waite is paraphrased as saying that he approaches ethical questions of drone journalism by first checking to see whether a question has been dealt with before, as many of questions in drone journalism debates have already been raised with regard to journalistic use of telephoto lenses and helicopters. The article quotes Waite, "We keep asking ourselves: Is this a new ethical problem, or an old ethical problem with new technology?"

In an effort to professionalize the journalistic practice of using drones, Schroyer and the members of DroneJournalism.org are seeking to create a drone journalism code of ethics, including appeals for use of drones only when there is no safer method of procuring the information needed. This code does hold, however, that violation of state laws and FAA regulations may be necessary in order to access critical information.

== Examples ==
=== 2013 ===
- In October 2013, a BBC news crew used a drone for the first time.

=== 2014 ===
- The Daily Dot used a Phantom drone for first-hand footage of a building that collapsed in Harlem in March 2014.

=== 2015 ===
- In June 2015, the Manchester Evening News used a drone to create an interactive virtual tour of Heaton Park, Manchester for the Parklife music festival.

=== 2016 ===
- In April 2016, photographer Johnny Miller began the Unequal Scenes project using a drone, sparking worldwide debate and conversation around drones journalism and inequality.
