= Crisis mapping =

Real-time gathering, display and analysis of data during a crisis

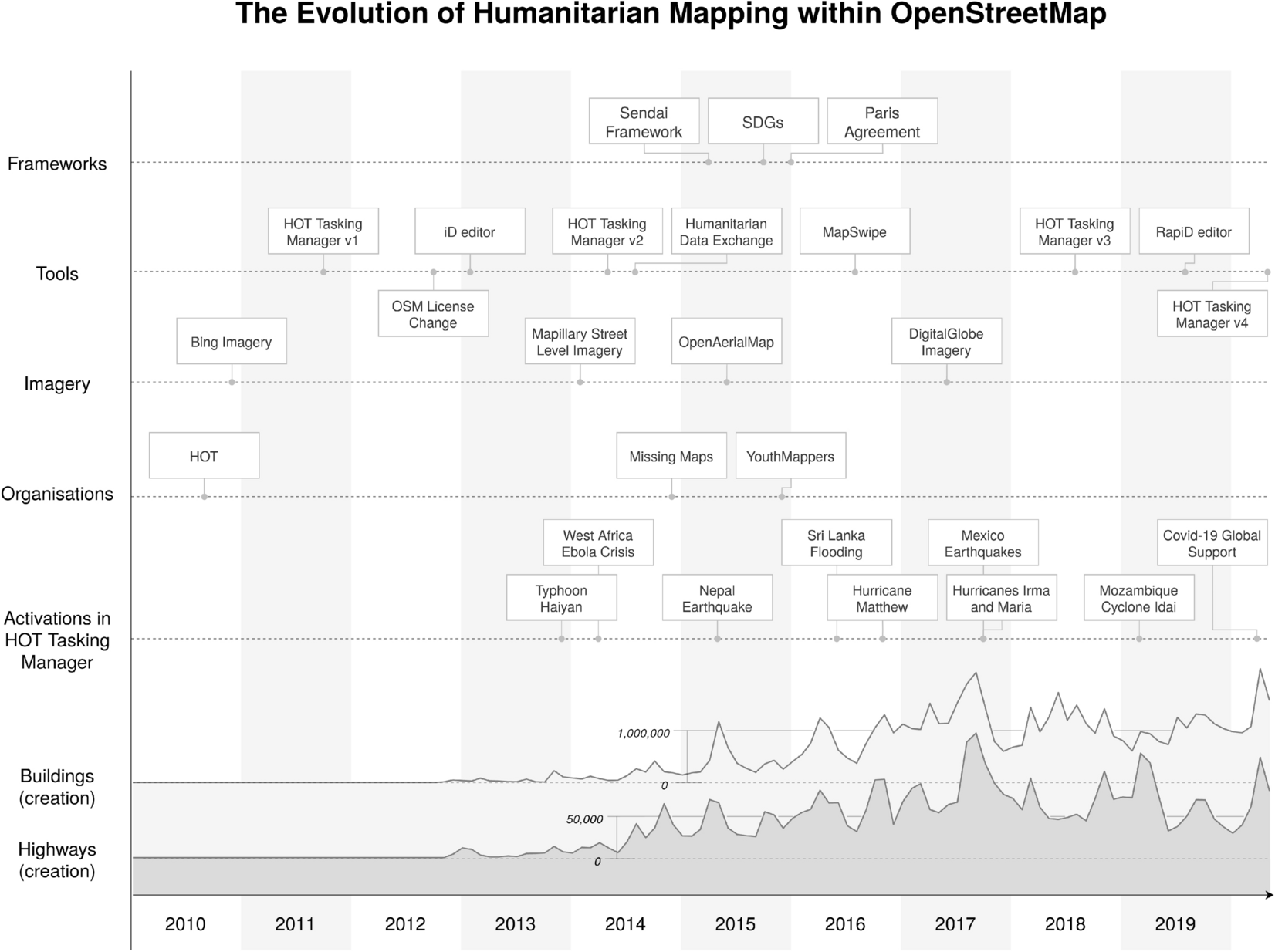
Evolution of humanitarian mapping in OpenStreetMap in regard to major disaster activations, the socio-technical development of the community and global political frameworks.

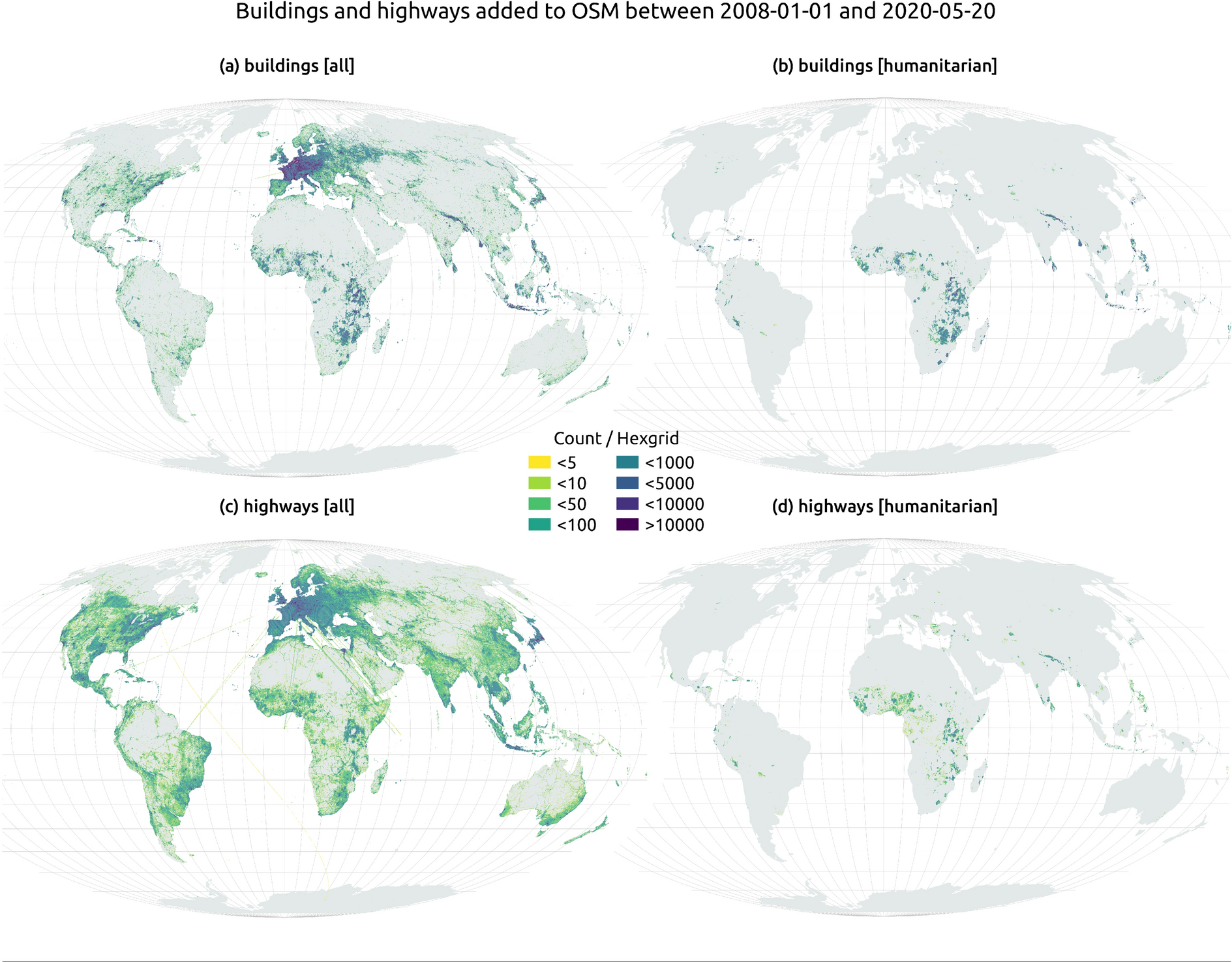
Spatial distribution of the number of buildings (top) and highways (bottom) added to OpenStreetMap between 2008-01-01 and 2020-05-20 in regard to overall (left) and humanitarian (right) mapping activities

Crisis mapping (also known as disaster mapping) is the real-time gathering, display and analysis of data during a crisis, usually a natural disaster or social/political conflict (violence, elections, etc.). Crisis mapping projects usually allow large numbers of people, including the public and crisis responders, to contribute information either remotely or from the site of the crisis. One benefit of the crisis mapping method over others is that it can increase situational awareness, since the public can report information and improve data management.

Crisis mappers work with data that comes from diverse sources and can be produced for varying purposes. As such, there is some overlap with big data, international development, and community engagement.

== History ==
One of the first major events to utilize crisis mapping was the 2010 Haiti earthquake, which killed and injured hundreds of thousands of people and left homes and infrastructure badly damaged. People who wanted to help started mapping the basic infrastructure, especially in OpenStreetMap, and were then able to do more detailed mapping as better resources became available. Crisis mapping in one form or another has been used in many crises since then. Many volunteers had also joined to help with data responses to crises and to build new information-handling tools for both crisis mappers and crisis responders in the field.

Since 2010, crisis mappers have mapped events in Libya (refugees), Japan (crowdsourcing and radiation monitoring for 2011 Tōhoku earthquake and tsunami), Chile (Humanitarian response to the 2010 Chile earthquake), Pakistan (2010 Pakistan floods, 2011 floods), Somalia (refugees), Alabama (2011 Super Outbreak), and dozens of smaller disasters and events around the world.

Zaatari refugee camp in Jordan, hosting Syrians escaping the war, is being actively mapped on OpenStreetMap by UNHCR and REACH workers.

== Techniques ==
Crisis mapping leverage the following tools and methods to power effective early warning for rapid response to complex humanitarian emergencies:

- Mobile and web-based applications,
- Participatory maps and crowdsourced event data,
- Aerial and satellite imagery,
- Geospatial platforms,
- Advanced visualization,
- Live simulation, and
- Computational and statistical models

Crisis mappers are usually volunteers, meaning they contribute non-wage labor. They can be professional mappers, software developers, data analysts, or members of the public. Since it is a new field, crisis mapping engages users' existing skills, rather than field-specific skills. However, new skills are often acquired during "deployments", where a crisis mapping organization and interface is established to begin collecting data.

Instances of crisis mapping usually have a goal to process and/or produce data that would be of value in the crisis. Examples of processing data include geolocating news reports, and classifying or translating text messages. It is common to scrape social media sites for crisis-specific keywords. For instance, crisis mapping can include gathering tweets that have a specific designated hashtag. Examples of producing data are creating geographic data by "tracing" buildings or roads on aerial imagery, identifying refugee camps in aerial imagery.

These activities are usually crowdsourced to one degree or another and coordinated via online applications. Dedicated software is often used, for example based on Ushahidi or Sahana. "Mechanical-turk" techniques are sometimes used to break up tasks into tiny chunks that can be completed quickly. Often social technologies are also frequently used, like Skype or Google Drive.

== Crisis mapping organizations ==
Crisis mappers are online teams of people, usually volunteers, who gather and provide data online to people responding to and people affected by disasters. To gather and organize the data, groups have formed to organize volunteers into teams to execute certain tasks. Organizations active in crisis mapping include:

- Humanitarian OpenStreetMap Team
- Humanity Road
- Sahana
- Crisis Cleanup
- European-Mediterranean Seismological Centre

== See also ==
- Crowdmapping

== Notes ==
- PBS "Need to Know" program on "Crisis Mapping", May 13th 2011
- Jen Ziemke overview of crisis mapping
