= IMRAD =

Document format for reporting studies in the scientific literature

In scientific writing, IMRAD or IMRaD (/ˈɪmræd/) (Introduction, Methods, Results, and Discussion) is a common organizational structure for the format of a document. IMRaD is the most prominent norm for the structure of a scientific journal article of the original research type.

== Overview ==
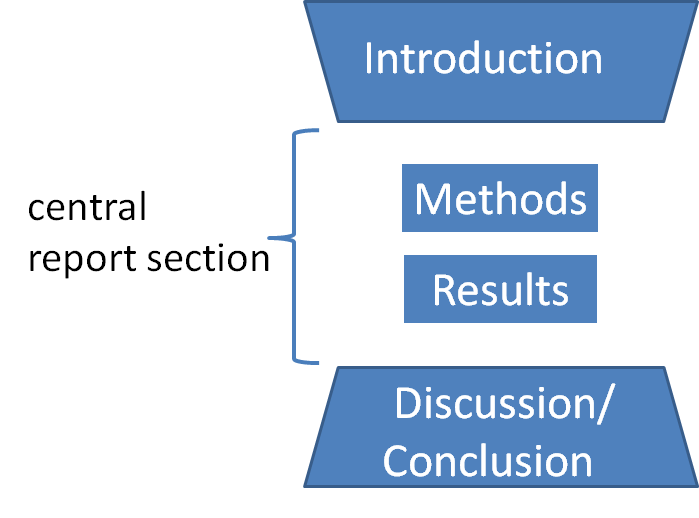
Fig.1: Wineglass model for IMRaD structure. The above scheme shows how to line up the information in IMRaD writing. It has two characteristics: the first is its top-bottom symmetric shape; the second is its change of width, meaning the top is wide, and it narrows towards the middle, and then widens again as it goes down toward the bottom. The first characteristic, the top-bottom symmetric shape, represents the symmetry of the story development. The second one, the change of width, represents the change in generality of the viewpoint.

Original research articles are typically structured in this basic order

- Introduction – Why was the study undertaken? What was the research question, the tested hypothesis or the purpose of the research?
- Methods – Who, When, where, and how was the study done? What materials were used or who was included in the study groups (patients, etc.)?
- Results – What answer was found to the research question; what did the study find? Was the tested hypothesis true?
- Discussion – What might the answer imply and why does it matter? How does it fit in with what other researchers have found? What are the perspectives for future research?

The plot and the flow of the story of the IMRaD style of writing are explained by a 'wine glass model' or hourglass model.

Writing, compliant with IMRaD format (IMRaD writing) typically first presents "(a) the subject that positions the study from the wide perspective", "(b) outline of the study", develops through "(c) study method", and "(d) the results", and concludes with "(e) outline and conclusion of the fruit of each topics", and "(f) the meaning of the study from the wide and general point of view". Here, (a) and (b) are mentioned in the section of the "Introduction", (c) and (d) are mentioned in the section of the "Method" and "Result" respectively, and (e) and (f) are mentioned in the section of the "Discussion" or "Conclusion".

In this sense, to explain how to line up the information in IMRaD writing, the 'wine glass model' (see the pattern diagram shown in Fig.1) will be helpful (see pp 2–3 of the Hilary Glasman-deal). As mentioned in abovementioned textbook, the scheme of 'wine glass model' has two characteristics. The first one is "top-bottom symmetric shape", and the second one is "changing width" i.e. "the top is wide and it narrows towards the middle, and then widens again as it goes down toward the bottom".

The First one, "top-bottom symmetric shape", represents the symmetry of the story development. Note the shape of the top trapezoid (representing the structure of Introduction) and the shape of the trapezoid at the bottom are reversed. This is expressing that the same subject introduced in Introduction will be taken up again in suitable formation for the section of Discussion/Conclusion in these section in the reversed order. (See the relationship between abovementioned (a), (b) and (e), (f).)

The Second one, "the change of the width" of the schema shown in Fig.1, represents the change of generality of the view point. As along the flow of the story development, when the viewpoints are more general, the width of the diagram is expressed wider, and when they are more specialized and focused, the width is expressed narrower.

=== As the standard format of academic journals ===
The IMRAD format has been adopted by a steadily increasing number of academic journals since the first half of the 20th century. The IMRAD structure has come to dominate academic writing in the sciences, most notably in empirical biomedicine. The structure of most public health journal articles reflects this trend. Although the IMRAD structure originates in the empirical sciences, it now also regularly appears in academic journals across a wide range of disciplines. Many scientific journals now not only prefer this structure but also use the IMRAD acronym as an instructional device in the instructions to their authors, recommending the use of the four terms as main headings. For example, it is explicitly recommended in the "Uniform Requirements for Manuscripts Submitted to Biomedical Journals" issued by the International Committee of Medical Journal Editors (previously called the Vancouver guidelines):

The text of observational and experimental articles is usually (but not necessarily) divided into the following sections: Introduction, Methods, Results, and Discussion. This so-called "IMRAD" structure is not an arbitrary publication format but rather a direct reflection of the process of scientific discovery. Long articles may need subheadings within some sections (especially Results and Discussion) to clarify their content. Other types of articles, such as case reports, reviews, and editorials, probably need to be formatted differently.

The IMRAD structure is also recommended for empirical studies in the 6th edition of the publication manual of the American Psychological Association (APA style). The APA publication manual is widely used by journals in the social, educational and behavioral sciences.

== Benefits ==
The IMRAD structure has proved successful because it facilitates literature review, allowing readers to navigate articles more quickly to locate material relevant to their purpose. But the neat order of IMRAD rarely corresponds to the actual sequence of events or ideas of the research presented; the IMRAD structure effectively supports a reordering that eliminates unnecessary detail, and allows the reader to assess a well-ordered and noise-free presentation of the relevant and significant information. It allows the most relevant information to be presented clearly and logically to the readership, by summarizing the research process in an ideal sequence and without unnecessary detail.

== Caveats ==
The idealised sequence of the IMRAD structure has on occasion been criticised for being too rigid and simplistic. In a radio talk in 1964 the Nobel laureate Peter Medawar criticised this text structure for not giving a realistic representation of the thought processes of the writing scientist: "… the scientific paper may be a fraud because it misrepresents the processes of thought that accompanied or gave rise to the work that is described in the paper". Medawar's criticism was discussed at the XIXth General Assembly of the World Medical Association in 1965. While respondents may argue that it is too much to ask from such a simple instructional device to carry the burden of representing the entire process of scientific discovery, Medawar's caveat expressed his belief that many students and faculty throughout academia treat the structure as a simple panacea. Medawar and others have given testimony both to the importance and to the limitations of the device.

== Abstract considerations ==
In addition to the scientific article itself, a brief abstract is usually required for publication. The abstract should, however, be composed to function as an autonomous text, even if some authors and readers may think of it as an almost integral part of the article. The increasing importance of well-formed autonomous abstracts may well be a consequence of the increasing use of searchable digital abstract archives, where a well-formed abstract will dramatically increase the probability for an article to be found by its optimal readership. Consequently, there is a strong recent trend toward developing formal requirements for abstracts, most often structured on the IMRAD pattern, and often with strict additional specifications of topical content items that should be considered for inclusion in the abstract. Such abstracts are often referred to as structured abstracts. The growing importance of abstracts in the era of computerized literature search and information overload has led some users to modify the IMRAD acronym to AIMRAD, in order to give due emphasis to the abstract.

== Heading style variations ==
Usually, the IMRAD article sections use the IMRAD words as headings. A few variations can occur, as follows:

- Many journals have a convention of omitting the "Introduction" heading, based on the idea that the reader who begins reading an article does not need to be told that the beginning of the text is the introduction. This print-era proscription is fading since the advent of the Web era, when having an explicit "Introduction" heading helps with navigation via document maps and collapsible/expandable TOC trees. (The same considerations are true regarding the presence or proscription of an explicit "Abstract" heading.)
- In some journals, the "Methods" heading may vary, being "Methods and materials", "Materials and methods", or similar phrases. Some journals mandate that exactly the same wording for this heading be used for all articles without exception; other journals reasonably accept whatever each submitted manuscript contains, as long as it is one of these sensible variants.
- The "Discussion" section may subsume any "Summary", "Conclusion", or "Conclusions" section, in which case there may or may not be any explicit "Summary", "Conclusion", or "Conclusions" subheading; or the "Summary"/"Conclusion"/"Conclusions" section may be a separate section, using an explicit heading on the same heading hierarchy level as the "Discussion" heading. Which of these variants to use as the default is a matter of each journal's chosen style, as is the question of whether the default style must be forced onto every article or whether sensible inter-article flexibility will be allowed. The journals which use the "Conclusion" or "Conclusions" along with a statement about the "Aim" or "Objective" of the study in the "Introduction" is following the newly proposed acronym "IaMRDC" which stands for "Introduction with aim, Materials and Methods, Results, Discussion, and Conclusion."

== Other elements that are typical although not part of the acronym ==
- Disclosure statements (see main article at conflicts of interest in academic publishing)
  - Reader's theme that is the point of this element's existence: "Why should I (the reader) trust or believe what you (the author) say? Are you just making money off of saying it?"
  - Appear either in opening footnotes or a section of the article body
  - Subtypes of disclosure:
    - Disclosure of funding (grants to the project)
    - Disclosure of conflict of interest (grants to individuals, jobs/salaries, stock or stock options)
- Clinical relevance statement
  - Reader's theme that is the point of this element's existence: "Why should I (the reader) spend my time reading what you say? How is it relevant to my clinical practice? Basic research is nice, other people's cases are nice, but my time is triaged, so make your case for 'why bother'"
  - Appear either as a display element (sidebar) or a section of the article body
  - Format: short, a few sentences or bullet points
- Ethical compliance statement
  - Reader's theme that is the point of this element's existence: "Why should I believe that your study methods were ethical?"
  - "We complied with the Declaration of Helsinki."
  - "We got our study design approved by our local institutional review board before proceeding."
  - "We got our study design approved by our local ethics committee before proceeding."
  - "We treated our animals in accordance with our local Institutional Animal Care and Use Committee."
- Diversity, equity, and inclusion statement
  - Reader's theme that is the point of this element's existence: "Why should I believe that your study methods consciously included people?" (for example, avoided inadvertently underrepresenting some people—participants or researchers—by race, ethnicity, sex, gender, or other factors)
  - "We worked to ensure that people of color and transgender people were not underrepresented among the study population."
  - "One or more of the authors of this paper self-identifies as living with a disability."
  - "One or more of the authors of this paper self-identifies as transgender."

== Additional standardization (reporting guidelines) ==
In the late 20th century and early 21st, the scientific communities found that the communicative value of journal articles was still much less than it could be if best practices were developed, promoted, and enforced. Thus reporting guidelines (guidelines for how best to report information) arose. The general theme has been to create templates and checklists with the message to the user being, "your article is not complete until you have done all of these things." In the 1970s, the ICMJE (International Committee of Medical Journal Editors) released the Uniform Requirements for Manuscripts Submitted to Biomedical Journals (Uniform Requirements or URM). Other such standards, mostly developed in the 1990s through 2010s, are listed below. The academic medicine community is working hard on trying to raise compliance with good reporting standards, but there is still much to be done; for example, a 2016 review of instructions for authors in 27 emergency medicine journals found insufficient mention of reporting standards, and a 2018 study found that even when journals' instructions for authors mention reporting standards, there is a difference between a mention or badge and enforcing the requirements that the mention or badge represents.

Growing attention to data sharing practices has expanded these efforts beyond the journal article itself. From a rigorous evidence-based perspective, significant further work remains. FORCE11 is an international coalition that has been developing standards for sharing research data sets.

Most researchers cannot be familiar with all of the many reporting standards that now exist, but it is enough to know which ones must be followed in one's own work, and to know where to look for details when needed. Several organizations provide help with this task of checking one's own compliance with the latest standards:

- The EQUATOR Network
- The BioSharing collaboration (biosharing.org)

Several important webpages on this topic are:

- NLM's list at Research Reporting Guidelines and Initiatives: By Organization
- The EQUATOR Network's list at Reporting guidelines and journals: fact & fiction
- TRANSPOSE (Transparency in Scholarly Publishing for Open Scholarship Evolution), "a grassroots initiative to build a crowdsourced database of journal policies," allowing faster and easier lookup and comparison, and potentially spurring harmonization

Relatedly, SHERPA provides compliance-checking tools, and AllTrials provides a rallying point, for efforts to enforce openness and completeness of clinical trial reporting. These efforts stand against publication bias and against excessive corporate influence on scientific integrity.

Reporting standards in the scientific literature
Short name	Longer name	Best link	Organization that fostered it	Goals/Notes
AMSTAR	(A Measurement Tool to Assess Systematic Reviews)	amstar.ca	AMSTAR team	Provides a tool to test the quality of systematic reviews
ARRIVE	(Animal Research: Reporting of In Vivo Experiments)	www.nc3rs.org.uk/arrive-guidelines	NC3Rs	Seeks to improve the reporting of research using animals (maximizing information published and minimizing unnecessary studies)
CARE	(Consensus-based Clinical Case Reporting Guideline Development)	www.equator-network.org/reporting-guidelines/care	CARE Group	Seeks completeness, transparency, and data analysis in case reports and data from the point of care
CHEERS	(Consolidated Health Economic Evaluation Reporting Standards)	www.ispor.org/Health-Economic-Evaluation-Publication-CHEERS-Guidelines.asp	ISPOR	Seeks value in health care
CONSORT	(Consolidated Standards of Reporting Trials)	www.consort-statement.org	CONSORT Group	Provides a minimum set of recommendations for reporting randomized trials
COREQ	(Consolidated Criteria for Reporting Qualitative Research)	www.equator-network.org/reporting-guidelines/coreq/	University of Sydney	Seeks quality in reporting of qualitative research by providing a 32-item checklist for interviews and focus groups
EASE guidelines	(EASE Guidelines for Authors and Translators of Scientific Articles to be Published in English	www.ease.org.uk/publications/author-guidelines-authors-and-translators/	EASE	Seeks quality reporting of all scientific literature
Empirical Standards	ACM SIGSOFT Empirical Standards for Software Engineering Research	https://acmsigsoft.github.io/EmpiricalStandards/	ACM SIGSOFT	Provides methodology-specific research and reporting guidelines, checklists and reviewing systems
ENTREQ	(Enhancing Transparency in Reporting the Synthesis of Qualitative Research)	www.equator-network.org/reporting-guidelines/entreq/	Various universities	Provides a framework for reporting the synthesis of qualitative health research
FAIR	(findability, accessibility, interoperability, and reusability)	doi.org/10.1038/sdata.2016.18	Various organizations	High-level goals, allowing for various ways to achieve them; specifies "what" is wanted and "why", allowing the "how" to be determined by the researcher
ICMJE	(Recommendations for the Conduct, Reporting, Editing, and Publication of Scholarly Work in Medical Journals; formerly known as the Uniform Requirements for Manuscripts Submitted to Biomedical Journals)	www.icmje.org/recommendations	ICMJE	Seeks quality in medical journal articles
JARS	Journal Article Reporting Standards	www.apastyle.org/manual/related/JARS-MARS.pdf	American Psychological Association	Seeks quality in psychological research reporting; published in the appendix of the APA Publication Manual
MARS	Meta-Analysis Reporting Standards	www.apastyle.org/manual/related/JARS-MARS.pdf	American Psychological Association	Seeks quality in psychological research reporting; published in the appendix of the APA Publication Manual
MI	Minimum Information standards	biosharing.org	Various organizations	A family of standards for bioscience reporting, developed by the various relevant specialty organizations and collated by the BioSharing portal (biosharing.org) (formerly collated by the MIBBI portal [Minimum Information about a Biomedical or Biological Investigation])
MOOSE	(Meta-analysis Of Observational Studies in Epidemiology)	jamanetwork.com/journals/jama/article-abstract/192614	MOOSE group (various organizations)	Seeks quality in meta-analysis of observational studies in epidemiology
NOS	(Newcastle–Ottawa scale)	http://www.ohri.ca/programs/clinical_epidemiology/oxford.asp	University of Newcastle, Australia and University of Ottawa	Assesses quality of nonrandomized studies included in a systematic review and/or meta-analysis
PRISMA	(Preferred Reporting Items for Systematic Reviews and Meta-Analyses)	www.prisma-statement.org	PRSIMA group	Seeks quality in systematic reviews and meta-analyses, especially in the medical literature, but applicable to most scientific literature; PRISMA supersedes QUOROM
REMARK	(Reporting Recommendations for Tumor Marker Prognostic Studies)	doi.org/10.1093/jnci/dji237	NCI and EORTC	Seeks quality in reporting of tumor marker research
RR	(registered reports)	cos.io/rr	Center for Open Science	Applies the principles of preregistration with the aim to improve both the quality of science being done and the quality of its reporting in journals. Aims to improve the incentivization of scientists by removing perverse incentives that encourage publication bias and inappropriate/excessive forms of post hoc analysis; it involves two peer review steps: one before results reporting (to review methodology alone) and another after results reporting.
SAMPL	(Statistical Analyses and Methods in the Published Literature)	www.equator-network.org/wp-content/uploads/2013/03/SAMPL-Guidelines-3-13-13.pdf	Centre for Statistics in Medicine at Oxford University	Seeks quality in statistics in the biomedical literature
SPIRIT	(Standard Protocol Items: Recommendations for Interventional Trials)	www.spirit-statement.org	SPIRIT Group (various organizations)	Seeks quality in clinical trial protocols by defining an evidence-based set of items to address in every protocol
SQUIRE	(Standards for Quality Improvement Reporting Excellence)	www.squire-statement.org	SQUIRE team (various organizations)	Provides a framework for reporting new knowledge about how to improve healthcare; intended for reports that describe system level work to improve the health care quality, patient safety, and value in health care
SRQR	(Standards for Reporting Qualitative Research: A Synthesis of Recommendations)	doi.org/10.1097/ACM.0000000000000388	Various medical schools	Provides standards for reporting qualitative research
STAR	Structured, Transparent, Accessible Reporting	www.cell.com/star-authors-guide	Cell Press	Improved reporting of methods to aid reproducibility and researcher workflow
STARD	(Standards for the Reporting of Diagnostic Accuracy Studies)	www.stard-statement.org	STARD Group (various organizations)	Diagnostic accuracy
STROBE	(Strengthening the Reporting of Observational Studies in Epidemiology)	www.strobe-statement.org	STROBE Group (various organizations)	Seeks quality in reporting of observational studies in epidemiology
TOP	(Transparency and Openness Promotion)	cos.io/top/	(Center for Open Science)	Codifies 8 modular standards, for each of which a journal's editorial policy can pledge to meet a certain level of stringency (Disclose, Require, or Verify)
TREND	(Transparent Reporting of Evaluations with Nonrandomized Designs)	www.cdc.gov/trendstatement	TREND Group (various organizations)	Seeks to improve the reporting standards of nonrandomized evaluations of behavioral and public health interventions
TRIPOD	(Transparent Reporting of a Multivariable Prediction Model for Individual Prognosis or Diagnosis)	doi.org/10.7326/M14-0697	Centre for Statistics in Medicine (Oxford University) and Julius Center for Health Sciences and Primary Care (University Medical Center Utrecht)	Provides a set of recommendations for the reporting of studies developing, validating, or updating a prediction model, whether for diagnostic or prognostic purposes
URM / ICMJE	(Recommendations for the Conduct, Reporting, Editing, and Publication of Scholarly Work in Medical Journals; formerly known as the Uniform Requirements for Manuscripts Submitted to Biomedical Journals)	www.icmje.org/recommendations	ICMJE	Seeks quality in medical journal articles

== See also ==
- Case report
- Case series
- Eight-legged essay
- Five paragraph essay
- IRAC
- Journal Article Tag Suite (JATS)
- Literature review
- Meta-analyses
- Schaffer paragraph
