= Five-paragraph essay =

Format of essay

The five-paragraph essay is a common essay format that comprises an introductory with a thesis, three body paragraphs that develop supporting points, and a conclusion. The format is widely taught in U.S. secondary education and is sometimes referred to as a "hamburger essay" in K–12 contexts that use a layered graphic organizer for paragraphs and essays.

Scholars have linked the form to earlier traditions of theme‑writing in current‑traditional rhetoric, and debate continues to this day over its educational value.

== Form ==
The five-paragraph essay is a structured form of essay writing that consists of five distinct paragraphs:

- Introduction (one paragraph)
- Body paragraphs (three paragraphs)
- Conclusion (one paragraph)

=== Structure ===
The layout of the five-paragraph essay mimics an "hourglass". It goes from the most general information, to detailed, and back to general.

The introductory paragraph serves to present the main idea of the essay and introduce the thesis statement. It often begins with a narrative hook to capture the reader's interest, followed by a sentence that provides a general theme and another that narrows the focus. If the essay is based on a literary text, a sentence referencing the work and its author may be included (e.g., "In the book Night, Elie Wiesel states..."). The introduction typically concludes with the thesis statement, which outlines the central argument of the essay. Additionally, an organizational sentence may be included to indicate the structure and sequence of the body paragraphs.

The three body paragraphs each present supporting evidence or arguments that reinforce the thesis statement. Each paragraph generally begins with a topic sentence, followed by analysis and examples that substantiate the argument.

The concluding paragraph summarizes the main points of the essay and restates the thesis in a broader context. It often provides a final perspective on the topic and reinforces the significance of the argument. For example, in an essay on sports, a conclusion might state: "Sports offer numerous benefits for youth, including improved physical health, better circulation, and enhanced stamina. Additionally, they contribute to the development of social and organizational skills, which are valuable in both personal and professional life."

== History ==
Composition scholars trace the modern five‑paragraph essay to nineteenth‑ and twentieth‑century “theme‑writing” associated with current‑traditional rhetoric. However, there is no physical documentation of this because it was during a silent period. This lineage emphasized fixed forms and correctness over invention and situation‑specific choices.

== Pedagogical debate ==
Five-paragraph essays are widely used as the first type of essay in secondary school; nonetheless, they have received criticism. It is argued that such a format may be rather limited, thereby hindering the development of more sophisticated skills. According to Thomas E. Nunnally and Kimberly Wesley, most teachers and professors consider the five-paragraph form ultimately restricting for fully developing an idea. Wesley argues that the form is never appropriate. Nunnally states that the form can be good for developing analytical skills that should then be expanded. Similarly, American educator David F. Labaree claims that "The Rule of Five" is "dysfunctional... off-putting, infantilising and intellectually arid" because demands for the essay's form often obscure its meaning and, therefore, largely automatize creating and reading five-paragraph essays. Nancy Flanagan discusses how the five-paragraph essay format is a great tool for introductory writing. However, it can become a problem when students have a closed-minded attitude about this layout. The five-paragraph essay format has been criticized for its rigid structure, which some educators believe stifles creativity and critical thinking. Critics argue that it promotes a formulaic approach to writing, which can limit students' ability to express more complex ideas and develop their unique writing style.

It has been said that the format embodies a "deficit model" of teaching, suggesting that learners need the constraints of certain rules to write proficiently. The critics maintain that while focusing on formal aspects and rules, one risks overlooking more important concerns, such as creativity and critical thinking. Consequently, there appears to be little room left for learners' individual development.

Yet another critique of the genre is that it is, as some academics call it, a "mutt genre," implying that it lives in academia and cannot be used in any other setting. In contrast to real-life writing, where a writer must adapt to the particular audience and occasion, the five-paragraph format prescribes a single format regardless of circumstances. This means that students will not be able to use their writing skills learned in one genre in other writing occasions.

Studies on writing development during secondary-postsecondary transition indicate that students whose writing is restricted by this format might have problems with free writing. The prescribed format can lead to the oversimplification of the topic and the over-shortening of the number of points presented in the piece. This leads to a situation in which a writer can organize information but not analyze it.

The impact of a rigid structure of writing has also attracted attention among scholars. If one teaches writing based on very strict rules, it can cause writer's block or writing anxiety because ideas, which cannot be presented using such rules, are difficult to incorporate into written work. Heuristic models of writing have been suggested as possible replacements for the traditional approach.

The use of five-paragraph essays in academic practice has been explained through many institutional factors. For example, large numbers of students who are taught at the same time and standardized testing practices contributed to the popularity of this type of writing assignment. Its formulaic structure facilitates the assessment process. Nevertheless, it is believed that such an emphasis on efficiency can undermine the communicative function of writing.

== See also ==
- De Inventione
- Eight-legged essay
- Rhetorica ad Herennium (c. 90 BC)
- Schaffer paragraph
- IMRAD
- IRAC
- Multigenre research paper
- Explication de Texte
