= Opening statement =

Beginning statement in a court case

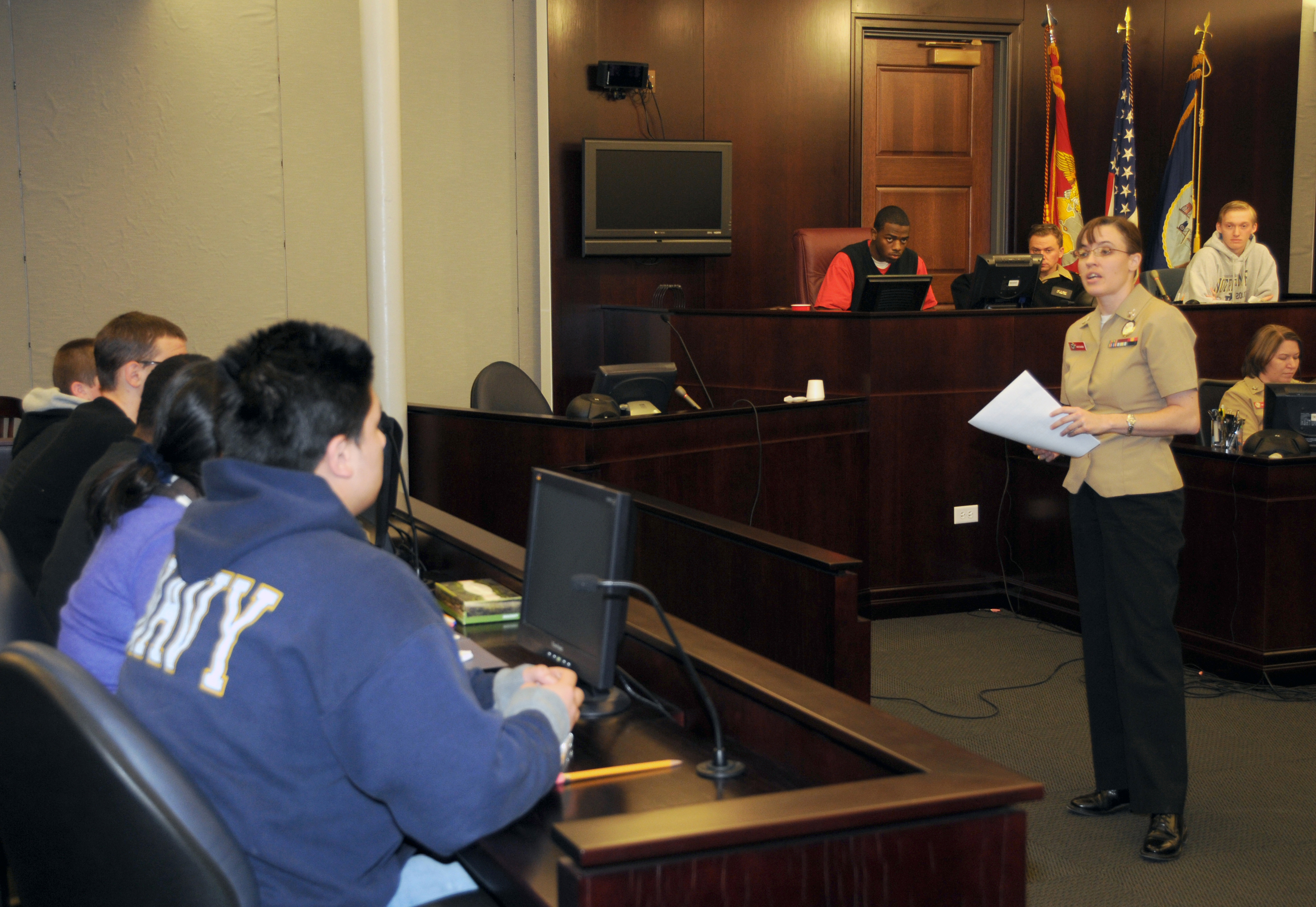
A legalman making an opening statement for the prosecution to a jury during a mock trial.

An opening statement is generally the first occasion that the trier of fact (jury or judge) has to hear from a lawyer in a trial, aside possibly from questioning during voir dire. The opening statement is generally constructed to serve as a "road map" for the fact-finder. This is especially essential, in many jury trials, since jurors (at least theoretically) know nothing at all about the case before the trial, (or if they do, they are strictly instructed by the judge to put preconceived notions aside). Though such statements may be dramatic and vivid, they must be limited to the evidence reasonably expected to be presented during the trial. Attorneys generally conclude opening statements with a reminder that at the conclusion of evidence, the attorney will return to ask the fact-finder to find in their client's favor.

Opening statements are, in theory, not allowed to be argumentative, or suggest the inferences that fact-finders should draw from the evidence they will hear. In actual practice, the line between statement and argument is often unclear and many attorneys will infuse at least a little argumentation into their opening (often prefacing borderline arguments with some variation on the phrase, "As we will show you..."). Objections, though permissible during opening statements, are very unusual, and by professional courtesy are usually reserved only for egregious conduct.

Generally, the prosecution in a criminal case and plaintiff in a civil case is the first to offer an opening statement, and defendants go second. Defendants are also allowed the option of delaying their opening statement until after the close of the prosecution or plaintiff's case. Few take this option, however, so as not to allow the other party's argument to stand uncontradicted for so long.

The techniques of opening statements are taught in courses on trial advocacy. The opening statement is integrated with the overall case strategy through either a theme and theory or, with more advanced strategies, a line of effort. Specific tactics that can be incorporated in an opening statement are audio-visual elements, a clear overview of the coming presentation, and using deposition testimony to highlight key information they can expect of upcoming witnesses.

== See also ==
- Closing argument
