= Kishōtenketsu =

Asian narrative technique

Chinese name
- Traditional Chinese: 起承轉合
- Simplified Chinese: 起承转合
Transcriptions
Standard Mandarin
- Hanyu Pinyin: qǐchéngzhuǎnhé
Wu
- Wugniu: chi^{3} zen^{2} tsoe^{3} gheq^{8}
Yue: Cantonese
- Jyutping: hei^{2} sing^{4} zyun^{2} hap^{6}
Southern Min
- Hokkien POJ: khí-sêng-choán-ha̍p

Vietnamese name
- Vietnamese alphabet: khởi thừa chuyển hợp khai thừa chuyển hợp
- Chữ Hán: 起承轉合 開承轉合

Korean name
- Hangul: 기승전결
- Hanja: 起承轉結
Transcriptions
- Revised Romanization: giseungjeongyeol

Japanese name
- Kanji: 起承転結
- Kana: きしょうてんけつ
Transcriptions
- Romanization: kishōtenketsu

Kishōtenketsu (起承転結) describes the four-part structure of many classic Chinese, Korean, Japanese and Vietnamese narratives. The parts can be summarized as: introduction, development, twist or reversal, and resolution.

Kishōtenketsu as a narrative structure does not center on conflict as part of its structure, especially when compared to common Western narrative structures like the three-act structure and Joseph Campbell's "Hero's Journey." This has led to the structure being popularly described as "without conflict," although narratives created using kishōtenketsu, such as the 2019 South Korean film Parasite, can and often do contain conflict.

Kishōtenketsu also is not symmetrical in structure in that it deliberately holds back a major story element until the third of four acts, which often changes the genre of the story.

== History ==
In China, this technique is called qǐchéngzhuǎnhé (起承轉合). It was used in Chinese poetry in styles of four-line composition, such as Qijue. Qichengzhuanhe has been speculated to have originated with Li Bai during the Tang dynasty, but this would predate the time period from the first mention of this form. This view is backed by Wu Yingtian who cites a four-structure poetry type which included chin (hanbi), neck (Jingbi), belly (fubi) and behind (houbi) attributing it to Yang Zai. It was, however, described by Fan Heng (1272–1330) as methods of writing poetry, divided into four styles: qi, cheng, zhuan, and he. Qi was described as straight, cheng was likened to a mortar, zhuan was described change, and he is likened to a deep pond or overflowing river which helps one reflect on the meaning. The rhetorical style started out as poetry. This later influenced pianwen and guwento and eventually created the baguwen aka the eight-legged essay.

In Korea, the form was called giseungjeongyeol (Hangul: 기승전결; Hanja: 起承轉結). In Japan, it is called kishōtenketsu (起承転結), from which the English word derives. In Vietnam, it is called khai - thừa - chuyển - hợp (Chữ Hán: 開承轉合).

Back in China, after the baguwen lost favor with the fall of the Qing dynasty, and due to its difficulty, a revival of the qichengzhuanhe form came back in popular education, relabeled as kaiduan-fazhan-gaochao-jieju (beginning, development, climax, conclusion). Contrary to thought, the structure is not the same as the popular US and European-derived three-act structure. For example, transitions can be anything from a sentence to a full paragraph which contrasts with the five-paragraph essay where one sentence is encouraged for all transitions, rather than a full paragraph. A writer could also can set up a callback to the beginning of the essay. The conclusion is said to need to be quick and one should not linger long on that part of the essay.

This form also was often used in both classical literature and contemporary plays such as Waves Washing the Sand.

== Regional variations ==
Variations of this dramatic structure are based on region due to differences in how the Chinese characters are interpreted per the country and culture.

=== Chinese ===
1. 起 qǐ: start or introduction, usually meaning the reason a thing begins
2. 承 chéng: handling, process, or hardships
3. 轉 zhuǎn: turn, turning point, crescendo
4. 合 hé: result.

Examples
Original Chinese	English Translation
送 別 王 維 山 中 相 送 罷 ， 日 暮 掩 柴 扉 。 春 草 明 年 綠 ， 王 孫 歸 不 歸 。	Farewell by Wang Wei (699–759) qi: After a farewell in the mountain, cheng: Dusk falls, and I shut my firewood-made gate. zhuan: When the spring grass is green next year, he: I wonder if my friend will return.

=== Korean ===
1. 기: raising issues and introducing characters
2. 승: the beginning of the action (but not to solve a problem, necessarily, but usually for self-realization)
3. 전: a reversal or change in direction
4. 결: the matter is concluded and any lessons are gained through the process or results

Examples
Original Korean	English Translation
정지상의 송인(送人) 기구 雨歇長堤草色多 비 갠 긴 강둑에 풀빛 파릇한데, 승구 送君南浦動悲歌 남포에서 임 보내며 구슬픈 노래 부르네. 전구 大同江水何時盡 대동강의 물은 언제 마르리오? 결구 別淚年年添綠波 이별 눈물이 해마다 푸른 물결에 보태지네.	Escort by Jeong Ji Sang Gi Multicolored green grass on the banks of a long river. Seung He's singing a sad song in Nampo. Jeon When is the water of Daedong dry? Gyeol Every year, farewell tears add to the blue waves.
황조가 고구려 유리왕 起句 翩翩黃鳥 펄펄 나는 저 꾀꼬리 承句 雌雄相依 암수 서로 정답구나. 轉句 念我之獨 외로워라 이 내 몸은 結句 誰其與歸 뉘와 함께 돌아갈고.	Hwangjo (Yellow Tide) By King Yuri of Goguryeo Gi Fluttering Yellow Birds Seung male and female depend on each other Jeon Lonesome self Gyeol Who will go home with me?

=== Japanese ===
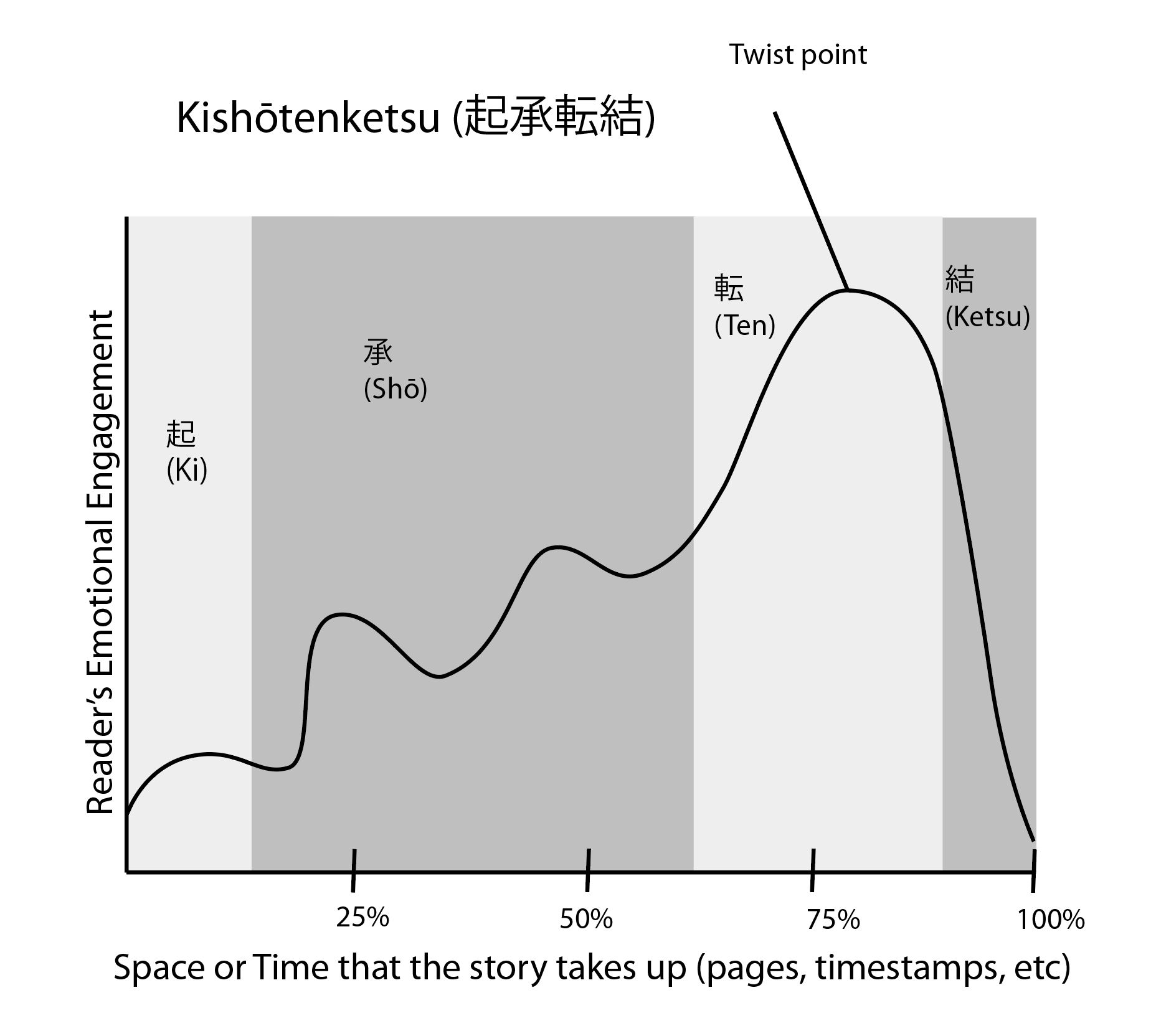
The height of the bumps leading to the twist can change per story.

1. kiku (起句) is 'ki (起)': introduction, where 起 can mean rouse, wake up, get up
2. shōku (承句) is 'sho (承)': development, where 承 can also mean acquiesce, hear, listen to, be informed, receive
3. tenku (転句) is 'ten (転)': twist, where 転 can mean revolve, turn around, change
4. kekku (結句) is 'ketsu (結)': conclusion, though 結 can also mean result, consequence, outcome, effect, coming to fruition, bearing fruit, etc.

In a story, the following might happen:

1. Introduction (ki): an introduction to the characters, era, and other information required to understand the plot.
2. Development (shō): follows leads towards the twist in the story. No major changes so far.
3. Twist (ten): the story turns toward an unexpected development. This is the crux of the story, the yama (ヤマ) or climax. If the narrative takes several turns, this is the biggest one.
4. Conclusion (ketsu), also called ochi (落ち) or ending, wraps up the story.

The same pattern is used for arguments. For example, a discussion about the usage of photocopying machines could be analyzed as follows:

- Introduction (ki): Once, it was mandatory to copy information by hand. Mistakes were made that way.
- Development (shō): The invention of copying machines made it possible to make copies more quickly and accurately.
- Twist (ten): In a similar way, cars facilitate saving time when traveling, with the drawback of not being able to take in the local beauty. On the other hand, walking makes it easier to appreciate nature.
- Conclusion (ketsu): Although photocopying is easier, copying by hand can sometimes be better when it aids in retaining the information to use it later.

This structure can be used in yonkoma manga, and even for documents, dissertations, and music. Kishōtenketsu can also apply to sentences, chapters, and even clauses.

Examples
Original Japanese	English Translation
頼山陽 大阪本町糸屋の娘 姉は十六妹は十四 諸国大名は弓矢で殺す 糸屋の娘は眼で殺す	Sanyō Rai Ki Daughters of Itoya, in the Honmachi of Osaka. Shō The elder daughter is sixteen and the younger one is fourteen. Ten Throughout history, daimyō killed the enemy with bows and arrows. Ketsu The daughters of Itoya kill with their eyes.

The concept has also been used in game design, particularly in Nintendo's video games, most notably Super Mario games such as Super Mario Galaxy (2007) and Super Mario 3D World (2013); their designers Shigeru Miyamoto and Koichi Hayashida are known to utilize this concept for their game designs.

=== Vietnamese ===
In Vietnamese, khởi - thừa - chuyển - hợp or khai- thừa - chuyển - hợp (chữ Hán: 起承轉合; 開承轉合) is usually associated with tứ tuyệt poems.

1. 起/開 khởi/khai (line 1): introduce the idea of the poem
2. 承 thừa (line 2): often expands the idea and emotional flow which were introduced
3. 轉 chuyển (line 3): turn, turning point, crescendo
4. 合 hợp (line 4): concludes the idea of the whole poem

==== Examples ====
Chữ Nôm	Vietnamese alphabet	English translation	Structure
𠶆咹𦺓 菓槔儒𡮈𠰘𦺓灰、 尼𧵑春香買𪭱耒。 固沛緣饒辰𧺀吏、 停撑如蘿泊如𪿙。	Mời ăn trầu Quả cau nho nhỏ miếng trầu hôi, Này của Xuân Hương mới quệt rồi. Có phải duyên nhau thời thắm lại, Đừng xanh như lá bạc như vôi.	Invitation to eat Betel; A small betel nut, a fragrant quid of betel here, This is Xuân Hương’s, freshly prepared with care. If fate binds us, let love bloom bright and true, Not fade like lime, nor wilt as young leaves do.	Khởi: Introduces the betel nut and the betel quid. Thừa: Introduces the person preparing the betel quid (Xuân Hương). Chuyển: Inquires about the intentions or feelings of the person being offered the betel. Hợp: Expresses the emotions of the one offering the betel, concluding the poem.

Chữ Nôm	Vietnamese alphabet	English translation	Structure
𣘃甘棠 体俸甘棠汝召公、 坦餘移特伴共椿。 筆踈㐌劄香群变、 吟議𱜢埃拯動𢚸。	Cây cam đường Thấy bóng cam đường nhớ Thiệu Công, Đất dư xảy được bạn cùng thông. Bút thơ đã chép hương còn bén, Ngâm ngợi nào ai chẳng động lòng.	The Pear Tree; Seeing the pear tree’s shadow, I recall Thiệu Công (Duke of Shao), A land of surplus, by chance, gained a friend firm as a pine. Ink and verse already recorded the fragrance of that time, Who could ponder this and not feel stirred to song?	Khởi: Introduces the central image (the pear tree) and evokes memory of Thiệu Công. Thừa: Expands the scene; a friend firm as a pine contrasts with the land of surplus. Chuyển: Shifts focus from nature to art and legacy. Hợp: Resolves the poem by inviting reflection.

== English language resources ==
Taiwanese-American speculative fiction author and writing instructor Henry Lien has written and lectured extensively about kishōtenketsu, including in his book Spring, Summer, Asteroid, Bird: The Art of Eastern Storytelling, published by W.W. Norton, and in essays for Literary Hub, Poets & Writers, and Next Big Idea Club.

== Scientific study ==
In a study of this story structure in Taiwanese students versus a five-paragraph essay, researchers found that the students familiar with this structure were better able to pick out the main points of the essay, and the inverse was also true. US students could better pick out the main points of the essay when it was restructured to a five-paragraph essay, but not in qichengzhuanhe form. They hypothesized that the structure of the essay also organizes cognitive thought.

== See also ==
- Story structure
- Contrastive rhetoric
- Cross-cultural communication
- Jo-ha-kyū, contrasting 3-part structure
- Writing
- Yonkoma
