= Apodemica =

Ars Apodemica is travel advice literature which was significant in the period between the mid-16th and the late 18th century.

Travelling was becoming more and more a widespread practice, so the need was felt of guidance for future travellers. Ars Apodemica writings also gave guidelines on how to systematise the knowledge acquired by travelling, in order to benefit the learned community (the Respublica Literarum). These writings (several hundred in number) can be read as milestones in the formation of modern scientific methodology, but also as discourses on social practices of the period (e.g. the Grand Tour).
