= Microtheme =

Short essay

In education, a microtheme is a very short essay. For example, it may be 100-500 words in length or required to fit on a 5-by-8-inch (130 by 200 mm) index card. Often an exercise unto itself, microthemes can be used in writing courses to incrementally build up toward a larger paper. Microthemes allow for quick grading, such as A+/A/A-. Writing skill can be improved by writing often and in this case, by practicing writing the same thing in different ways and with different combinations of words.
