= Topic sentence =

Expository writing concept

In expository writing, a topic sentence is a sentence that summarizes the main idea of a paragraph. It is usually the first sentence in a paragraph.

A topic sentence should encapsulate or organize an entire paragraph. Although topic sentences may appear anywhere in a paragraph, in academic essays they often appear at the beginning. The topic sentence acts as a kind of summary, and offers the reader an insightful view of the paragraph's main ideas. More than being a mere summary of a paragraph, however, a topic sentence often provides a claim or an insight directly or indirectly related to the thesis. It adds cohesion to an academic text and helps organize ideas not only within the paragraph but also the piece of writing as a whole. As the topic sentence encapsulates the idea of the paragraph, serving as a sub-thesis, it remains general enough to cover the support given in the body paragraph while being more direct than the thesis of the paper.

== Forms ==
=== Complex sentences ===
A complex sentence is one that has a main clause which could stand alone and a dependent clause which cannot by itself be a sentence. Using a complex sentence is a way to refer to the content of the paragraph above (dependent clause) and then bring in the content of the new paragraph (the independent clause). Here is a typical example:

While the ant generally works for the benefit of the community, she also carries out duties for her own needs.

The beginning, dependent, clause probably refers to the content of a preceding paragraph that presented the ant as a community-focused worker. As suggested by the main clause, which is the second within the sentence, the new paragraph will address how the ant works to benefit herself as well.

=== Questions ===
Questions at the beginning of new paragraphs can make topic sentences which both remind the reader of what was in the previous paragraph and signal the introduction of something new. Consider this example of a question for a topic sentence:

But will the current budget cuts be enough to balance the school district’s budget?

This question refers to the content of the previous paragraph, but it introduces the content for the new one – how the budget cuts may not in fact be enough to balance the budget.

=== Bridge sentences ===
A "bridge sentence" reminds the reader of what went before and does not signal what is to come. It merely hints that something new is about to be introduced.

=== Pivots ===
Pivot topic sentences will come somewhere in the middle of a paragraph, and usually announce that the content will be changing in a different direction. These are often used when there are two differing opinions about something or when two "experts" are being quoted or referred to that may have a different opinion or approach to something. A paragraph may begin something like this:

Kubler and Kessler have identified 5 stages of grief – denial, anger, bargaining, depression and acceptance. And they have provided a detailed explanation of the symptoms and behaviors of each of these stages, so that those experiencing grief may identify which stage they are in at any given time and develop strategies with the help of their therapists, to move through those stages more effectively. Since their original work, however, a number of other psychologists have developed different models of the grieving process that call into question some of Kubler and Kessler’s contentions….

The first part of this paragraph addresses Kubler and Kessler; the second part will obviously address another opinion. The topic sentence is underlined to show the pivot point in the paragraph. Pivot topic sentences will always have some clue word, such as "yet," "sometimes," or "however."

== See also ==
- Essay
- Lead paragraph
- Thesis statement
