= Multigenre research paper =

Secondary education assignment

Multigenre research paper is an alternative to the traditional five-paragraph essay commonly used in secondary education. It emphasizes the use of multiple genres to represent a given or chosen research topic. A genre is a specific type of art including literature, speech, drawings, music, etc. With this type of project, students are expected to research their given topic and then present the information they gathered using a variety of genres, with an emphasis on writing and composition. The genres created to represent the topic can be put together through the creation of a theme and bracketed by an introduction and conclusion. This creates a unified research paper that avoids the structure of a traditional five paragraph essay.

== Benefits ==
While some educators may argue that certain genres are not scholarly and/or appropriate to the social studies classroom, the option of utilizing narrative thinking may give students, particularly those who have difficulty connecting with the material, a way to relate to the topic under consideration. Students will have more options in the ways they choose to think and write about a specific topic by having the opportunity to choose multiple genres to write in. The power to choose which genres they include in their papers, mainly based on the particular topic and writer preference, will also create a greater sense of ownership in the written product. In addition, allowing students to choose the genres that they include in their multigenre research papers will help them to recognize that each piece of writing has a specific purpose and audience.

According to Camille A. Allen, there are four main benefits for students who create a multigenre research paper:

1. Students become more interested in content: Method helps students remember the content because they become invested in it by focusing on areas of interest and connecting the material to their own interests and skills.
2. Students gain a new attitude toward learning: Students have the opportunity to make choices about topics and genres and how to present their material in a meaningful way. They are actively involved in the creation process, not simply given a topic and then passively write on it based on research. Students have the opportunity to take risks and be creatively in charge of their own learning.
3. Students build self-confidence: Students spend time evaluating themselves and their peers and see the value of bouncing their ideas off of others. They also take ownership of the multigenre paper they create and recognize the difficult process that both they and their peers went through in order to create such a paper.
4. Students learn to think: In order to be successful, students are required to communicate with their teacher and peers while composing a multigenre research paper. They get practice asking questions concerning how they will write and present their information.

Students also gain experience by discussing, with others, their possible genre ideas for their topic and work on editing their papers through peer revision.

According to Nancy Mack, other benefits to a multigenre research paper include:

- Requires that diverse types of writing be generated for a theme.
- Stimulates critical analysis and higher level thinking skills.
- Integrates factual information into a meaningful text versus copying or simple recall.
- Creates coherence among the parts of a problem to be solved.
- Requires a bibliography, footnotes, and careful documentation of sources.
- Permits the author to highlight personal interests and special expertise.
