= Wang Ao (Grand Secretary) =

Ming-era Chinese politician and poet

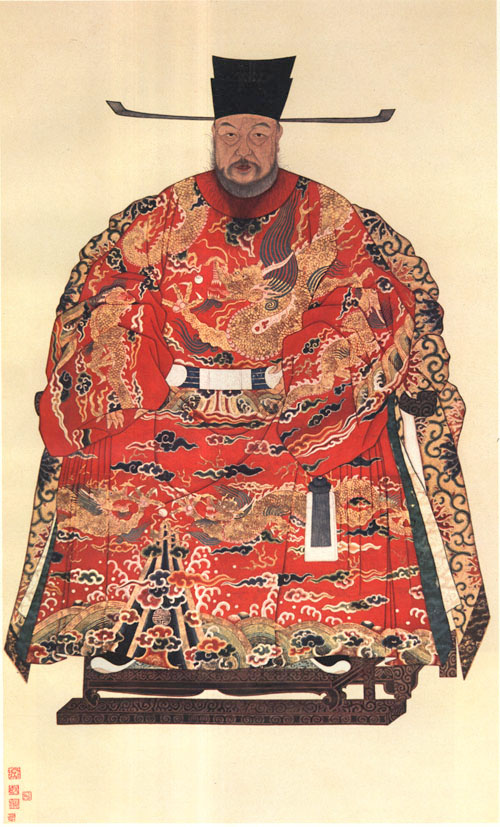
- Wang Ao wearing Mang Pao, (蟒袍, lit. "The Python Robe"), which could be worn only by the highest rank officials. The right to wear such dress was seen as a special honour that emperors bestowed on officials who had done great deeds for the empire. Ming dynasty era.

Senior Grand Secretary
- In office 1506–1509
- Monarch: Zhengde Emperor

Personal details
- Born: 17 August 1450 Suzhou, Ming Empire
- Died: 11 March 1524 (aged 73)
- Parents: Wang Wan (father); Lady Ye (mother)

Wang Ao
- Chinese: 王鏊
Transcriptions
Standard Mandarin
- Hanyu Pinyin: Wáng Ào

Wang Ao (1450 – 1524) was a politician, essayist and poet of the Ming dynasty. As a politician during the reign of the Zhengde Emperor, he held the position of Grand Secretary. Wang Ao was also an essayist who was considered a master on eight-legged essays.

== Life ==
Wang Ao was born in 1450 and originated from Suzhou, born into a clerical family. He studied Confucianism and passed the imperial examination. After he passed the imperial examinations, he served at Hanlin Academy.

In 1506, under the Zhengde Emperor, Wang was promoted to Grand Secretary. In 1509, Wang was recalled and retired in his native home Suzhou. Here, he wrote poetry and enjoyed great respect.

He died on 11 March 1524 at the age of 73.

== Names ==
Wang Ao held the courtesy name Jizhou traditional Chinese: 濟之; simplified Chinese: 济之; pinyin: Jizhou and the pseudonym name of Shouxi (simplified Chinese: 守溪; pinyin: Shǒuxī). After Wang Ao's death, the Jiajing Emperor gave him the pusthomous name of Wenke (simplified Chinese: 文恪; pinyin: Wénkè), which literally meant "Cultivated and Honest".

== Poems ==
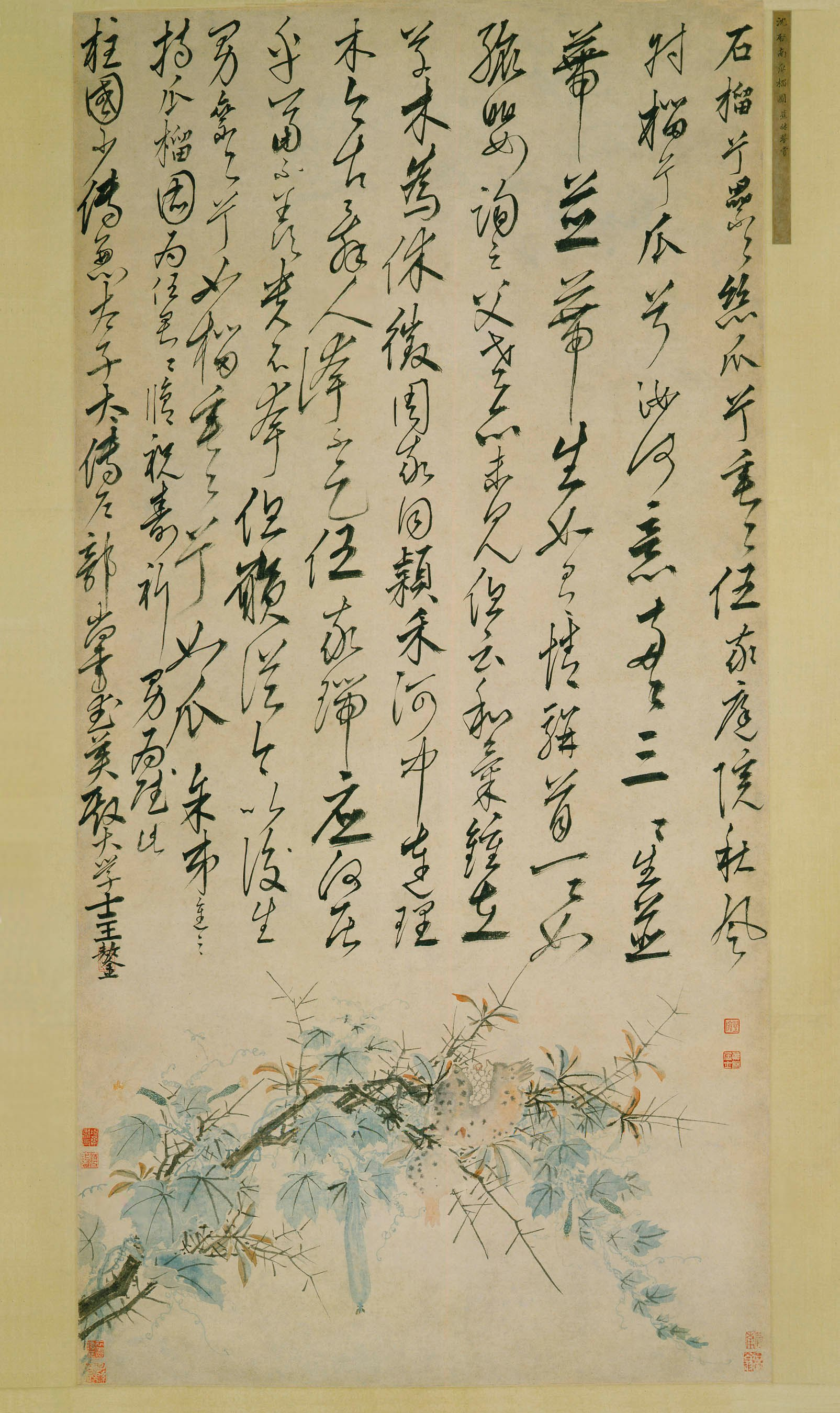
Ode to Pomegranate and Melon Vine, poen by Wang Ao, painting by Shen Zhou

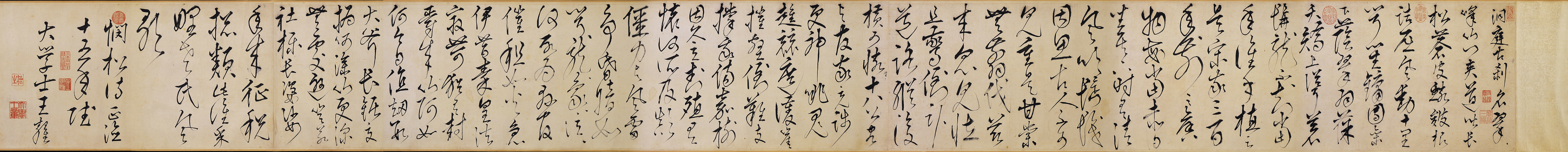
Poetry Grieving for a Pine, 1520

== Eight-legged essays ==
The following is a translation of an original eight-legged essay, written by Wang Ao.

Essay Topic:

"If the people enjoy sufficiency how could the ruler suffer from insufficiency?"

1. Pòtí:

When the people below are rich, the ruler at the top will naturally be rich.

2. Chéngtí:

This is so because the wealth of the ruler is something kept by the people. If the people are already rich, how can it stand to reason that the ruler alone is poor?

3. Qǐjiǎng:

You Ruo spoke from profundity the idea of the oneness of the ruler and the people in his advice to Duke Ai. The implication was that the Duke's proposal to increase the taxation was due to the insufficiency of his revenues for state expenditure; to insure the sufficiency of state expenditure, then, what could take precedence over measures to insure sufficiency for his people?

4. Qǐgǔ:

If, indeed,

the farming lands were tithed with a sincere wish to be thrifty in expenditure and to be considerate in showing love to the people,
the one-tenth tax on the agricultural produce were levied with no scheme to exploit the people and to seek extravagance for the person of the ruler himself;

Then,

the exertions of the people would not be burdened with excessive taxations, the accumulation of the people's property would not be exhausted by undue demands;
within common households there would be enough savings and accumulation, leaving little worry over caring for parents and raising the young,
in the ordinary farms there would be abundant grains and millets, warding off the anxieties of nurturing the living and of honoring the dead.

5. Xùgû:

If the people are enjoying sufficiency, for what conceivable reason should the ruler be left alone in poverty?

6. Zhōnggǔ:

I know that

what was kept in the common households would all be available to the ruler, without its being hoarded in the treasury to enable the ruler to claim, "This is my wealth";
what is stored in the farm and fields would all be accessible to the ruler, without its being accumulated in the vaults to enable the ruler to claim, "These are my possessions."

With inexhaustible availability, what worry is there for failure to respond to demand?

With inexhaustible supplies, what anxiety is there for lack of preparedness in emergency?

7. Hòugǔ:

The sacrificial animals and ritual cereals are plentiful to be used in religious offerings; and the jades and silks are abundant to be used as tributes and diplomatic gifts. Even if these were insufficient, the people will naturally supply them in full. Wherein will there be a shortage?

Food and delicacies, beefs and drinks are abundant for entertainment of state guests; carriages and horses, arms and equipment are enough for the preparation of wars and defense. Even if these were insufficient, the people will take care of the needs. Wherein again will there be insufficiency?

8. Dàjié:

Oh! The establishment of the tithe was originally for the good of the people, but in this very usage lies the sufficiency of national expenditure. Where then is there any need to increase taxation to attain national wealth?
