= CRuPAC =

CRuPAC (/ˈkruːpæk/ KROO-pak) is an acronym that generally stands for: Conclusion, Rule, Proof, Application and Conclusion. It functions as a system for organizing a closed legal brief. The CRuPAC format is a "closed" format that is frequently used in responsive legal pleadings, where the issue has already been properly framed and identified by the movant (often through use of the related IRAC methodology). Some authors have suggested dropping the "P" section of CRuPAC, which results in only four sections: Conclusion, Rule, Application and Conclusion

== The Sections of a CRuPAC ==
=== Conclusion ===
The CRuPAC starts by stating the conclusion that the author wishes the reader (or judge) to reach.

=== Rules ===
The rules section of a CRuPAC follows the conclusion. The rule section of a CRuPAC is the statement of the rules that govern the particular question. Rules may include statutes, constitutions, the Rules of Civil Procedure, the Rules of Criminal Procedure, the Rules of Evidence, etc. The pertinent rule may also be included in Restatements of the Law, or the common law as derived from court case precedent. Which rules are applicable depends entirely on the question being addressed.

=== Proof ===
The "P" in CRuPAC stands for "proof", although many attorneys sometimes refer to this as the "precedent" section. In the proof section, the author uses case law to prove how the rule operates and to give examples of how the rule is used.

=== Application ===
The application section of a CRuPAC applies the rules developed in the rules section to the specific facts of the issue at hand. It is generally improper to introduce new rules in the Application section. If the rules developed in the rules section include common law decisions, then the most efficient way of applying those rules to the facts is by the method compare and contrast, in which the facts of the cases cited as precedent are compared to the facts in the current litigation.

=== Conclusion ===
The (second) conclusion section of a CRuPAC restates the introductory conclusion. It is important that the (second) conclusion not merely copy the introduction verbatim; but rather, that the second conclusion restate the introduction in a compelling manner. It is never proper to introduce new argument or rules in the conclusion. By using two conclusion sections, the CRUPAC applies the maxim: "Tell 'em what you're gonna tell 'em, then tell 'em what you told 'em."
