= Guideline =

Statement by which to determine a course of action

A guideline is a statement by which to determine a course of action. It aims to streamline particular processes according to a set routine or sound practice. They may be issued by and used by any organization (governmental or private) to make the actions of its employees or divisions more predictable, and presumably of higher quality. A guideline is similar to a rule, but are legally less binding as justified deviations are possible.

== List of guidelines ==
Examples of guidelines are:

- Code of practice
- EASE Guidelines for Authors and Translators of Scientific Articles
- Federal Sentencing Guidelines
- Guidelines for Examination in the European Patent Office
- Medical guidelines
- Publicly Available Specification
- Programming style guidelines
- UNGEGN Toponymic Guidelines
