= Eight-legged essay =

Essay style in Chinese imperial examinations

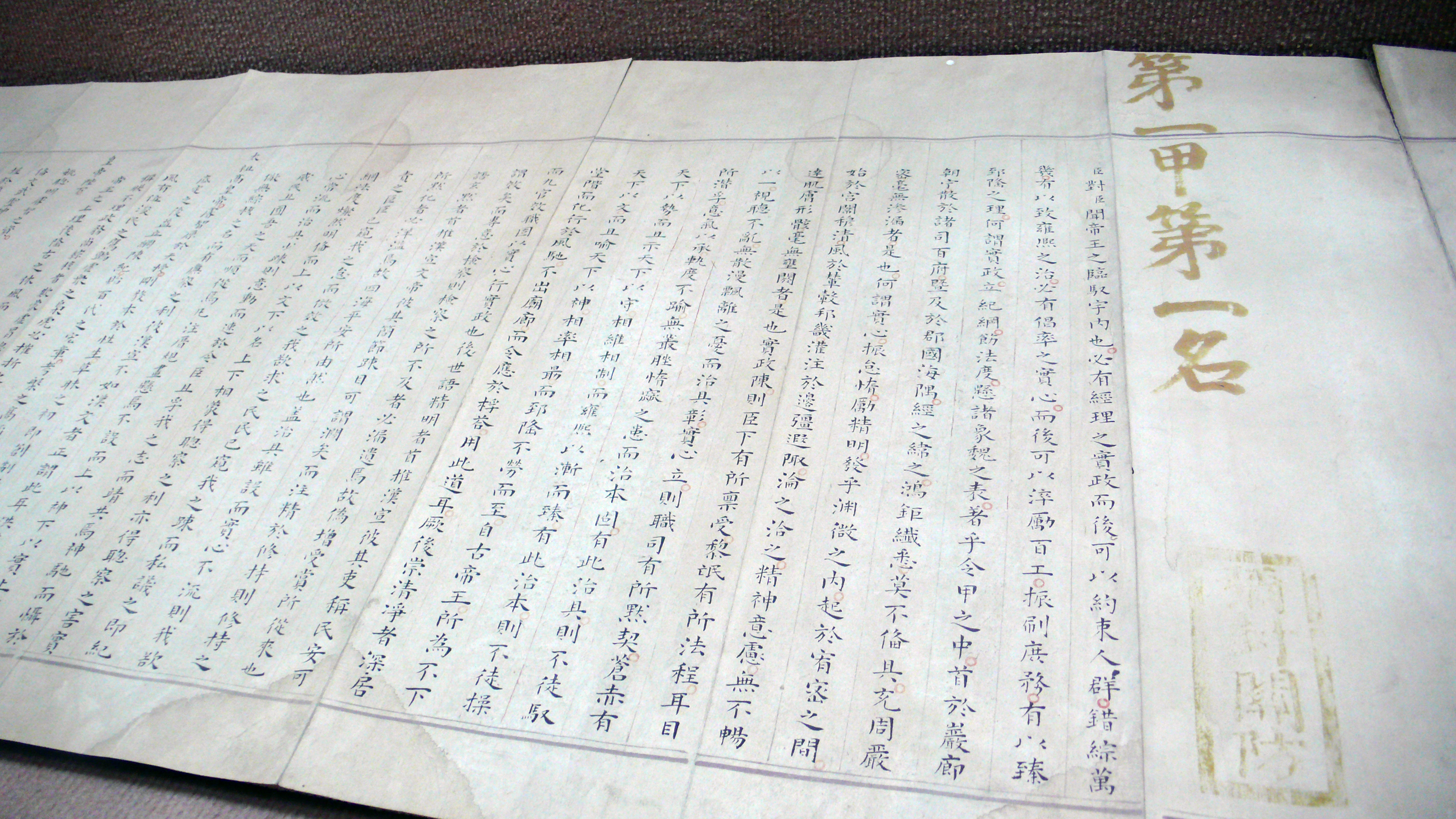
- Imperial exam paper of Ming dynasty Zhuangyuan Zhao Bing-zhong of 1598 AD
- Chinese: 八股 or 八股文
- Literal meaning: Eight-legged Essay
Transcriptions
Standard Mandarin
- Hanyu Pinyin: bāgǔ or bāgǔwén
Yue: Cantonese
- Jyutping: baat3 gu2

The eight-legged essay (Chinese: 八股文; pinyin: bāgǔwén) was a style of essay in imperial examinations during the Ming and Qing dynasties in China. The eight-legged essay was intended to assess candidates' merits for government service, often focusing on Confucian thought and knowledge of the Four Books and Five Classics, in relation to governmental ideals. Various skills were examined, including the ability to write coherently and to display basic logic. Due to its rigid, formulaic attributes, the eight-legged essay is often accused by later Chinese critics to have contributed to China's "cultural stagnation and economic backwardness" in the 19th century.

== Name ==
The eight "legs" are the eight sections of the essay that form its basic structure. These sections are "breaking open the topic (破題 pò tí)", "receiving the topic (承題 chéng tí)", "beginning discussion (起講 qǐ jiǎng)", "initial leg (起股 qǐ gǔ)", "middle leg (中股 zhōng gǔ)", "later leg (後股 hòu gǔ)", "final leg (束股 shù gǔ)", "conclusion (大結 dà jié)."

== History ==
=== Ming dynasty ===
The roots of the eight-legged essay likely came from a different rhetorical form called Jingyi popularized by reformer and poet Wang Anshi (1021–1086), in the eleventh century. This eventually led to the form known as qǐchéngzhuǎnhé (起承轉合) which then evolved into the eight-legged essay in the Ming dynasty (1368–1644).

The eight-legged essay format did not become prevalent as a standard essay in the civil service examination until early Ming dynasty, when the composition of the essay was clearly specified. In the seventeenth century, Gu Yanwu stated that this form of essay-writing became standardized precisely during the 15th century, when the eight parts of the essay were determined. The term "eight-legged essay" formally appeared during the early years of the Chenghua Emperor's reign (1464–1487) for the first time. From then, it started to be required in civil service examinations in the 1480s.

Since mastery of the form was a requirement for success in the examinations, commercial printers during the Ming dynasty began to print successful examination essays as guides for aspiring candidates. The first of these appeared in pirated form during the 16th century, and the practice gained official approval in 1587, when the government suggested that the best works of the previous century be reprinted as examples.

=== Qing dynasty ===
There was widespread dissatisfaction with the eight-legged essay during the Qing dynasty. In the beginning of the Kangxi reign, the state under the rule of the Four Regents issued an order revoking the need to use the format in all civil service exams, although the order was later repealed. The Qianlong Emperor said that he could not comprehend the eight-legged essays written by many exam-takers. The eight-legged essay was permanently abolished in 1905 by the Guangxu Emperor.

== Structure and content ==
Structurally and stylistically, the eight-legged essay was restrictive and rigid. Rules governed different components of the essay, including restrictions on the number of sentences in total, the number of words in total, the format and structure of the essay, and rhyming techniques.

In terms of the content, the exam-takers were required to compose their essays under a pre-assigned title and rhyming word, around which they needed to rhyme their essays or poems. Writers were also advised to avoid the use of offensive vocabulary and clues that could indicate their own identity or social status.

The components of the essay were usually in a consistent format, although there were variations; in particular:

- Xùgǔ (small/transition leg) could be added; it functioned as a prelude to the main theme, and was placed just before zhōnggǔ (central leg).
- Shùgǔ (final leg) could be omitted.

English	Hanzi	Definition
Opening	破題 pòtí "breaking open the topic"	Two sentences of prose that function to broach the topic and demonstrate the test-taker's knowledge about the title and its source. Failure to break open the title is termed màtí (scolding the title).
Amplification	承題 chéngtí "receiving the topic"	Five (or three to four) sentences of prose elaborating upon and clarifying the theme without revealing what the later sections would convey. It was conventional to address at the end why the person making the quote in the title did so.
Preliminary exposition	起講 qǐjiǎng "beginning discussion"	This is when the essay begins formally. It helps form the shape of the topic and the essay.
Initial argument	起股 qǐgǔ "initial leg"	A specified number (4, 5, 8 or 9) of sentence pairs written in parallel "harmoniously contrasted," developing the initial argument.
Central argument	中股 zhōnggǔ "middle leg"	Sentences in which the central points of the essay are expounded freely. There is usually no limit to the number of words here, nor do the sentences need to be written in parallel.
Latter argument	後股 hòugǔ "later leg"	Sentences are written in parallel, with no limit as to their number. Here, points not addressed in the previous section are discussed; otherwise, the writer may continue padding the ideas in the central argument. It is to be written in a serious tone rooted in realism. It is the most important part of the essay.
Final argument	束股 shùgǔ "final leg"	Parallel sentence groups, each one consisting of either two to three, or else four to five, lines. Here, the main theme is revisited and loose ends are tied up.
Conclusion	大結 dàjié "big knot"	Prose text where the concluding remarks are made. Test-takers summarize the essay thoroughly and energetically.

== Sample essays ==
=== Wang Ao ===
The following is a translation of an original eight-legged essay, written by Wang Ao (1450–1524), who was considered to be a master of the form.

Essay Topic:

"If the people enjoy sufficiency how could the ruler suffer from insufficiency?"

1. Pòtí:

When the people below are rich, the ruler at the top will naturally be rich.

2. Chéngtí:

This is so because the wealth of the ruler is something kept by the people. If the people are already rich, how can it stand to reason that the ruler alone is poor?

3. Qǐjiǎng:

You Ruo spoke from profundity the idea of the oneness of the ruler and the people in his advice to Duke Ai. The implication was that the Duke's proposal to increase the taxation was due to the insufficiency of his revenues for state expenditure; to insure the sufficiency of state expenditure, then, what could take precedence over measures to insure sufficiency for his people?

4. Qǐgǔ:

If, indeed,

the farming lands were tithed with a sincere wish to be thrifty in expenditure and to be considerate in showing love to the people,
the one-tenth tax on the agricultural produce were levied with no scheme to exploit the people and to seek extravagance for the person of the ruler himself;

Then,

the exertions of the people would not be burdened with excessive taxations, the accumulation of the people's property would not be exhausted by undue demands;
within common households there would be enough savings and accumulation, leaving little worry over caring for parents and raising the young,
in the ordinary farms there would be abundant grains and millets, warding off the anxieties of nurturing the living and of honoring the dead.

5. Xùgǔ:

If the people are enjoying sufficiency, for what conceivable reason should the ruler be left alone in poverty?

6. Zhōnggǔ:

I know that

what was kept in the common households would all be available to the ruler, without its being hoarded in the treasury to enable the ruler to claim, "This is my wealth";
what is stored in the farm and fields would all be accessible to the ruler, without its being accumulated in the vaults to enable the ruler to claim, "These are my possessions."

With inexhaustible availability, what worry is there for failure to respond to demand?

With inexhaustible supplies, what anxiety is there for lack of preparedness in emergency?

7. Hòugǔ:

The sacrificial animals and ritual cereals are plentiful to be used in religious offerings; and the jades and silks are abundant to be used as tributes and diplomatic gifts. Even if these were insufficient, the people will naturally supply them in full. Wherein will there be a shortage?

Food and delicacies, beefs and drinks are abundant for entertainment of state guests; carriages and horses, arms and equipment are enough for the preparation of wars and defense. Even if these were insufficient, the people will take care of the needs. Wherein again will there be insufficiency?

8. Dàjié:

Oh! The establishment of the tithe was originally for the good of the people, but in this very usage lies the sufficiency of national expenditure. Where then is there any need to increase taxation to attain national wealth?

=== Tang Shunzi ===
This essay was written by Tang Shunzi, who was recognized as the first place in 1529 with the help of his eight-legged essay. It was translated by Andrew Lo.

Essay Topic:

"Zi Mo (子莫) holds on to the middle ... Holding on to the middle is closer to being right, but to do this without the proper measure is not different from holding to one extreme."

1. Pòtí:

Mencius's contemporary Zi Mo wanted to rectify the deviation of heterodox teachings, but did not realize that he himself fell into deviation.

2. Chéngtí:

The fact is, the middle is defined as "not deviant," and the correct application of the middle is the proper measure. Zi Mo wanted to rectify the deviant ways of Yang Zi (楊子) and Mo Zi (墨子), but did not know the proper measure, so this was but another deviation. This was the standard Mencius used to repudiate his error and to establish our way.

3. Qǐjiǎng:

To elaborate, for our Way is the principal one, but the manifestations are many; egoism and indiscriminate love certainly deviate from the Way. And our way uses the one principle to join together the many, but those who hold on to egoism or indiscriminate love are certainly holding on to an extreme which leads nowhere. Thus there was Zi Mo who understood the errors of Yang Zi and Mo Zi, and thereupon mediated between the two in order to grasp the middle course.

4. Qǐgǔ:

Zi Mo would probably say, I cannot bear to be like Yang Zi, who cut off all ties with others in a niggardly fashion; I simply stop short of loving indiscriminately.

I have not time to be like Mo Zi who joyfully sacrifices himself for others: I simply stop short of being an egoist.

Because one rejects egoism, one may be thought to be escaping from the error of Yang Zi and heading towards benevolence.

Because one rejects indiscriminate love, one may be thought to be escaping for the error of Mo Zi and heading towards righteousness.

5. Xùgǔ:

Zi Mo seems to be close to the Way, but he does not understand the following: the proper measure is defined as following the Way at the right time; the middle is defined as others with the proper measure; and the position between Yang Zi and Mo Zi is not the place to seek the middle.

6. Zhōnggǔ:

If one just knows that one should not sever ties with others but does not know how to weigh others to give evenly, then there is no danger of becoming an egoist, but on the other hand those who follow the Way and strive to perfect themselves will also be seen as approaching egoism and consequently one will not dare act in like manner.

If one understands that one should not sacrifice oneself for others but cannot give to others on an individual basis, then there is no danger of loving indiscriminately, but on the other hand those who follow the Way and strive to perfect the whole Empire will also be seen as approaching indiscriminate love and consequently one will not be willing to act in like manner.

7. Hòugǔ:

One may say that I plan to escape from Yang Zi. However, Yang Zi saw himself and not others, while Zi Mo saw a fixed position not an open passage. In essence, all these are but parochial teachings. Really, can those who know how to adapt to myriad changes be like this?

One may say that I plan to escape from Mo Zi. However, Mo Zi saw others and not himself, while Zi Mo saw tracks and not transformations. In essence all these are but one-sided delusions. Really, can those who respond to eternal inconstancy be like this?

8. Shùgû:

The point is, egoism is one extreme, and indiscriminate love is another extreme. That is why it is easy to understand that Yang Zi and Mo Zi each held on to an extreme.

The middle is not an extreme: but if one holds on to the middle without applying the proper measure, then this is also an extreme. That is why it is difficult to understand that Zi Mo was holding on to an extreme.

9. Dàjié:

If Mencius had not demonstrated this with his eloquence, then most people would have thought that Zi Mo was able to be one with the Way.

== Printing and publishing ==
There are two types of printing and publishing related to the eight-legged essay, one for the exams themselves and the other for public purposes. After the test-takers finished with their exams, their papers were collected in the testing room and sent over to be graded. They were then printed with the graders' comments and in the order of the score rank. During the late Ming dynasty, commercial publishing also increased in the face of increasing commercialization of culture. The public printing, publishing, and dissemination of the essays prompted more people to be interested candidates of the civil service examination during the Ming and Qing dynasties.

== Viewpoints ==
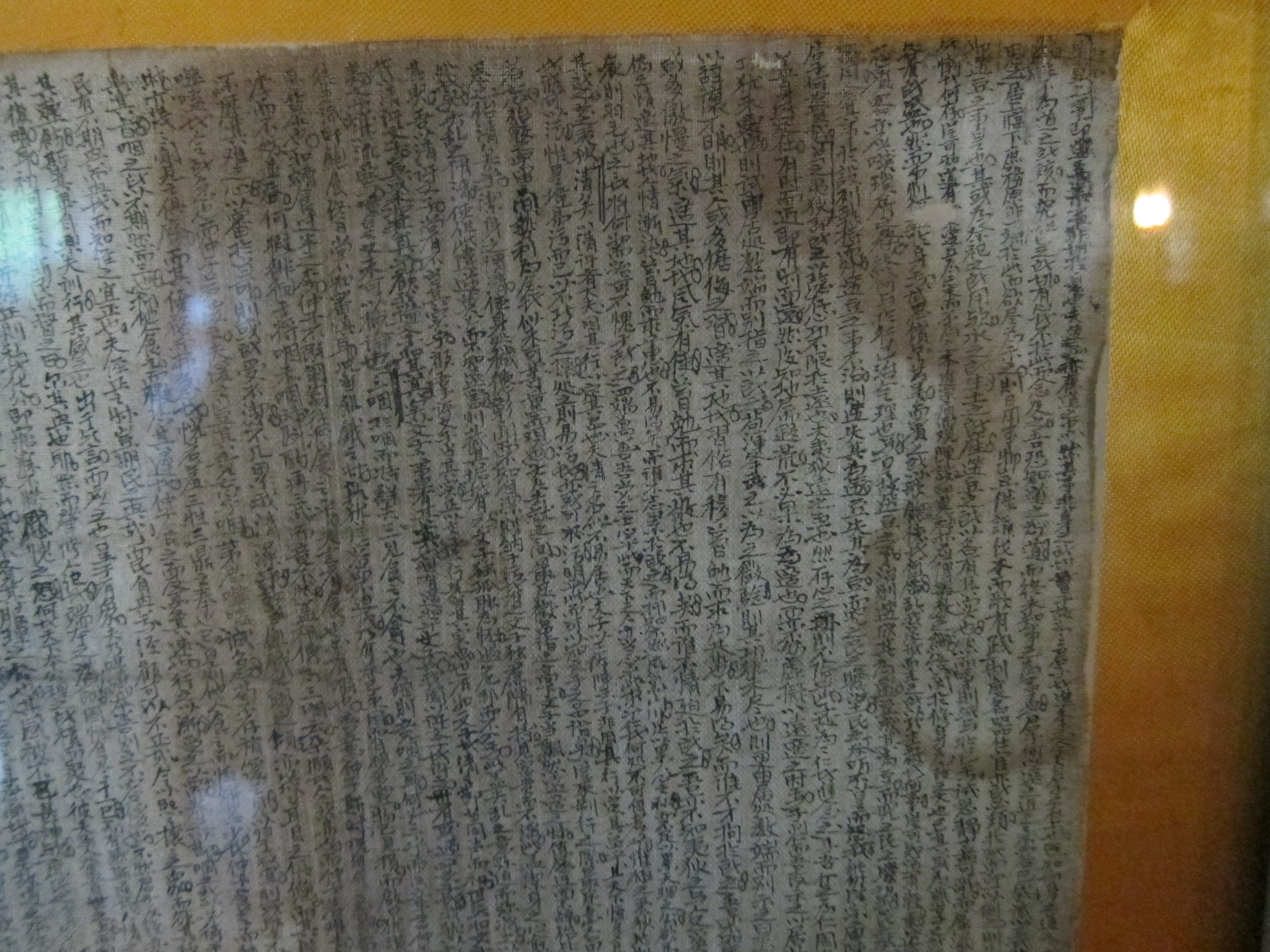
Imperial examination cheating material, or crib sheet

=== Positive ===
One virtue of the eight-legged essays is that its composition is well defined and easy to follow. For the purpose of administering a large group of exam-takers, this structure allowed convenient regulation as the exam-takers were not likely to deviate from the requirements. Thus, this format contributed to ensuring standard and fairness in the civil service examination system. The examiners could reduce the amount of time spent in grading exams by being accustomed to this format, and uncertainties in the grading schemes were reduced. A scholar named Tian Qilin defended the eight-legged essay by arguing that it embodies the complex Chinese cultural and literary tradition.

=== Negative ===
As early as the 17th century, the form's adoption was blamed for the decline of classical poetry and prose during the Ming dynasty. The critic Wu Qiao wrote that "people exhausted themselves on the eight-legged essay, and poetry was only composed with their spare energy." Writing at the same time, the political theorist and philosopher Huang Zongxi echoed these sentiments. Also, the essay did not allow for any personal opinion and was completely impartial. As a result, according to some modern Chinese critics, it led to the gradual narrowing of people's innovative thinking and consequently their minds, thus achieving a constraining effect on Chinese people and the nation.

== See also ==
- Analects
- Doctrine of the Mean
- Great Learning
- Imperial examination in Chinese mythology
- Social structure of China
- The Scholars
- Five-paragraph essay
