= EASE Guidelines for Authors and Translators of Scientific Articles =

Document advising international scientific communication

EASE Guidelines for Authors and Translators of Scientific Articles to be Published in English (often shortened to EASE Guidelines for Authors and Translators or EASE Guidelines) were first published by the European Association of Science Editors (EASE) in 2010. Updated versions are periodically released at the EASE Guidelines page of the EASE website. EASE Guidelines summarize the most important editorial recommendations, aiming to make international scientific communication more efficient and to aid in preventing scientific misconduct. They also support the global initiative Healthcare Information For All by 2015 by advising authors to make abstracts of their papers highly informative, reliable, and easily understandable. The document has been translated into many languages to facilitate its popularization worldwide and help scientists from non-Anglophone countries.

== History ==
EASE Guidelines are a result of long discussions on the electronic EASE Forum and during the 2009 EASE conference in Pisa, as well as subsequent consultations within the EASE Council.

== Contents ==
The document includes a succinct set of practical guidelines explaining how to write complete, concise and clear manuscripts. It is supplemented with a list for further reading as well as several short appendices (Abstracts; Ambiguity; Cohesion; Ethics; Plurals; Simplicity; Spelling; Text-tables) that present selected issues in greater detail or provide more examples.

EASE Guidelines emphasize the need for proper structuring of the article (e.g. making the tested hypothesis clear in the Introduction), making the abstract highly informative (including most important data and conclusions), and writing understandably, so that the readers are not discouraged or confused. Ethical issues are also taken into account, e.g. authorship criteria, plagiarism, redundant publications, and other types of scientific misconduct. The 2013 edition of the publication ethics checklist was presented at the 3rd World Conference on Research Integrity in Montreal in May 2013. It can be used routinely during submission, as one short form instead of many separate forms to be filled by authors.

== Perspectives ==
The EASE Council plans to add more appendices on specific subjects and more translations (made mostly by volunteers), as well as to review EASE Guidelines annually.

Non-commercial printing of the document is allowed, so it can be used as a handout, e.g. for courses in scientific writing and publication ethics.

== See also ==
- Committee on Publication Ethics (COPE)
- Conflicts of interest in academic publishing
- European Association of Science Editors
- International Council for Science (ICSU)
- IMRAD
- Scientific misconduct
- Uniform Requirements for Manuscripts Submitted to Biomedical Journals
- United States Office of Research Integrity
