= Thesis statement =

Statement that reflects the main idea of a thesis

A thesis statement is a statement of one's core argument, the main idea(s), and/or a concise summary of an essay, research paper, etc. It is usually expressed in one or two sentences near the beginning of a paper, and may be reiterated elsewhere, such as in the conclusion. In some contexts, such as in the British educational system, a thesis statement is generally considered synonymous with one's argument.

== History ==
The "thesis statement" comes from the concept of a thesis (θέσῐς, thésis) as it was articulated by Aristotle in Topica. Aristotle's definition of a thesis is "a conception which is contrary to accepted opinion." He also notes that this contrary view must come from an informed position; not every contrary view is a thesis.

== Variations ==
There are many different ways of writing a thesis statement depending on the context of one's writing. For example, American and British education systems frame the thesis statement differently. American schools generally encourage students to write their thesis statement so that the writer's ultimate conclusion(s) on the topic described in their paper is made clear; this opinion is then typically reiterated in the conclusion. In British schooling, the initial thesis statement describes the intended scope of the paper and the conclusion's restatement of the thesis provides the writer's point of view.

The genre one is writing in will also shape the way one crafts a thesis as different genres come with different expectations for a thesis. Regardless of the potential for variation, oftentimes a thesis is considered "good" or "strong" when it is both specific (or "narrow") and sufficiently supported by the evidence/material in the rest of the writer's piece.

== Criticisms ==
Some commentators have argued that excessive emphasis on the importance of thesis statements in the early stages of university education, particularly in American composition and rhetoric courses, encourages inappropriately assertive writing, that overlooks the complexity and nuance expected in professional academic writing.

== See also ==
- Topic sentence
