= Schaffer method =

Instructional method for essay writing

The Schaffer method is a formula for essay writing that is taught in some U.S. middle schools and high schools. Developed by a San Diego teacher named Jane Schaffer, who started offering training and a 45-day curriculum in 1995, it is intended to help students who struggle with structuring essays by providing a framework. Originally developed for personal narratives and essays about literature, the curriculum now also covers expository and argument essays.

== Essay structure ==
The essay is to consist of an introduction three or more sentences long and containing a thesis statement, a conclusion incorporating all the writer's commentary and bringing the essay to a close, and two or three body paragraphs; Schaffer herself preferred to teach a four-paragraph essay rather than the traditional five-paragraph essay.

== Body paragraph structure ==
Each body paragraph should consist of eight sentences: a topic sentence (T) followed by two "chunks" made up of a sentence presenting a concrete detail (CD) such as a fact, quotation, plot point, or example, followed by two sentences of commentary on that material (CM), and then by a concluding sentence (CS). To help students internalize this formula, teachers use methods including colored pens and writing "fact, opinion, opinion, fact, opinion, opinion" in the margin. Longer body paragraphs are possible but must maintain the same 1:2 ratio of CD to CM in the "chunks".

Commentary sentences often start with a transition such as the following:

- This (also) shows that
- This is (important) because
- In addition
- Furthermore
- Therefore
- Also
- For example

Conclusion sentences usually start with one of the following:

- Finally
- In a word
- In brief, Briefly
- In conclusion, To conclude
- In the end
- In the final analysis
- On the whole
- Thus, to conclude
- To summarize, In sum, To sum up, In summary
- Mostly
- As a result
- Therefore

== Critical analysis ==
Mark Wiley, coordinator of the composition program at California State University, Long Beach, evaluated the Schaffer method in 2000 as providing a valuable guide to the basics of academic writing, but not conducive to students' exploring their own responses to complex ideas and best taught as a possible strategy.

The Schaffer method has been studied in several master's theses in education. In 2002, Heather McClelland sought to evaluate the effect of teaching formulaic strategies in order to assist teachers. In 2012, Richard Roybal tested it with 60 8th-grade students, finding that while 40% wrote three supporting topic sentences, 62% included at least two. In 2015, Patricia Solomon related instruction in scientific writing for a high school course in biology to the students' Schaffer method instruction in writing about literature; she found little evidence of transfer of learning to the new field.
