= Argumentative =

Evidentiary objection

In the American legal system, argumentative is an evidentiary objection raised in response to a question which prompts a witness to draw inferences from facts of the case.

A lawyer on direct examination asks his witness, a layman with no legal training, "So John Doe was driving negligently?" Opposing counsel could raise an argumentative objection. In this context, "negligently" is a legal term of art with a precise and narrow meaning, and the witness cannot reasonably answer the question without understanding the relevant law. Since the lawyer is "arguing" his case that John Doe was driving negligently through the witness, the objection would be sustained and the improper statements stricken from the record.

In this example, however, the lawyer conducting the direct examination may have an opportunity to rephrase his question. If the judge sustains the argumentative objection, the lawyer may instead ask questions such as "was John Doe exceeding the posted speed limit?", "was John Doe making lane changes without proper signals?", "how did Mr. Doe respond to your comments about his driving," or "Did you feel unsafe when you were a passenger in the car driven by John Doe?"

Such questions may be permitted and require no legal expertise for a layman to answer, thus allowing the lawyer to introduce testimony about John Doe's driving habits without specifically using the legal term negligence.
