= IRAC =

Legal methodology

IRAC (/ˈaɪræk/ EYE-rak) is an acronym that generally stands for: Issue, Rule, Application, and Conclusion. It functions as a methodology for legal analysis. The IRAC format is mostly used in hypothetical questions in law school and bar exams.

== Sections of an IRAC ==
=== Issue ===
In the IRAC method of legal analysis, the "issue" is simply a legal question that must be answered. An issue arises when the facts of a case present a legal ambiguity that must be resolved in a case, and legal researchers (whether paralegals, law students, lawyers, or judges) typically resolve the issue by consulting legal precedent (existing statutes, past cases, court rules, etc.). For example, suppose the law required that a lawsuit had to be filed within one year of an allegedly negligent act. If the 365th day falls on a Sunday, then the issue would be whether or not the law counts weekends as part of its computation of the one-year time limit. Would the plaintiff have to file by the preceding Friday? Would the law excuse the weekend and consider a Monday filing to be timely, even though that would technically be the 366th day? In order to answer the legal question (issue), one would move to the next letter in the IRAC acronym: "R", which stands for Rule.

=== Rule ===
The Rule section of an IRAC follows the statement of the issue at hand. The rule section of an IRAC is the statement of the rules pertinent in deciding the issue stated. Rules in a common law jurisdiction derive from court case precedent and statute. The information included in the rules section depends heavily on the specificity of the question at hand. If the question states a specific jurisdiction then it is proper to include rules specific to that jurisdiction. Another distinction often made in the rule section is a clear delineation of rules that are in holding, and binding based on the authority of the hierarchy of the court, being ratio decidendi, and being the majority ruling, or simply persuasive. There are occasions when rules are adopted on the basis they are the only clearly articulated rules on the issue, in spite of being minority decisions, obiter dicta, and from lower courts, in other jurisdictions, which have never been contradicted.

The rules help make a correct legal analysis of the issue at hand using the facts of the case. The rules section needs to be a legal summary of all the rules used in the analysis and is often written in a manner which paraphrases or otherwise analytically condenses information into applicable rules.

=== Application ===
The Application (or Analysis) section of an IRAC applies the rules developed in the rules section to the specific facts of the issue at hand. This section uses only the rules stated in the rules section of the IRAC and usually utilizes all the rules stated including exceptions as is required by the analysis. It is important in this section to apply the rules to the facts of the case and explain or argue why a particular rule applies or does not apply in the case presented. The application/analysis section is the most important section of an IRAC because it develops the answer to the issue at hand. It is useful to think like a lawyer, arguing the facts of the matter from both sides while sticking to the rules before coming to a decision.

=== Conclusion ===
The Conclusion section of an IRAC directly answers the question presented in the issue section of the IRAC. It is important for the methodology of the IRAC that the conclusion section of the IRAC not introduce any new rules or analysis. This section restates the issue and provides the final answer. Conclusion is a vital process where the final calls are distributed upon the previous cases and are redefined by the judge.

== Facts ==
The facts of a case are central to every step in the IRAC. It is from the facts that the issues are identified. It is the facts that lead to the identification of the most appropriate rules, and the rules which lead to the most useful way of construing the facts. Analysis requires the interpretation of facts and rules. The conclusion is a decision based on the application of the rules to the facts for each issue.

== Criticism ==
IRAC has many proponents and opponents. The main arguments of the proponents of the IRAC methodology say it reduces legal reasoning to the application of a formula that helps organize the legal analysis. Since an organized legal analysis is easier to follow and reduces errors in reasoning, therefore, the proponents argue that the IRAC is a very useful tool.

The opponents of the IRAC fall into two categories. The first category are those who object to using an IRAC because of its strict and unwieldy format. Most of these critics offer an alternative version of the IRAC such as MIRAT, IDAR, CREAC, TREACC, CRuPAC, ISAAC and ILAC. Each new iteration is supposed to cure the defects of the IRAC and offer more or less freedom depending upon the format. A very good example of such an alternative format is the CREAC which is said to offer more clarity and congruity. They argue this based upon the repetition of the conclusion in the beginning and the end which is said to leave no doubt as to the final answer and offer congruity to the overall reasoning. It also has an explanation of the rules section which helps delineate rules into stating the rules and explaining the rules for further clarity.

The second category of critics of the IRAC say that it tends to lead to overwriting, and oversimplifying the complexity of proper legal analysis. This group believes that a good legal analysis consists of a thoughtful, careful, well researched essay that is written in a format most amiable to the writer. The importance of an open format amiable to the writer is supposed to let the legal reasoners concentrate on expressing their argument to the best of their abilities instead of concentrating on adhering to a strict format that reduces this focus.

== Example ==
A generic IRAC on a law school exam would consist of an answer to a question. The following example demonstrates a generic IRAC as an answer to a question: Person "A" walks into a grocery store and picks up a loaf of bread. He then stuffs the bread beneath his jacket. A security attendant sees him and follows him to the cash register. Person A passes through without stopping to pay for anything. The security attendant stops him at the gate. He detains person A while he interrogates him. Person A is unresponsive and uncooperative and in fact downright hostile to the charges being leveled at him by the security attendant. Person A is held for a period of two hours at the end of which it is found that he had actually put the loaf of bread back and was not stealing. Person A sues the grocery store for false imprisonment. Would person A prevail in court?

Issue

The issue here is whether person A could prevail in court by alleging that he was falsely imprisoned.

Rules

Most jurisdictions in the United States allow recovery for false imprisonment. The courts look at two elements in determining whether a person has been falsely imprisoned, namely just cause and authority. In looking at the element of just cause, courts further analyze two factors: reasonable suspicion and the environment in which the actions take place.

If a person suspects that he is being deprived of property legally attached to him and he can show that his suspicions are reasonable then he is said to have a reasonable suspicion. Courts also look at whether the activity in question took place in an environment where stealing is common. Crowded public places and shops are considered to be more justifiable places where a person could have just cause for reasonable suspicion in comparison to private property or sparsely populated areas.

In looking at the other element of authority, the courts tend to favor people directly charged with handling security as people with the authority to detain a person in comparison to private individuals. The courts have made exceptions in the favor of the person conducting the detention if he is a shopkeeper. This special privilege is called the shopkeeper's privilege. In general the element of authority is usually seen as one part of a two part legal justification for legally justifiable detention. For example in cases involving detention by an officer of the law, courts have ruled that the officer has to have both just cause and authority. Authority in itself is not enough. The same reasoning applies to all detaining individuals. Exceptions are made in the case where a person of authority has to conduct an investigation with just cause and courts usually grant a reasonable amount of time in detention for this purpose. Here the reasonable amount of time a person can be kept in detention is directly related to the circumstances under which the detention takes place.

Application/Analysis

Person A was conducting his activity in a crowded place that happened to be a grocery store. He was further detained by a security attendant. The security attendant had seen him pick up a loaf of bread and walk past the cash register without paying. The security attendant detained him until he discovered that no theft had taken place. Person A was subsequently released upon this determination of fact.

A court looking at these facts would try to apply the two elements of false imprisonment. The first element of false imprisonment is just cause. The first factor of just cause is reasonable suspicion. The security attendant saw person A pick up a loaf of bread and stuff it beneath his jacket. This is an uncommon action as most grocery shop customers usually do not hide produce under their personal belongings. The security attendant, therefore, has reasonable suspicion because a reasonable person in his place would have also considered this action to be suspicious. Person A further walks by the cash register without paying. The security attendant has already seen person A hiding the bread under his jacket and honestly believes that person A is still in possession of the loaf of bread. A reasonable person in the security attendant's stead would arguably act to stop person A. Thus, this seems to satisfy the first factor of the element of just cause, reasonable suspicion.

The second factor of the element of just cause is the environment. The activity takes place in a grocery store. A grocery store is usually a place where shoplifters and other thieves operate regularly. This reduces the burden of just cause placed on the person performing the detention. The security attendant has to be unusually vigilant and suspicious of a person's motive because of his location. This then seems to satisfy the second factor of the element of just cause, environment.

The second element of false imprisonment is authority. The person performing the detention of A is the security attendant of the grocery store. He is the person charged with securing the grocery store and its property. The security attendant sees person A put the loaf of bread underneath his coat and walk through the checkout without paying. The security attendant now has to act because he has been charged with the security of the store and he has just cause. The security attendant performs the investigation after he puts person A in detention and it takes two hours. Two hours might seem like an unreasonable amount of time but given the fact that person A was unresponsive and uncooperative it seems to be reasonable. It also seems as if the security attendant was doing his due diligence as he releases person A as soon as the facts are established and it is shown that person A was not stealing the loaf of bread.

Finally we have to look at the fact that since the activity took place in a grocery store, the shopkeeper's privilege applies directly to the security attendant in charge of securing the store and its property. This privilege gives the security attendant extra leeway in detaining people in whom he has reasonable suspicion. Most courts would lean heavily towards the shopkeeper because person A was on the property of the grocery store and thus could be subjected to extra scrutiny given the long history of the shopkeeper's privilege in common law.

Conclusion

Person A would most likely not prevail in the courts because the security attendant does not satisfy either element of false imprisonment. The detention of person A was legal because the security attendant had both just cause and authority. Additionally, the shopkeeper's privilege further solidifies the legality of the detention. Person A, therefore, has no recourse under the law.

== Variations ==
- AFGAN (Application, Facts, Grounds, Answer, Negotiation)
- BaRAC / BRAC (Bold Assertion, Rule, Application, Conclusion)
- CI/REXAC (Conclusion, Introductory/Roadmap (Issue and Rule), Explanation, Application, Conclusion)
- CLEO (Claim, Law, Evaluation, Outcome)
- CRAAC (Conclusion, Rules, Analogous Case (if applicable), Application, Conclusion. This is mostly used for writing assignments.
- CRRACC (Conclusion, Rule, Rule Proof, Application, Counterargument, Conclusion)
- CRAB (Conclusion Rule Analysis Basis)
- CREAC (Conclusion, Rules, Explanation, Application, Conclusion)
- FIRAC (Facts, Issues, Relevant Legal Provisions and Rules, Application of Rules, Conclusion)
- HIRAC (Heading, Issue, Rule, Analysis/Application, Conclusion)
- IDAR (Issues, Doctrine, Application, Result).
- ILAC (Issue, Law, Application, Conclusion)
- IRAAC (Issue, Rule, Analogous Cases, Application, Conclusion)
- KUWAIT (Konclusion, Utility, Wording, Answer, Initiation, Thoughts)
- TREACC (Topic, Rule, Explanation, Analysis, Counterarguments, Conclusion)
- TRIAccC (Topic, Rule, Issues, Analysis [cases, conclusion], Conclusion)
- TREAT (Thesis, Rule, [Rule] Explanation, [Rule] Application, Thesis)
- TRRAC (Thesis, Rule Statement, Rule Explanation, Application, Conclusion)
- TUPAC (Topic, Utility, Proof, Analysis, Conclusion)
- CRuPAC (Conclusion, Rule, Proof, Analysis, Conclusion)
- MIRAT (Material Facts, Issues, Rules, Application, Tentative Conclusion).
- CIRAC (Conclusion, Issue, Rules, Application, Conclusion)
- IPAAC (Issue, Principle, Authority, Application, Conclusion)
- IRREAC (Issue, Rule, Rule Explanation, Application, Conclusion)
- IRACDD (Issue, Rule, Analysis, Conclusion, Defense, Damages).
