= Glossary of journalism =

This glossary of journalism is a list of definitions of terms and concepts used in journalism, its sub-disciplines, and related fields, including news reporting, publishing, broadcast journalism, and various types of journalistic media.

== A ==
above the fold
adversarial journalism
A style of journalism in which journalists adopt a confrontational approach of reporting and interviewing—often within investigative or watchdog reporting—to scrutinize and challenge claims, expose inconsistencies, and hold powerful individuals or institutions accountable in service of the public.
advocacy journalism
A type of journalism which deliberately adopts a non-objective viewpoint, usually committed to the endorsement of a particular social or political cause, policy, campaign, organization, demographic, or individual.
alternative journalism
A type of journalism practiced in alternative media, typically by open, participatory, non-professionalized, non-commercial, and non-hierarchical media organizations. Precisely what is labeled alternative journalism has changed over time, but implicit in the genre is a rejection and critique of the practices of mainstream journalism, such that alternative journalists may perceive themselves as working to different values and ethics, covering different stories, giving access to a different cast of presenters and sources, or operating as a form of watchdog on mainstream media.
analytic journalism
anchor
Another name for a newsreader, used primarily in the United States.
anonymous source
arts journalism
A branch of journalism concerned with the reporting and discussion of the arts, including but not limited to the visual arts, film, literature, music, theater, and architecture.
assignment
An instruction to a reporter to cover an event.
assignment editor
Associated Press (AP)
The world's largest independent news agency, supplying news services for a fee to media around the world.

== B ==
B copy
The bottom section of a story in a periodical, written ahead of the event it describes in order to save time in processing and completing the story before the publication deadline.
backgrounder
A piece of journalism that accompanies or follows a news item and provides the audience with additional historical or other contextualizing information or analysis.
banner

An extremely large headline stretching across the width of a page, usually at the top.
beat reporting

A type of journalism focused on reporting current events within a particular organization, community, or geographical locale, or about a particular issue or subject. The term refers to reporters having to "beat" (walk) the streets of a neighborhood in order to interact with locals and be informed of the latest news events, with the goal of capturing the general vibe of a place or scene. Beat reporters may also monitor social media for potential stories and sources, and often maintain a network of contacts who can provide tips or with whom rumors can be fact-checked.
blockline
Another name for the caption of a photograph.
blogging
breaking news

1. A news story that has only very recently occurred and is newly reported, especially in broadcast journalism, and which a broadcaster may decide warrants the interruption of scheduled programming or other news in order to report it. Breaking news is often covered live and updated as a running story.
2. The most significant news story of the moment.
3. A story that emerges or unfolds unexpectedly, as opposed to a diary story.
bright
A short, amusing story.
broadcast journalism
broadcasting
The distribution of audio and audiovisual content to widely dispersed audiences through an electronic mass communications medium, traditionally via technologies that transmit radio waves to numerous recipients in a one-to-many model (as opposed to one-to-one transmission intended for a single recipient). The term generally includes distribution by radio, television, and Internet but excludes non-electronic forms of communication, even if they also reach a widespread audience, such as printed newspaper delivery.
broadsheet
bulletin
An organized collection of news stories broadcast on radio or television at a regular time as part of a news cycle; a bulletin may also include reporting on sports, the stock market, weather, etc. See also newscast.
business journalism
byline

The name of the journalist who has written a particular story, printed at the beginning or the end of an article. A byline may include additional information after the name indicating the journalist's official occupational title or contact details, and sometimes a photograph of the journalist.

== C ==
caption

1. Explanatory text placed below or beside a photograph, map, graph, or other form of graphic, in order to describe it and identify the photographers, creators, and/or owners.
2. In a television broadcast, a piece of text superimposed at the top or bottom of the screen that describes what is being shown, often the name of the person speaking and/or additional details about the reporting location or the source of the footage.
chequebook journalism

The practice of paying the participants in a news event a large sum of money for the exclusive rights to their story, as a means of gaining an advantage over journalistic competitors.
churnalism
A type of journalism that relies on recycling press releases and agency copy to fill newspaper pages or news bulletins, and which involves little or no independent reporting or attempt at verification.
citizen journalism

Any form of reporting on current events that is practiced by people outside the established media who are not professionally trained or formally employed as journalists but whose writing or other media output may contain journalistic elements. The term has most often been applied to bloggers and user-generated contributions to mainstream media, but has also been used to describe various forms of alternative media and community journalism. See also amateur journalism.
civic journalism
CNN effect
cod byline
The use of a fictitious name for a byline, giving the impression that an article has been written by a member of the publication's staff when in fact it has been supplied by a news agency.
cold type
collaborative journalism
column
1. A vertical block of text on a page, separated by margins and/or rules. Newspapers are commonly divided into visible columns.
2. A regular story or feature in a periodical, often on a specific topic and written by the same person, known as a columnist.
columnist
comics journalism
community journalism
contributing editor
copy
Written material intended for publication, as opposed to photographs or other elements of a publication's layout.
copy editing
copywriting
correction
correspondent
1. A reporter who sends news to a newspaper office or broadcast headquarters remotely, i.e. from outside the office or headquarters.
2. A person to whom a letter or document is written or addressed, or with whom an interview is conducted.
crony journalism
Reporting that ignores or treats lightly negative news about the friends of a particular reporter.
crosshead

A word or short phrase in larger type used to break up long columns of text, often a fragment of a strong quote from the paragraph which follows.
curtain raiser
A story written before a predicted event, setting the scene for when it happens. Such stories are often used at the start of election campaigns, sporting competitions, etc.
cutline
See caption.

== D ==
daily
A periodical for which new editions are published once per day, usually either on five days a week (every weekday), six days a week, or seven days a week (everyday including weekends).
data-driven journalism
dateline
A line preceding a written news story that lists the name of the city, town, or general location from which the story is reported and sometimes the date, particularly for stories that are not considered local for the publication, i.e. reported from a distant location.
dead air
An extended unwanted silence that interrupts a radio or television broadcast, during which no audio or video program material is transmitted, usually caused by technical or operating errors.
deadline
The time set by the editor or producer by which a reporter must submit a finished story; the cut-off point for the completion of a story before it is published.
deck
1. An individual row or line of type in a headline, e.g. a three-deck headline is set in three lines of text.
2. A sub-headline positioned below the main headline and describing a key part of the story.
delayed drop

An introduction to a story that does not make it immediately obvious what the story is about or what the main angle might be. It is used for effect, often in humorous stories.
digital divide
Inequality between human populations in access to or effective use of digital technology, including online journalism and other forms of Internet-based or mobile communication, especially that due to social, economic, political, or cultural factors which may make one group more or less likely to make use of online content than other groups.
digital doorstepping
The journalistic use of online social media to obtain the kind of information that in earlier eras would have required direct personal contact with the source, either face-to-face or on the telephone. The practice may include passive lifting of information, comments, or pictures from public social media profiles as well as direct requests for information or comments via social media.
digital journalism

== E ==
editor
editorial
editorial independence
A concept in journalistic ethics holding that journalists ought to be able to conduct their work without coming under undue influence to provide coverage tailored to suit the commercial interests of proprietors or advertisers.
editorialize
To write in an opinionated and subjective manner, as in an editorial.
endnote
A paragraph presented after the end of an article, usually in a different type, giving additional information about the writer of the article, or, in the case of a review, the details of the publication or performance being reviewed.
enterprise journalism
erratum

exclusive
A story that a reporter or publication has obtained to the exclusion of the competition; a story to which only the reporting publication has access.
explanatory journalism
A type of reporting that attempts to present ongoing news stories in a more accessible manner than conventional news sources by providing greater context and more detailed background information than might otherwise normally be provided in a traditional piece of journalism, with the goal of making the information understandable by a wider audience, including consumers who may not already be familiar with stylistic standards or industry-specific jargon associated with reporting on complex topics such as politics and law.
exposé
A piece of investigative journalism that uncovers and makes public some form of allegedly scandalous behavior.

== F ==
fact-checking
The process of verifying the factual accuracy or otherwise establishing the veracity of the information reported within a piece of journalism, whether before or after the content is published or broadcast. Internal fact-checking may be done in-house by the publisher prior to publication (often by the original author or reporter, by an editor, and/or by persons employed specifically as fact-checkers) in order to prevent inaccurate content from being published, but external fact-checking is also commonly done by third parties after publication in an effort to promote accurate and reliably sourced reporting and call attention to any inaccuracies, misquotes, and other distortions of the truth.
facticity
The factual quality of a piece of journalism.
false balance
feature
A story emphasizing the human or entertaining aspects of the situation it covers; a news story or other material that is highlighted as a special-interest piece or otherwise differentiated from straight news.
fifth estate
Five Ws
flannel panel
A column or box printed in a regular, fixed position in each edition of a publication that lists the names and/or responsibilities of the publication's owners, departments, officers and staff, and/or contributors, as well as the physical addresses of the publication's offices and information on how to contact them.
fourth estate
The press and the news media conceptualized as a distinctive estate of the realm, alongside the original three estates (nobility, commoners, and clergy) included in the traditional social hierarchy of much of Christian Europe. The notion refers particularly to the capacity of the media to wield great influence in politics and culture, and in some conceptualizations views them as quasi-constitutional watchdogs acting on behalf of a society's citizens. Compare fifth estate.
freedom of the press

The fundamental principle that journalists and media outlets have the right to communicate and express information freely across print, broadcast, and digital platforms. Such freedom implies minimal or no censorship or prior restraint by the government and is often protected by law or constitutional provisions, supporting transparency, accountability, and democratic discourse.

== G ==
gag order

A gag order is an official directive, typically issued by a court, that prohibits public disclosure or discussion of information related to a legal case, often restricting the press from reporting certain details. More broadly, the term can apply to any nonjudicial order or directive that bars the release of confidential information or discourages public discussion of a sensitive matter, ensuring that information is kept private or controlled.
gather string
To collect details for a story.
gonzo journalism
graf
An abbreviation for paragraph.
gutter
A vertical margin of white space where two pages meet, such as in the crease of a book or newspaper.
gutter journalism

== H ==
hard copy
Copy that is printed on physical paper, as opposed to soft copy, which exists in digital form.
hard news

Spot news; live and current news, especially stories covering serious events or mundane but important topics, as opposed to soft news and features.
headline

1. A word or short phrase displayed in large type at the top of a written article, designed to summarize the news contained within the article and/or attract the reader's attention and provoke them to read it. See also banner.
2. In broadcasting, a brief summary of an important story that will follow in full detail in the bulletin or main newscast. Closing headlines may also be used at the end of a bulletin.
heavies
An informal collective term for the broadcast or quality press, referring both to the physical weight of traditional printed newspapers and to their serious hard news content.
horse race journalism
hub
A way of combining and/or centralizing editorial functions designed to break down traditional demarcations within a news organization, permitting many editors of distinct journalistic departments to work more closely together than they would by running their own separate divisions.
human interest story
A news story or feature, or an angle on a story, that tends to emphasize the emotion, drama, tension, struggle, joy, despair, triumph, or tragedy of people's lives, usually by focusing on individual people and the effects that specific issues or events have on them, or by covering unusual and interesting aspects of people's lives which are not particularly significant to society as a whole. Human-interest stories are not restricted to soft news, and in fact are often used to interest an audience in hard news by exploring individual case studies as a means of illustrating wider trends or statistics.

== I ==
immediacy
The quality of an event or story that enables it to be reported as it is happening, or immediately after. All other things being equal, an unfolding or recent event is more likely than an older one to become news.
infotainment
insert
1. Additional text inserted into a story after it has been written, usually to provide additional details.
2. Any material placed between copy in a story.
3. Another term for audio used to illustrate a radio report.
interview
inverted pyramid
investigative journalism

Any technique used to unearth information that sources may want to hide.

== J ==
journalese
journalism
The production and distribution of reports on current events based on facts and supported with proof or evidence, and practiced by professional or amateur journalists. Common types of journalistic media include print, television, radio, and the Internet.
journalism culture
journalism ethics and standards
journalism sourcing
journalist
journalistic objectivity
jump line
A line of type at the bottom of an incomplete newspaper or magazine article which directs the reader to another page where the story is continued. The term may also refer to the line at the top of the continued article indicating the page from which it was continued, also called a from line. See also spill.

== K ==
kerning
A way of setting printed type so that the space between immediately adjacent characters is adjusted to appear uniform, at the same time reducing the amount of horizontal space they require.
kicker
1. An entertaining, amusing, or offbeat story used to balance a page or bulletin of otherwise serious news.
2. The first sentence or first few words of a story, set in larger type than the main body text, or the first word or two of a photo caption, set in uppercase type distinct from the rest of the caption text.
3. A strap above and slightly to the left of a main headline.
4. An ending that finishes a story or bulletin with a climax, surprise, or punchline. See also tailpiece.

== L ==
lead

leader
See editorial.
leading question
A question phrased in such a way as to draw out a specific answer desired by the questioner.
lede
See lead.
legacy media

The various types of mass media that dominated journalism before the emergence of personal computers and the Internet, particularly print media such as newspapers and magazines but also inclusive of radio, film, and television broadcasting. Legacy media is characterized by its distribution from centralized institutions via primarily one-way technologies to a generally anonymous audience, in contrast to the decentralized and often interactive nature of so-called new media.
letter to the editor
libel
liftout
lock-up

== M ==
man bites dog
mass media
masthead

The name of a newspaper presented in large print on its front page, typically incorporating a distinctive font or other form of graphic design to allow for instant recognition of the brand. The display of a publication's name and logo above the leader column or the top of a website homepage may also be called a masthead.
media bias
media blackout

The censorship or suppression of news related to a particular topic, especially in mass media. A media blackout may be voluntary, self-imposed by media outlets, or enforced by a government or other authority, with the purpose of preventing certain information from being reported to the public.
media democracy
media transparency
muckraking

== N ==
nameplate

narrowcasting
The dissemination of information to a specialized, niche, or narrowly defined target audience, rather than to a general one such as the public-at-large, in contrast to broadcasting. Target audiences may be defined by their shared demographic or common interests, or by being subscribers to a paid service.
news
news agency
A commercial organization that sells stories, photographs, or other journalistic products to the news media and which carries out reporting tasks on behalf of media clients. The Associated Press is an example.
news aggregator
news bureau
news cycle
The period of time that elapses before one news story or set of stories is replaced by another. Historically, news cycles have often been based on the publication deadlines of daily newspapers, typically lasting 24 hours, but for much of the public has continually decreased in duration with the emergence of radio, television, the Internet, and social media, such that cycles of definitive length have largely been supplanted by rolling news.
news desert

A rural or urban community or geographic area that receives little or no coverage by daily or nondaily newspapers or other news outlets. Residents in such places have severely limited access to timely, credible and comprehensive local news and information, which in turn weakens democracy at the grassroots level.
news embargo

A common journalistic practice in which sources such as government agencies, medical journals, publishers, or cultural organizations enter into an agreement with journalists or news outlets to share, provide, or release information in advance, on the condition that it not be published before a specified and mutually agreed-upon date and time.
news hole
The amount of space available daily for news in a newspaper, after accounting for the space used by advertisements, attributions, images, etc.
news leak
The deliberate, surreptitious, and unauthorized release of confidential information to news media. It also refers to the premature publication of information by a news outlet that has agreed to delay release under a news embargo. News leaks can occur from sources or through breaches of agreed-upon timing, potentially affecting public perception and accountability.
news media
news presenter

A person who reads or presents news during a news program on television, on the radio, or on the Internet. News presenters are often also working journalists, assisting in the collection of news material and providing commentary during the program.
news values
The qualities or criteria that journalists consider when assessing whether a story, event, development, or opinion is worthy of preparing and presenting as news. The process of determining what constitutes news may be complex and involve the weighing of a wide range of factors, including public interest, timeliness of the topic, reliability of the source, and the number of resources required to cover the story.
newscast
A news bulletin broadcast on radio or television, or a broadcast-style bulletin that can be viewed and/or listened to online.
newscaster
See news presenter.
newsdesk

The command center of a newsroom, presided over by a news editor and any deputies, from which reporters are given assignments and instructions on how to cover the news and to which they must in turn report. The term may also be used to refer to a virtual newsdesk, existing only online, rather than a physical desk.
newspaper
newsprint
A non-archival grade of paper on which newspapers and other publications and advertising material are commonly printed, consisting mainly of wood pulp and usually having an off-white cast and a soft, distinctive texture. It is favored by many daily broadsheets and wide-circulation publications because it is relatively lightweight, inexpensive, and durable and can accept simple four-color printing. It is often designed to be used in high-speed printing presses that print upon a continuous stream of paper rather than individual sheets.
newsreel
newsroom
newsworthy
Describing the extent to which some event, statement, observation, story, or other piece of information has the potential to become news; the condition of being sufficiently notable or relevant to be covered or presented by the news media. Notions of what is newsworthy can differ markedly between mainstream and alternative journalism, with much of the latter's emphasis often predicated on an explicit rejection of conventional news values.
noddy

A brief cut-away shot of a television reporter or interviewer nodding his or her head while listening to an interviewee's answer. Where there is only a single camera, noddies are often filmed after the interview ends and then edited into the finished piece to break up long shots during which only the interviewee is speaking.

== O ==
off the record
Information given by a source to a journalist on the (often implicit) understanding that, when reporting the information, the journalist will not attribute it to the source in a way that could allow readers to specifically identify the source. Contrast on the record.
off-diary
A story or publishable piece of information discovered through a journalist's own observation, investigation, initiative, or communication with contacts, as opposed to diary stories, which are generally predictable, publicly accessible events. Off-diary stories tend to be highly prized as they help to distinguish one news organization or brand from another.
on the record
Information given by a source to a journalist on the understanding that the journalist can publish it and openly and specifically attribute it to the source, as opposed to information shared "off the record", i.e. with the expectation that it will remain confidential and unattributed.
online journalism
See digital journalism.
op-ed
A short opinion piece in written prose, typically less than 1,000 words, that expresses a strong, focused personal or collective opinion on an issue of relevance to the target audience, commonly included as a regular feature or column in many newspapers, magazines, and online publications. Op-eds are distinct from editorials and leaders, which are written by the publication's own staff, and often provide a space for commentary from outside contributors.
open journalism
A type of journalism that promotes interaction and two-way conversations between the journalist and his or her audience, often accompanied especially by the idea that access to online journalism should not be restricted by paywalls.
open-source journalism
opinion journalism
A type of journalism that shares the journalist's commentary, analysis or opinion.
overnight
A story written late at night in order to be published in the afternoon newspapers of the following day.

== P ==
pack journalism
A practice in which multiple journalists representing different news organizations, even rival ones, act or work together with a sort of "pack mentality", reinforcing each other's views, approach, and/or actions while trying to provide coverage of the same story or event.
parachute journalism
The sudden emergence of national or international news organizations descending upon a location in order to cover a story rather than maintaining a permanent presence there or engaging local journalists to provide reporting. The term is often used to imply tactless efforts to obtain a desirable news story, in the absence of contextualizing information, respect for locals, or a true understanding of the issues involved.
paywall
periodical
Any publication for which new releases are published periodically, i.e. on a regularly recurring schedule, usually daily, weekly, monthly, quarterly, or annually. Print publications such as newspapers, magazines, trade journals, and academic journals are common examples; online magazines and other electronic-only publications may also be periodicals.
photojournalism
piece to camera (PTC)
A technique in film and television journalism in which a reporter or presenter is recorded (or broadcast live) looking at and speaking directly to the camera and thereby the viewing audience, often while present on location with an ostensibly relevant or symbolic location visible in the background. See also rooftop journalism.
pink-slime journalism
press
All forms of mass media considered collectively, especially print media such as newspapers and magazines but not necessarily excluding broadcast and online media; the journalism industry as a whole, or the entire body of journalists that produce and publish such media.
press censorship
press release
preventive journalism
public journalism
Another name for civic journalism or citizen journalism; or any form of journalism that seeks to promote the participation and engagement of citizens in democratic governments and civic structures, and/or to bemoan the absence of active involvement of the general public in conventional journalism and commercial mass media.
publication ban
puffery

Undue or exaggerated praise, especially that which serves only to inflate or "puff up" what is being described; an excessively positive and/or uncritical piece of journalism that comes across as a glorified press release, advertisement, or advertorial in a context where this is inappropriate, and which therefore violates standards of journalistic neutrality or objectivity.

== Q ==
quote
The use in a printed story or on television of the exact words spoken by a person, distinguished by quotation marks placed at the start and finish.

== R ==
radical journalism
Any form of journalism that articulates a critical perspective on society or eschews the established conventions of mainstream journalism, often found in alternative media and the underground press; the collective body of publications endorsing this style of journalism is sometimes referred to as the radical press.
rag-out
The reproduction of a section of a previously reported story, usually comprising the headline and intro, as a "cut-out" graphic alongside a follow-up story, in order to remind readers of the earlier coverage. A rag-out is often outlined with a jagged border to give the impression of it having been torn from the original page.
reach
A measure of the potential size of an audience for a particular publication, program, or website, as opposed to a measure of the actual number of people reading, watching, or listening to it.
recto
The right-hand page of a newspaper or periodical. Contrast verso.
reporters' privilege
Reporters Without Borders
retraction
A published correction (especially in print) that formally withdraws a false or offending piece of journalism and/or acknowledges that it was incorrectly or misleadingly reported.
Reuters
An international news agency founded in London in 1851 that provides news material in 16 languages and numerous multimedia formats to subscribing news media organizations worldwide.
right of reply

A standard journalistic practice whereby any person or organization who is criticized or accused of wrongdoing in a piece of journalism is offered the opportunity to comment publicly in the same venue where the criticism is intended to be published and in advance of publication. The opportunity may also be granted after publication, usually at the request of the person criticized. In some jurisdictions this constitutes a legal right, whereas in others it is simply a matter of editorial policy.
rolling news
News that is broadcast on a continuous basis rather than being confined to specific bulletins.
roundup
rowback
A story that attempts to correct a previous story without indicating that the prior story had been in error or without taking responsibility for the error.
running order
A list from first to last of which stories will feature in a broadcast news bulletin. Changes are sometimes made at the last minute, or even after the broadcast has begun.

== S ==
satirical journalism
scoop

An exclusive story, news item, or other piece of information, especially one of exceptional originality, importance, surprise, excitement, or secrecy, the details of which are known by or made available to only a single reporter or news organization, and of which no other reporter or organization has knowledge, or at least on which no one else has yet reported.
sensationalism
shield law
Any legislation designed to protect reporters' privilege by preventing a journalist from being compelled to reveal the identity of an anonymous source who has been promised confidentiality. The term is used primarily in the United States.
shirttail
A short, related story added to the end of a longer one.
slug
A working title given to a story as it proceeds through production but prior to final publication. Normally just one word, slugs are intended to be seen only by journalists and reporters in the office or studio.
soft copy
Copy that exists in digital form as computerized data, as opposed to hard copy, which is printed on a physical medium.
soft news
Any news that is not hard news, typically stories covering topics regarded as inconsequential or light-hearted, or which are reported more for their entertainment value and to balance somber and serious content than because of their importance to public knowledge.
sound bite

A brief clip or sample extracted from a longer audio recording of speech or music, particularly one used to promote, summarize, or exemplify the full-length piece. In journalism, sound bites commonly contain a short phrase or sentence that has been clipped by editorial staff in an attempt to succinctly capture what the speaker was trying to say in a longer interview; this same terseness also means sound bites are especially vulnerable to misrepresenting the longer form or being misunderstood by listeners.
source
An individual or organization from whom the information presented in a piece of journalism originates, or to whom a journalist can turn to help confirm the veracity of certain information. Although the majority of encounters between journalists and sources are routine and on the record, some sources may provide information only on an unattributable basis or on the condition of anonymity.
spiking
The act of withholding a story from publication, either temporarily or permanently, for editorial, political, or commercial reasons.
spill
spin
A particular angle or interpretation of information or events, especially one which deliberately ignores or contradicts other information which might undermine its own validity or otherwise fails to adhere to standards of objectivity; or the practice of pushing such a biased angle with the goal of influencing journalistic coverage and ultimately public opinion. Spin is thus a form of propaganda and generally has a negative connotation which implies willful distortion of the truth through the use of disingenuous, deceptive, or manipulative tactics. The term is most commonly applied to press officers working for politicians, though it may also be used more broadly to describe any effort to manage public relations.
splash
An exciting or widely interesting front-page story given prominence so that people will take notice of the publication in which it is printed.
staff writer
A person, often an intern, whom a publication such as a magazine employs to propose ideas for articles, write them and sometimes do clerical and research work.
standfirst
A sentence or two of text placed immediately beneath the headline but before the main body of an article, which serves to introduce or contextualize what follows. Standfirsts most commonly accompany feature stories and may also incorporate the writer's byline. See also go-last.
straight news
See hard news.
strap
streamer
See banner.
streeters
See vox pop.
stringer
A freelance journalist who contributes writing, photos, videos, or other content to a news or photo agency and is paid for each contribution rather than with a fixed salary.

== T ==
tabloid
tabloid journalism
tabloid television
tabloidization
tailpiece
teleprompter
thread
A series of Internet posts on a single topic.
topspin
An intangible quality that journalists are sometimes said to apply to their stories in order to make them appear more relevant or significant than they actually are. See also spin.
trade magazine

A magazine, newspaper, or other publication whose target audience is people who work in a particular trade, occupation, or industry. The collective name for this class of publications is the trade press.
typographical error

A mistake, such as a spelling error, made in the typing of printed or electronic material.

== U ==
underground press
United Press International (UPI)
An international news agency founded in 1907 and based in the United States that offers newswires, photographs, film, and audio services in English, Spanish, and Arabic to subscribing news media organizations worldwide.

== V ==
verso
The left-hand page of a newspaper or periodical. Contrast recto.
versioning
vox pop

A series of short interviews in which members of the public are stopped at random and asked questions by a reporter regarding their opinions on a particular issue or event in order to gauge approximate public sentiment about the issue or event. The term comes from the Latin vox populi, meaning "voice of the people".

== W ==
watchdog journalism
A form of investigative journalism in which journalists, authors or publishers of a news publication fact-check and interview political and public figures to increase accountability in democratic governance systems.
webcast
A media presentation distributed, either live or on demand, over the Internet using streaming media to distribute a single content source to many listeners or viewers simultaneously, i.e. "broadcasting" on the "web".
wire service

See news agency.
wob
White text on a black or dark-coloured background; an abbreviation of white on black.
wrap

== Y ==
yellow journalism

The use of flashy, eye-catching headlines and sensationalized exaggerations in order to attract an audience and increase sales.
yellow press
American newspapers that engage in yellow journalism.

== Z ==
zine

A non-commercial, non-professional, and non-official magazine-like publication or other alternative media product, often homemade, that is dedicated to specialized and often unconventional subject matter and written and produced by and for enthusiasts who share a common interest in the subject. A zine that is published online and distributed entirely by electronic means is called an ezine.

== See also ==
- Glossary of broadcasting terms
- Lists of journalists
- List of journalism awards
- Outline of journalism
