= BLUF (communication) =

Bottom line up front

Bottom Line Up Front, or BLUF, is the practice of beginning a message with its key information (the "bottom line"). This provides the reader with the most important information first. By extension, that information is also called a BLUF. It differs from an abstract or executive summary in that it is simpler and more concise, similar to a thesis statement, and it resembles the inverted pyramid practice in journalism and the so-called “deductive” presentation of information, in which conclusions precede the material that justifies them, in contrast to “inductive” presentation, which lays out arguments before the conclusions drawn from them.

Bottom Line Up Front is a standard in U.S. military communication whose aim is to make military messages precise and lucid. It differs from an older, more-traditional style in which conclusions and recommendations are included at the end, following the arguments and considerations of facts. The BLUF concept is not exclusive to writing since it can also be used in conversations and interviews.

== Purpose ==
BLUF is used for effective communication. BLUF aims to enable the receiver of a message to make faster decisions, especially for people who are busy, time-constrained, or overloaded with lots of information. BLUF helps manage a reader's load as most readers' priority is to get through all text or copy quickly and efficiently. This way, the reader can grasp the main idea or the whole thought of a write-up. The BLUF approach can help writers better organize their thoughts by starting with the big idea that they want to convey. For writers, announcing the BLUF convention while the article is in draft form might give the author a sense of clarity because the essay's purpose is stated early on, and having it written out can keep the writer on task.

BLUF communications place the main point of a message at the beginning and then follow it up with the context. In addition, it is used to enforce speed and clarity in delivering reports and emails. It is followed by essential background information that summarizes or enumerates the considerations (events or prior decisions) that led to the bottom line.

For example:

"BLUF: I need you to approve both the design and content of the attached flyer by noon on August 10.

This flyer is for an upcoming conference at which we are exhibiting. I have included information about the upcoming classes we are offering, our contact information, and a list of the services we offer."

By putting the bottom line up front, the example above gives the receiver what is expected of them and the task's level of priority.

== Origin ==
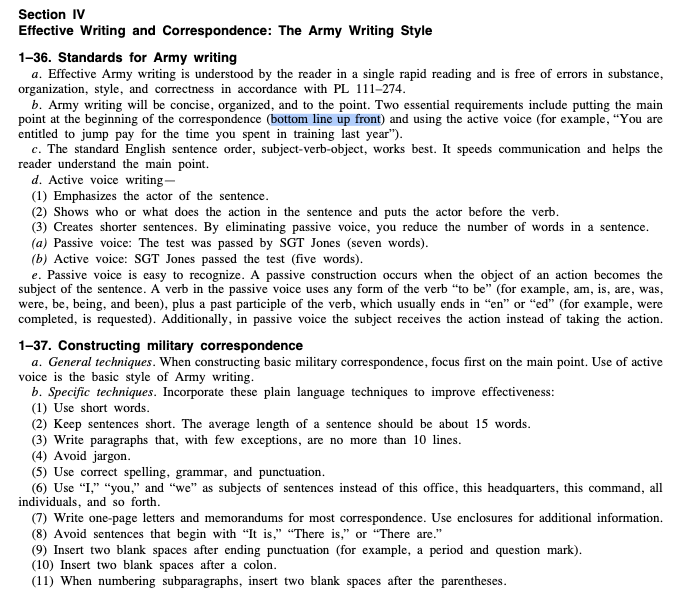
Bottom Line Up Front is highlighted in AR 25-50.

The phrase "bottom line up front" comes from a 100-page long document entitled Army Regulation 25–50: Information Management: Records Management: Preparing and Managing Correspondence. One of the standards for army writing for correspondences includes the use of BLUF, as cited in the following text:

Army writing will be concise, organized, and to the point. Two essential requirements include putting the main point at the beginning of the correspondence (bottom line up front) and using the active voice (for example, "You are entitled to jump pay for the time you spent in training last year").

In a 2017 guidance on how the U.S. Defense Department answers inquiries from Capitol Hill, Defense Secretary Jim Mattis expects the department to improve its communication with Congress "at every level". According to an August 22 memo from Capt. Hallock Mohler, Mattis' executive secretary, responses to congressional inquiries directed to the secretary or deputy secretary "must be completed within five calendar days". If more time is needed, "an interim response or reply will be sent indicating when to expect a final one. Mattis' guidance includes the following two directions: "Answer the question asked. Address the issue raised. Do not avoid the question or answer a different question. If you can't answer the question or address the issue, state why." And "Give members of Congress the Bottom Line Up Front; be direct and to the point using clear, concise, and straightforward language."

=== Use in the military ===
The various support units of the military also use the BLUF to convey their study and findings, as shown in the following abstract from a medical journal:

Bottom Line Up Front: In this perspective essay, ENS Ofir Nevo and Dr Laura Lambert briefly discuss the concept of an outward mindset and how they have applied it in the context of medical education. ENS Nevo shares his story of deciding to attend medical school at the Uniformed Services University, as part of his desire and commitment to serve others. Early on, the requirements of medical school created intense demands that began to disconnect him from the commitment and connection that first drew him to a medical career. ENS Nevo describes how an awareness of the choice of mindset helped him address these challenges and stay better connected to his purpose and calling. A case analysis by Lambert further explores how the awareness and practice of an outward mindset may help students, residents, and attendings see how they can improve their own well-being and connection to the people that brought them to medicine in the first place. Their experiences demonstrate how outward mindset principles can be a valuable tool for empowering students and physicians with a perspective that invites new solutions for the challenges of life and work.

Similarly, military lawyers use BLUF to summarize the key points of their reports:

Bottom line up front: no two states have identical national laws; even our understanding and application of the laws of International Humanitarian Law (IHL) (Geneva and Hague being the cornerstones) are not uniform. As judge advocates (JA) and legal advisors (LEGADs), we have a central role in identifying and understanding the relevant national positions within combined forces, the implications for the force, and advising how to minimize the operational or tactical impact, in order to ensure mission accomplishment.

Military officers also use short BLUF to convey a positive review, such as "Bottom line up front, you should read this book. That said, while I do recommend it, it is not without some serious issues." As well as a negative review, as follows:

Here's the bottom line up front: As physicist Wolfgang Pauli famously quipped, "This is not right. It isn't even wrong." Lt Col Robert Spalding's article "America's Two Air Forces" (Summer 2009) is deeply flawed in both premise and argument. Meaningful analysis of our aircraft requirements demands sound methodology and critical assessments that minimize internal biases. Unfortunately, the author falls far short on both counts. He describes a requirement for a bifurcated US Air Force equipped to meet the demands of peer-competitor threats and irregular warfare, and then asserts that current aircraft procurement plans will fail to meet either requirement. While there is some merit in his general assessment of roles and missions for his "Two Air Forces" (kudos to his discussion of irregular warfare), the analysis offered – which is inadequate and often specious – fails to support his conclusions. I will address his assertion that our Air Force should focus on a peer-competitor force structure.

==== Effective writing ====
Among its many rules, the now-rescinded DA pamphlet mandated structuring written staff products with the main point, or bottom line, at the beginning. The pamphlet said Army writers should give the bottom line up front, or BLUF, because "the greatest weakness in ineffective writing is that it doesn't quickly transmit a focused message." This is applicable not only in the military letters but also in writing emails, conversations, digital media, and many more.

== In writing ==
When writing a document for business and academic purposes, BLUF helps in writing the message and argumentation because it features prominently a main "what" and "so what". Stating the key judgment and significance up front sets up the argument, ensures the message is clear, and highlights why the reader should care about the document. In order to create reader-friendly prose, writers structure their paragraphs using BLUF format to better aid the reader's ability to recall the paragraph's main idea or content. BLUF-structured topic sentences are applicable when writing literature review, experimental results, and argumentative essays.

The BLUF style can also be routinely seen in executive summaries, reports, subject lines in e-mails, and abstracts in scholarly articles. The intention to place the bottom line at the onset is done because executives tend to focus on problem solving. It may be applied directly to the format of a résumé to prevent it being too long or wordy. In certain technical writing, BLUF may be considered desirable. It has also been advocated for scholarly articles. BLUF gives brevity in communication. This conciseness in communication comes from placing at the start the conclusion the summarized vital information and actions.

In journalistic writing, BLUF resembles the inverted pyramid structure for the latter also aims to serve the readers well by arranging the story elements in descending order of importance. Like the inverted pyramid structure in which the story's conclusion is already contained in its lead, writing in BLUF structure adheres to brevity and clarity so that readers can understand the message right away without sacrificing essential facts and without having to reread the message.

Army writing is effective when it is functional and satisfies the writer's and the intended readers' purposes effectively (adequate to accomplish a purpose; producing the intended or expected result). The BLUF model is designed to state upfront the purpose of the message and the required action to be taken. It is intended to respond quickly to the five Ws: who, what, where, when, and why. This kind of writing requires precision and direct statements that enforce fast and clear communications. Their subject lines use keywords in all caps to note the email's purpose, such as info (for informational purposes only), request (seeks permission or approval by the recipient), and action (the recipient must take some action.) The following example is an example of a BLUF message from the Air Force Handbook: "BLUF: Effective 29 October 2013, all Air Force Doctrine Documents (AFDDs) have been rescinded and replaced by core doctrine volumes and doctrine annexes." Another example comes from the U.S. offensive in Iraq in 2007: "The battle against al-Qa'eda in Diyala, Operation Arrowhead Ripper, is expected to last for weeks. The end state is to destroy the al-Qa'eda influences in this province and eliminate their threat against the people."

Along with the military professionals, analysts from the intelligence community also use the BLUF. Intelligence analysts often start an assessment with their bottom line up front. Their analytic reports are often drafted for busy policymakers possessing limited time for consumption of information and who therefore prefer the main points and judgments plainly presented at the beginning. For example, CIA Reports and Estimate 34-39's bottom-line-up-front judgment assessed Soviet intentions in Latin America, especially on what the Soviets would attempt:

(1) winning support of Soviet positions by exploiting certain patterns in Latin American life that facilitate the Communist approach and by taking advantage of specific incidents for propaganda purposes; (2) reducing the extent of Western Hemisphere solidarity by exploiting historical antagonisms, opposed intensely nationalistic sentiments, and conflicting national interests; (3) causing dissention between political factions in some countries (particularly Bolivia, Ecuador, Chile, Cuba, and Guatemala) to the point of impairing political stability and of shifting the balance of power; (4) taking direct military action by harassing sea lines of communication between the US and Latin American through submarine action and by landing sabotage agents and small commando parties; and (5) and most important, reducing Latin American economic support of the US in several important fields.

This assessment suggests that potential Soviet actions in Latin America may increase and do so nefariously. These types of BLUF judgments were discussed often at the U.S. National Security Council meetings after WWII up to the early 1950s.

Another example would be the Muslim insurgency in Mindanao, with the following BLUF: "Substantive resolution of a decades-long Muslim insurgency in Mindanao is unlikely anytime soon despite the signing of peace agreements between Manila and the separatist militants. Several entrenched obstacles to resolution suggest that the conflict will continue to drain the Philippines' scarce security resources, thus limiting its ability to pursue greater military cooperation with its security partners, and that parts of Mindanao will remain a haven for terrorists. Endemic poverty, corruption, powerful political opposition, factionalism, Manila's weakness in resources and capacity, and inflexibility on outcome hamper both sides."

The importance of BLUF in the intelligence community may be summarized as follows:

"These busy men and women rely on clear, concise, and accurate intelligence reporting to make daily decisions that affect U.S. national security, U.S. policies, and the lives of U.S. servicemen and -women. Arranging your intelligence reporting in the BLUF format helps them efficiently locate and comprehend the information they need."

In a Harvard Business Review article, Kabir Sehgal enumerated three main ways to format emails with military precision: (1) Subject with key words – Key words specify the nature in email (e.g. Action, Sign, Info, Decision, etc.); (2) Bottom Line Up Front (BLUF) – Emails should be short that basically answers the 5W's: who, what, when, where, and why; (3) Be Economical – short enough to understand and convey all the details. Using of Active voice is highly mandates rather than using passive voice."

It has been recommended that BLUF be used in writing policy papers and memos. This is because policymakers have short attention spans, given that they have much work to do. They may not appreciate lengthy prose and verbosity. They only want the essential information, so as not to get bogged down into details.

In writing policy papers and memos, military professionals, intelligence analysts, policy analysts, and the like need to include any second-order or third-order effect in their BLUF. The inclusion upfront of the result of the direct result of an action or change will entice the busy policymakers to read the whole memo or set it aside and read later. To illustrate, Title IX's college sports regulation makes sure women and men have the same rights. Women and men must be equal in both athletic scholarships, and the male-female ratio of athletes needs to match the school's student ratio. This is a first-order effect – more women get to play sports and receive scholarships. However, due to financial constraints, football is the only sport that makes money, and there is not a women's sport with an equivalent number of players. Hence, if the school wants to have a football team, they will also have to have five women's sports teams before adding another men's sport. A second-order effect is schools are (economically) forced to drop some of the less common men's sports teams. A third-order effect may be the sport loses popularity over time (wrestling is an example).

Applying this to the policy world, the two examples show this BLUF structure with a second-order effect: (1) The Philippine President will probably sign key legislation for the peace accord, but opposition elements are likely to challenge the law in court and thwart implementation. (2) An Islamic militant group is publicizing the terrorist activities of its supporters in the region as part of a media campaign to promote the group's network there, which encourages foreign fighters to travel to the region.

=== In conversation ===
In conversation, the BLUF model can be used to keep answers to questions or conversations concise and focused on the immediate topic, helping a person state the main point (such as in an interview). The BLUF approach helps top-level managers and senior military officials in decision-making, especially under severe time constraints, when faced with numerous issues within a given timeframe, and when communication of essential information is necessary in dealing with high-pressure situations.

BLUF is also useful when conversing at the organizational level. In the BLUF framework, for effective communication, it is necessary to identify the purpose of the message and share it with the audience (e.g., bosses, workers, and colleagues). In this framework, instead of reporting a detailed chronology of all the events that led up to this point, people first report the BLUF or conclusion, then explain the premises that led to the conclusion.

=== In digital communication ===
At present, 66% of consumers open their messages through mobile devices. Digital communication follows a different set of norms than direct mail, as emails require brevity and clarity of message content; hence, the BLUF framework is applicable to optimizing writing for mobile email consumption. An email patterned in BLUF declares the purpose of the email and action required. The subject of the email states exactly what the email is about. The body of the message should quickly answer the five Ws: who, what, where, when, and why. The first few sentences explain the purpose of the email and continue with supporting details. The message conveyed must be clear, whether simply for information or requiring action. This helps email recipients grasp and retain the message. Thus, an effective BLUF distills the most important information for the reader (receiver of the message).

The nature of BLUF writing is short and concise; hence, it helps reduce time, most especially in the decision-making process.

Below is an example of a traditional narrative email between colleagues who try to solve a problem:

Jim, Over the course of working on the new project, we've encountered some challenges working with the data. When we try to take table A from Database 1 and load it into Database 2, we are getting an error. So far, we've tried a few methods we found online here and here but nothing seems to work. Do you have any experience with this type of data transfer? If not do you know anyone else that has experience converting Oracle data to SQL Server?

As the example reflected, the sender's query came to an end. Further, no information on what kind of error, and even gave several links to the receiver instead of elaborating on the methods, and put a technical detail after asking for help.

In contrast, the BLUF email version is:

Jim, Do you know who can help us convert Oracle data to SQL Server? This is for the new project and we've encountered some challenges...

In the second message, the receiver already knows if he can help or he needs the assistance of another colleague. This will lead to a faster decision-making process.

The Persimmon Group had revealed that nearly 30% of office workdays are dedicated to reading and answering emails, and workers spend about 40% of their time in meetings. This has been rising due to the ongoing integration of technology into business processes. During the COVID-19 pandemic, the National Bureau of Economic Research found that the number of meetings per person increased by 13.5%. Employees spent about 11.5% less time in meetings during the post-lockdown period.

Beyond textual discussions, BLUF in digital communication also means conveying data. This includes making a presentation filled with facts and figures. A presentation can begin with a "BLUF slide"—a compelling visual image that encapsulates the overall thesis. Before presenting research data to marketers, for instance, presenters may show a timeline of a company's sales before and after it experienced a public relations crisis.

=== In planning and project management ===
The BLUF model can also be used in planning and management to ensure the purpose of plans are kept in mind, decision-maker support is more readily attainable, and impact may more easily and accurately be measured. It is considered as the best way for intelligence analysts to communicate with policymakers and commanders, who are often too busy to read and carefully digest every word of the intelligence products they rely upon to make decisions. Summarizing each paragraph at its beginning allows decision makers to quickly skim intelligence products without sacrificing clarity. Because materials that are not in the BLUF format—such as academic texts—may contain paragraphs with several important ideas located at the beginning, middle, or end, readers who skim these publications may inadvertently miss important information.

The BLUF approach to sales talk, for example, is also called the elevator speech. It entails that the messenger should be able to pitch a story as the elevator travels from one floor to another, which is approximately 30 seconds or less.

The following are some tips on using BLUF in project management:

- In order to synthesize the details well, there should be a great deal of topic mastery or familiarity of the whole story on the side of the messenger.
- For BLUF structured speech to work, all aspects of analysis must be understood such as "the critical success factors, the risks, the assumptions, and so on".
- Since BLUF is audience-centric, salient points must be addressed clearly while taking into consideration the needs and background of the listener.
- A clearly defined purpose must be kept in mind when structuring a speech in BLUF format: simple and measurable enough for a decision to be made possible.

A BLUF allows messengers to "think through relevant views and understand these ideas as our stakeholders see them".

=== In psychological assessment ===
BLUF has been used in one program to help to quickly assess the most pressing problem facing a patient.

The BLUF method is most useful as part of the cognitive-behavioral approaches in primary care to get the physician to understand information that may be beneficial for the patient. Communicating the results in a format that subjects can easily understand is paramount. In a medical team setting, each member values speed and brevity. Simon and Folen (2001) suggest using the bottom line up front (BLUF) format—the recommendation first, followed by the backup reasoning or rationale in clear and straightforward terms. A parallel process should be used with the patients. Building on earlier works, Conoley, Padula, Payton, and Daniels (1994), using archived footage of sessions, found that a patient was most likely to implement a recommended treatment if the following three conditions were matched: the recommendation needed to match the problem, should not be too difficult to follow [emphasis added], and should build on a patient's strengths. Patients being counseled tend to follow a treatment plan if, among other things, the recommendation is explained first and followed up with the justification, which are typical features of a BLUF. Expectations with the patients in carrying out a tailored therapy are likely when the benefits are explicitly stated immediately.

=== In healthcare communication ===
BLUF communication may also be used in healthcare.

Data shows that poor communication comprises 30 percent of all medical malpractice claims filed from 2009 to 2013. Thirty-seven percent of these claims were serious adverse events, such as debilitating conditions (e.g., extended hospital stay, loss of arms or limbs, psychological trauma), and death. These errors result from miscommunications among the members of the medical team, such as when coordinating the treatment plan for the patient. Moreover, these may lead to an increase in negative patient outcomes, and customer dissatisfaction. Thus, there is a need to practice effective communication to significantly avert medical errors and malpractice, and therefore contribute to best health outcomes.

One common practice in the healthcare setting is the "hand-off" procedure. During "hand-offs" or "handovers" (i.e., change of shift report), critical information about patient care is transferred between the outgoing and the incoming staff. Usually, this process takes place in limited time. Thus, the potential for communication gaps is very likely. One of the strategies to eliminate these gaps is the use of the bottom line up front (BLUF) approach to communication. The BLUF approach is used to customize the information to be transferred as well as the style of "handoff" to match the specific needs of patients. Additionally, BLUF communication may also be used during "code blue" (a medical emergency such as cardiac or respiratory arrest). Welu (2020) specified that BLUF fosters clarity of communication among members of a group during crisis or emergency situations. Furthermore, the BLUF approach may also be used during referrals of the condition of the patients to another healthcare worker or health service providers, as in the case of nurses to nurses, nurses to physicians, or junior physicians, to attending physicians. When documenting the treatment plan and the actual care interventions that were done to the patients, the BLUF approach may also be useful.

Providing information about the patient's condition together with the appropriate plans that are succinct and straight-to-the-point is vital to ensure that patients experience the best quality of healthcare and best medical outcome possible for them.

== See also ==
- TL;DR – "too long; didn't read"; Internet comment
