= Graphical abstract =

Visual equivalent of a written abstract

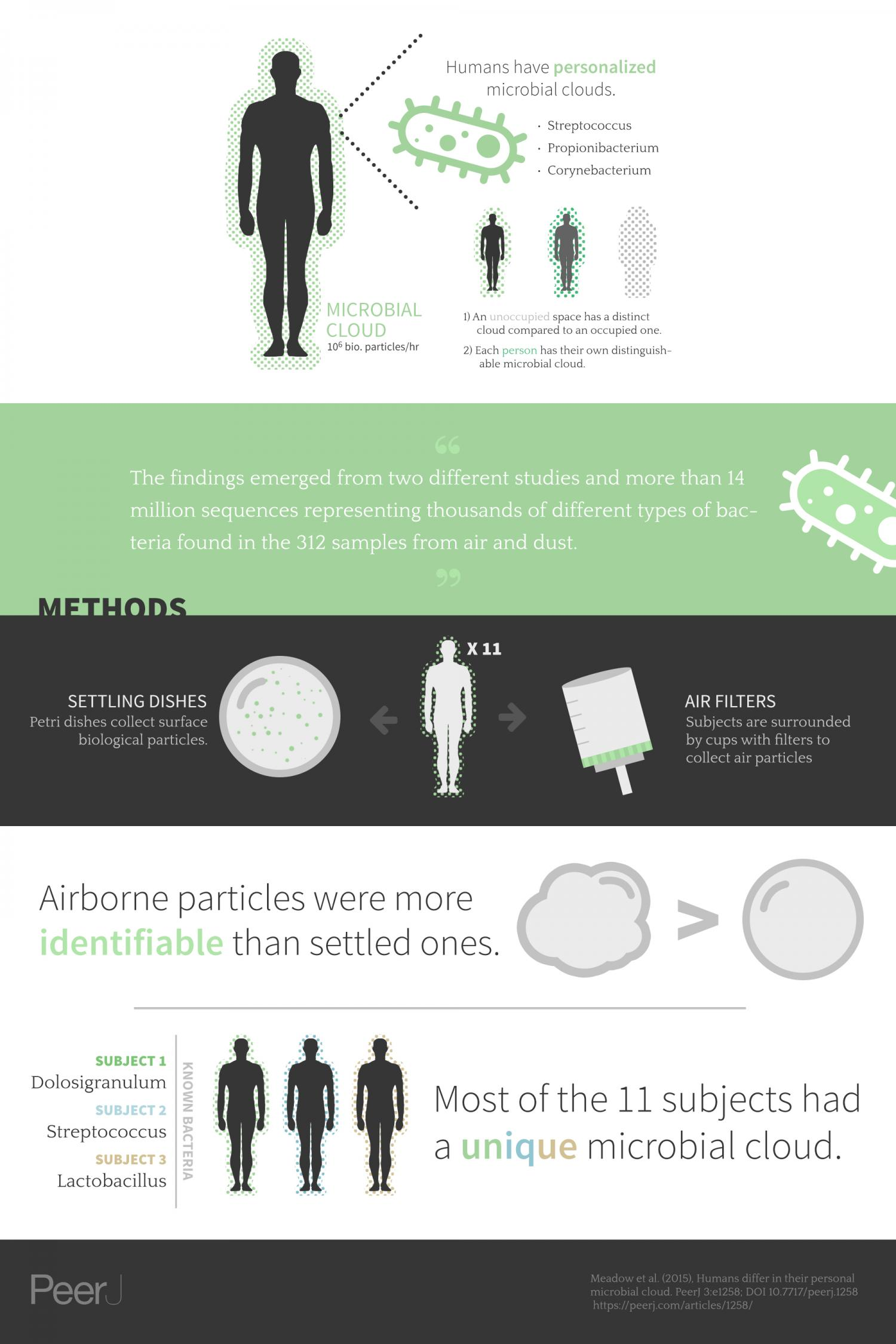
Infographic graphical abstract published in PeerJ

A graphical abstract (or visual abstract) is a graphical or visual equivalent of a written abstract. Graphical abstracts are a single image and are designed to help the reader to quickly gain an overview on a scholarly paper, research article, thesis or review: and to quickly ascertain the purpose and results of a given research, as well as the salient details of authors and journal. Graphical abstracts are intended to help facilitate online browsing, as well as help readers quickly identify which papers are relevant to their research interests. Like a video abstract, they are not intended to replace the original research paper, rather to help draw attention to it, increasing its readership. Instructions for designing a graphical abstract are available, e.g., "10 simple rules for designing graphical abstracts".

== Types ==
To the broader scientific community, graphical abstracts are a relatively new concept: therefore, there is no ubiquitous standard or style of formatting. Nevertheless, several distinct styles have emerged, which are largely a reflection of the intended audience.

=== Diagram ===
Graphical abstracts, consisting mainly of diagrams, have been utilized since the mid to late 1970s, primarily in the field of chemistry - due to the visual nature of the field. This type of graphical abstract is usually produced by the researchers themselves with the intended audience being other researchers who are already very familiar with the topic, usually using highly technical language and abbreviations with no background context.

=== Visual ===
The visual abstract is a style of graphical abstract first introduced in June 2016 by Annals of Surgery's Creative Editor Andrew Ibrahim, MD, from the Institute for Healthcare Policy & Innovation, Department of Surgery, University of Michigan. Visual abstracts have been developed with a consistent formatting style in mind and are intended to be produced rapidly and easily by the researcher, using Microsoft PowerPoint—though professionally designed visual abstracts do exist. The general format consists of a title, followed by one (or multiple) key findings, each with a text description and a visual icon, supported by data. So far, visual abstracts appear to be used exclusively by medical journals. The use of visual abstracts has been shown to increase overall engagement on social media, particularly among healthcare professionals.

=== Infographic ===
These graphical abstracts tend to feature text and graphics together in a more visually appealing way. Infographic-style abstracts were among the first to gain popularity in early 2015 – 2016 (shortly prior to visual abstracts), appearing in academic journals such as PeerJ and Elsevier and often accompanying their press releases to news media outlets such as Newsweek & VICE.

Infographic style graphical abstracts are usually made with advanced illustrating software, and are therefore usually professionally produced. The intended audience is not limited to any particular level of research training, and can be aimed at expert researchers or the general public. Given their emphasis on well-presented graphics, this style is usually intended to engage a broader reader audience than expert researchers.

=== Comic ===
The comic style of graphical abstract is the most accessible form of graphical abstract. This style uses humor and illustrations to convey the research findings in a fun and more light-hearted way. It is therefore a popular style when aiming to engage the largest public audience.

== Evidence of effectiveness ==
There are relatively few studies investigating the efficacy of graphical abstracts at increasing publication impact.

Some studies have focused specifically on the impact of using visual abstracts. One study revealed that, relative to tweets without a visual abstract, tweets with a visual abstract produced a 7.7-fold increase in Twitter impressions, an 8.4-fold increase in retweets, and resulted in a 2.7-fold increase in article visits.

However, a study in 2016 compared publications with or without graphical abstracts published in Molecules between March 2014 and March 2015, and found no apparent benefit of including graphical abstracts with the published manuscripts. Manuscripts published without a graphical abstract performed significantly better in terms of PDF downloads, abstract views, and total citations than manuscripts with a graphical abstract. This appears to be the only empirical study of its kind, testing the effectiveness of graphical abstracts, and further studies that are not limited to one journal and one year of publications, would be useful in further establishing whether or not graphical abstracts are effective at increasing publication impact.

== Applications ==
- Conferences
- Blog
- Grant application
- In the search results (e.g. ScienceDirect), together with the paper's title and list of authors.
- Job application
- Media release
- Online page of your journal article (for the journals that allow it)
- Online Table of Contents on the journal website (example)
- Personal/lab webpage
- Public lectures and community engagement events
- Social media (Twitter, Facebook, Instagram, LinkedIn, YouTube)
- Within a scientific manuscript (together with the title and abstract/summary)
- Graphical abstract maker with AI
