= Hezhang walnut =

Variety of tree

- Genus: Juglans
- Species: Juglans regia

Hezhang walnut (Chinese: 赫章核桃) is a Chinese variety native to Hezhang County, Bijie City, Guizhou Province. It has a long history of cultivation in China. This plant has simple appearance, well-proportioned shape and smooth shell surface. Its average transverse diameter is 35 mm, the average fruit weight is 38 grams, and the largest single fruit weight is 80 grams. The shell is thin, the fruit is easy to take the kernel, the kernel is full, and the color is bright.
