= Nutshell (disambiguation) =

A nutshell is the outer shell of a nut.

Nutshell may also refer to:

- Nut graph, a nutshell paragraph explaining the context of a story
- Nutshell (program), a data engine in the early 1980s, succeeded by FileMaker
- Nutshell (band), a folk group from Great Britain
- Nutshell (novel), a 2016 novel by English author Ian McEwan
- "Nutshell" (song), a song by Alice in Chains
- The Nutshell, a pub in Bury St Edmunds, Suffolk, England
- "The Nutshell" (The Avengers), a television episode
- Nutshell studies, dollhouse style dioramas of death scenes
