= In a Nutshell (disambiguation) =

In a Nutshell is a 1916 musical suite by Percy Grainger.

In a Nutshell may also refer to:

- In a Nutshell (album), a 2007 album by Pelle Carlberg
- Kurzgesagt, a German educational YouTube channel, also known as In a Nutshell

== See also ==
- Nutshell (disambiguation)
