= Yecheng walnut =

Variety of tree

- Genus: Juglans
- Species: Juglans regia

Yecheng walnut (Chinese: 叶城核桃) is a Chinese variety native to Yecheng County, Xinjiang Uygur Autonomous Region. Under the nourishment of the Yarkant River, the plant's heritage has flourished for thousands of years.

This plant has large fruit, thin shell and smooth peel. The appearance of the nut is light and smooth. The shell is 0.86-1.23 mm thin. The average single fruit is more than 10 grams. It is easy to take the whole kernels, its kernels are full and the color is yellow and white.

Walnut processing has recently become a minor industry in Yecheng County, and has created income for many struggling families. Since 2020, the price for a kilogram has increased by 0.5 yuan.
