= Lead paragraph =

Opening paragraph of an article, chapter, or other written work

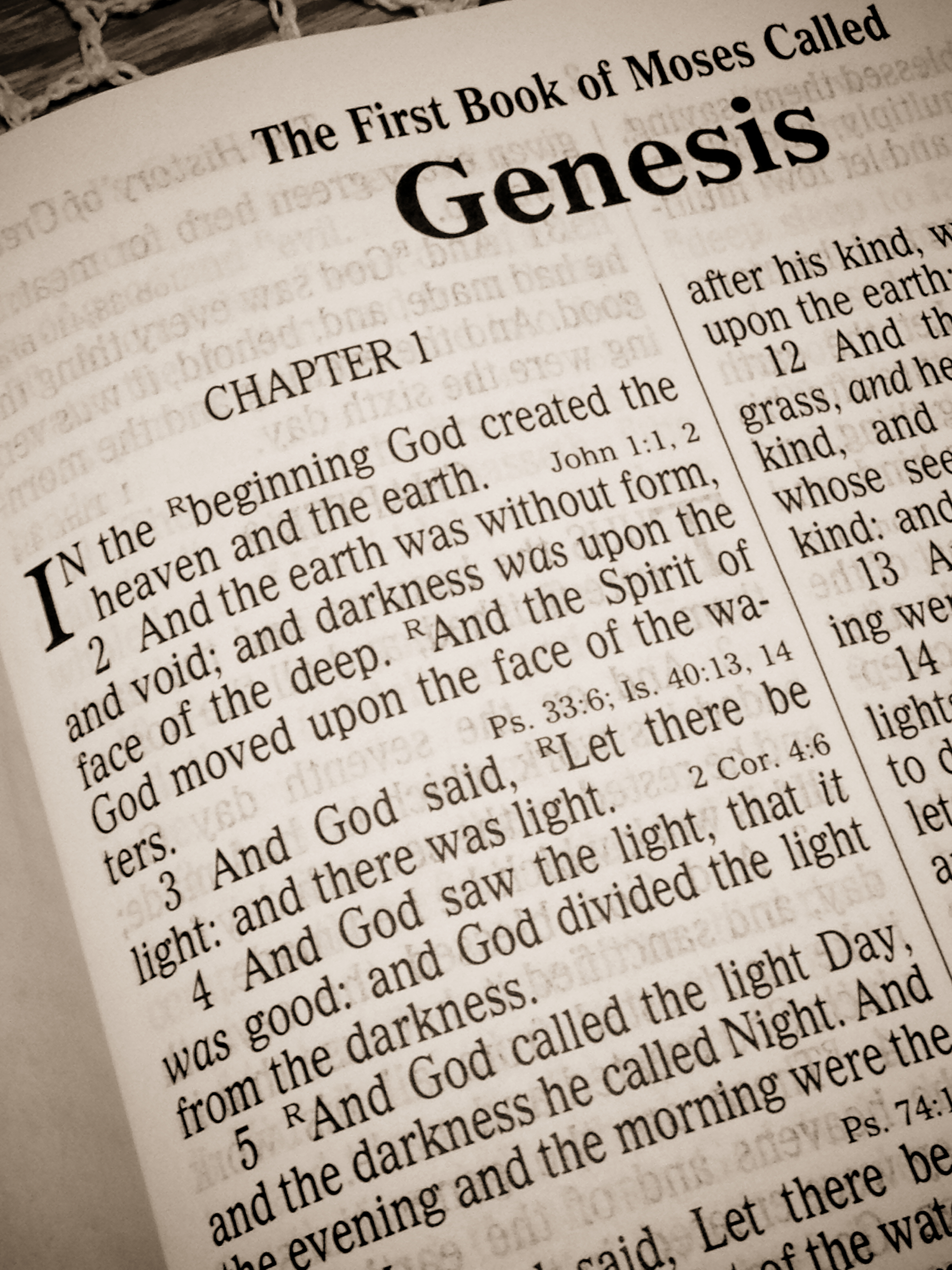
A picture of the opening (lead) to the King James Bible

A lead paragraph (sometimes shortened to lead; in the United States sometimes spelled lede) is the opening paragraph of an article, book chapter, or other written work that summarizes its main ideas. Styles vary widely among the different types and genres of publications, from journalistic news-style leads to a more encyclopedic variety.

== Types of leads ==
- Journalistic leads emphasize grabbing the attention of the reader. In journalism, the failure to mention the most important, interesting or attention-grabbing elements of a story in the first paragraph is sometimes called "burying the lead". Most standard news leads include brief answers to the questions of who, what, why, when, where, and how the key event in the story took place. In newspaper writing, the first paragraph that summarizes or introduces the story is also called the "blurb paragraph", "teaser text" or, in the United Kingdom, the "standfirst".
- Encyclopedic leads tend to define the subject matter as well as emphasize highlights and primary points of an article.
- Features and general articles in magazines tend to be somewhere between journalistic and encyclopedic in style and often lack a distinct lead paragraph entirely.

Leads vary enormously in length, intent, and content depending on the genre of the piece.

== Other introductions ==
In journalism, there is the concept of an introductory or summary line or brief paragraph, located immediately above or below the headline, and typographically distinct from the body of the article. This can be referred to by a variety of terms, including: the standfirst (UK), kicker (US), bank head(line), deck, dek, or subhead (US). A foreword is a piece of writing sometimes placed at the beginning of a book or other piece of literature, written by someone other than the author to honour or bring credibility to the work, unlike the preface, written by the author, which includes the purpose and scope of the work.

== Spelling ==
The term is sometimes spelled "lede". The Oxford English Dictionary suggests this arose as an intentional misspelling of "lead", "in order to distinguish the word's use in instructions to printers from printable text", similarly to "hed" for "head(line)" and "dek" for "deck". Some sources suggest the altered spelling was intended to distinguish from the use of "lead" metal strips of various thickness used to separate lines of type in 20th century typesetting. However, the spelling "lede" first appears in journalism manuals only in the 1980s, well after lead typesetting's heyday. The earliest appearance of "lede" cited by the OED is 1951. According to Grammarist, "lede" is "mainly journalism jargon".

== See also ==
- Abstract (summary)
- Editorial
- Introduction (writing)
- Inverted pyramid (journalism)
- Nut graph
- Opening sentence
