= News style =

Prose style used for news reporting

News style, journalistic style, or news-writing style is the prose style used in journalism, such as newspapers, radio, and broadcast news. News writing attempts to answer all the basic questions about any particular event—who, what, when, where, and why (the Five Ws) and often how—at the opening of the article.

This form of structure is sometimes called the "inverted pyramid", to refer to the decreasing importance of information in subsequent paragraphs. News stories also contain at least one of the following important characteristics relative to the intended audience: proximity, prominence, timeliness, human interest, oddity, or consequence. The related term journalese is sometimes used, usually pejoratively, to refer to news-style writing. Another is headlinese.

== Overview ==
Newspapers generally adhere to an expository writing style. In its most ideal form, news writing strives to be intelligible to the majority of readers, engaging, and succinct. Within these limits, news stories also aim to be comprehensive. However, other factors are involved, some stylistic and some derived from the media form.

Among the larger and more respected newspapers, fairness and balance are a major factor in presenting information. Commentary is usually confined to a separate section, though each paper may have a different overall slant. Editorial policies dictate the use of adjectives, euphemisms, and idioms. Newspapers with an international audience, for example, tend to use a more formal style of writing.

The specific choices made by a news outlet's editor or editorial board are often collected in a style guide; common style guides include the AP Stylebook and the US News Style Book. The main goals of news writing can be summarized by the ABCs of journalism: accuracy, brevity, and clarity.

== Terms and structure ==
Journalistic prose is explicit and precise and tries not to rely on jargon. As a rule, journalists will not use a long word when a short one will do. They use subject-verb-object construction and vivid, active prose (see Grammar). They offer anecdotes and examples, and they rarely depend on generalizations or abstract ideas. Because journalists prioritize clarity and precision over prose, they will often opt to use the same word more than once in a paragraph if it reduces even the slightest possibility of confusion.

=== Headline ===
The headline (also heading, head or title, or hed in journalism jargon) of a story is typically a complete sentence (e.g., "Pilot Flies Below Bridges to Save Divers"), often with auxiliary verbs and articles removed (e.g., "Remains at Colorado camp linked to missing Chicago man"). However, headlines sometimes omit the subject (e.g., "Jumps From Boat, Catches in Wheel") or verb (e.g., "Cat woman lucky").

=== Subhead ===
A subhead (also subhed, sub-headline, subheading, subtitle, deck or dek) can be either a subordinate title under the main headline, or the heading of a subsection of the article. It is a heading that precedes the main text, or a group of paragraphs of the main text. It helps encapsulate the entire piece, or informs the reader of the topic of part of it. Long or complex articles often have more than one subheading. Subheads are thus one type of entry point that help readers make choices, such as where to begin (or stop) reading.

=== Billboard ===
An article billboard is capsule summary text, often just one sentence or fragment, which is put into a sidebar or text box (reminiscent of an outdoor billboard) on the same page to grab the reader's attention as they are flipping through the pages to encourage them to stop and read that article. When it consists of a (sometimes compressed) sample of the text of the article, it is known as a call-out or callout, and when it consists of a quotation (e.g. of an article subject, informant, or interviewee), it is referred to as a pulled quotation or pull quote. Additional billboards of any of these types may appear later in the article (especially on subsequent pages) to entice further reading. Journalistic websites sometimes use animation techniques to swap one billboard for another (e.g. a slide of a call-out may be replaced by a photo with pull quote after some short time has elapsed). Such billboards are also used as pointers to the article in other sections of the publication or site, or as advertisements for the piece in other publication or sites.

=== Lead (lede) ===
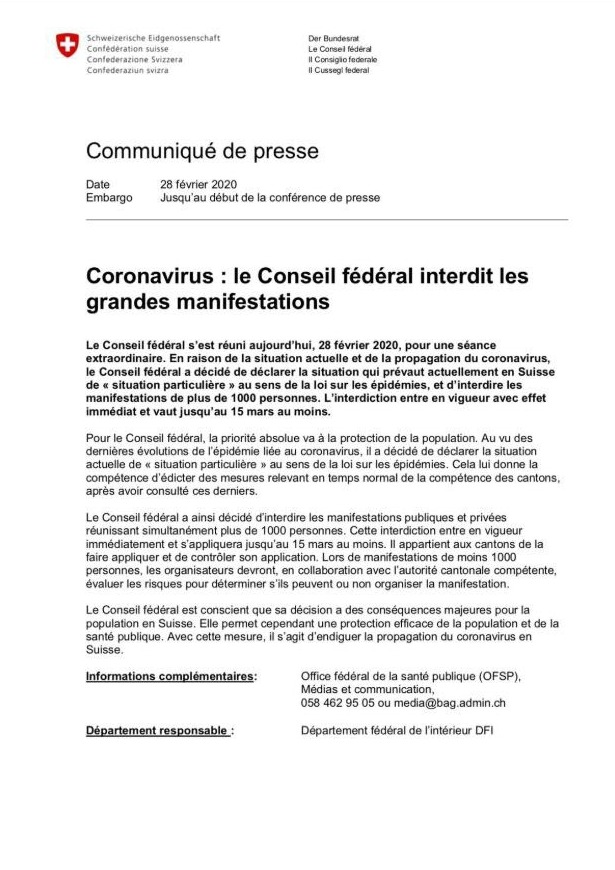
Press release of the Swiss government. Typical structure with title, lead paragraph (summary in bold), other paragraphs (details) and contact information.

The most important structural element of a story is the lead (also intro or lede in journalism jargon), comprising the story's first, or leading, sentence or possibly two. The lead almost always forms its own paragraph. The spelling lede (/ˈliːd/, from Early Modern English) is also used in American English, originally to avoid confusion with the printing press type formerly made from the metal lead or the related typographical term "leading".

Charnley states that "an effective lead is a brief, sharp statement of the story's essential facts". The lead is normally a single sentence, is ideally 20–25 words in length, and must balance the ideal of maximum information conveyed against the constraint of the unreadability of a long sentence. This makes writing a lead an optimization problem, in which the goal is to articulate the most encompassing and interesting statement that a writer can make in one sentence, given the material with which he or she has to work. While a rule of thumb says the lead should answer most or all of the five Ws, few leads can fit all of these.

Article leads are sometimes categorized into hard leads and soft leads. A hard lead aims to provide a comprehensive thesis which tells the reader what the article will cover. A soft lead introduces the topic in a more creative, attention-seeking fashion, and is usually followed by a nutshell paragraph (or nut graf), a brief summary of facts.

Example of a hard-lead paragraph
NASA is proposing another space project. The agency's budget request, announced today, included a plan to send another mission to the Moon. This time the agency hopes to establish a long-term facility as a jumping-off point for other space adventures. The budget requests approximately $10 billion for the project.

Example of a soft-lead sentence
Humans will be going to the Moon again. The NASA announcement came as the agency requested $10 billion of appropriations for the project.

An "off-lead" is the second most important front page news of the day. The off-lead appears either in the top left corner, or directly below the lead on the right. To "bury the lead" is to begin the article with background information or details of secondary importance to the readers, forcing them to read more deeply into an article than they should have to in order to discover the essential points. It is a common mistake in press releases, but a characteristic of an academic writing style, where its downsides are often mitigated by the inclusion of an abstract at the start of an article.

=== Nutshell paragraph ===
A nutshell paragraph (also simply nutshell, or nut 'graph, nut graf, nutgraf, etc., in journalism jargon) is a brief paragraph (occasionally there can be more than one) that summarizes the news value of the story, sometimes bullet-pointed and/or set off in a box. Nut-shell paragraphs are used particularly in feature articles.

=== Paragraphs ===
Paragraphs (shortened as 'graphs, graphs, grafs or pars in journalistic jargon) form the bulk of an article. Common usage is that one or two sentences each form their own paragraph.

=== Inverted pyramid structure ===
Journalists usually describe the organization or structure of a news story as an inverted pyramid. The essential and most interesting elements of a story are put at the beginning, with supporting information following in order of diminishing importance. This structure enables readers to stop reading at any point and still come away with the essence of a story. It allows people to explore a topic to only the depth that their curiosity takes them, and without the imposition of details or nuances that they could consider irrelevant, but still making that information available to more interested readers.

The inverted pyramid structure also enables articles to be trimmed to any arbitrary length during layout, to fit in the space available. Writers are often admonished "Don't bury the lead!" to ensure that they present the most important facts first, rather than requiring the reader to go through several paragraphs to find them. Some writers start their stories with the "1-2-3 lead", yet there are many kinds of lead available. This format invariably starts with a "Five Ws" opening paragraph (as described above), followed by an indirect quote that serves to support a major element of the first paragraph, and then a direct quote to support the indirect quote.

=== Kicker ===
A kicker can refer to multiple things:

- The last story in the news broadcast; a "happy" story to end the show.
- A short, catchy word or phrase accompanying a major headline, "intended to provoke interest in, editorialize about, or provide orientation"

== Feature style ==
News stories are not the only type of material that appear in newspapers and magazines. Longer articles, such as magazine cover articles and the pieces that lead the inside sections of a newspaper, are known as features. Feature articles differ from straight news in several ways. Foremost is the absence of a straight-news lead, most of the time. Instead of offering the essence of a story up front, feature writers may attempt to lure readers in.

While straight news stories always stay in third person point of view, it is common for a feature article to slip into first person. The journalist often details interactions with interview subjects, making the piece more personal. A feature's first paragraphs often relate an intriguing moment or event, as in an "anecdotal lead". From the particulars of a person or episode, its view quickly broadens to generalities about the story's subject.

The section that signals what a feature is about is called the nut graph or billboard. Billboards appear as the third or fourth paragraph from the top, and may be up to two paragraphs long. Unlike a lead, a billboard rarely gives everything away. It reflects the fact that feature writers aim to hold their readers' attention to the end, which requires engendering curiosity and offering a "payoff." Feature paragraphs tend to be longer than those of news stories, with smoother transitions between them. Feature writers use the active-verb construction and concrete explanations of straight news but often put more personality in their prose. Feature articles often close with a "kicker" rather than simply petering out.
