= Fast abstract =

A fast abstract, also extended abstract, is a short, lightly reviewed technical article that is usually presented with a short talk at a scientific conference. The length of the document is usually limited to 2 pages (including all text, figures, references and appendices), although some conferences may allow slightly longer articles. If the conference does not specify a document style, the standard double-column IEEE format is a common practice.

The concept of a "fast abstract" was created at the 28th Fault-Tolerant Computing Symposium, 1998, by Ram Chillarege, who was the program co-chair of the conference. They are meant to promote communication and discussion of subjects that have yet to be established or completed as research projects, and to provide a venue for reporting barely tested ideas, early experiments, or opinions. While informal discussions, stand-up talks, and round tables provide an avenue for such sharing, they lack the written record that is essential for academic progress. Fast abstracts aim to fill this gap. Since their inception, fast abstract sessions have been gradually adopted by several conferences, in some cases even being among the most attended sessions.

Due to their purpose and short length, fast abstracts do not require a full treatment of results as expected of a full paper published at a conference or journal. Even less formal publications such as working papers and technical reports are usually based on established research projects, and on the other hand these rarely are peer reviewed before publication, and there is no formal publishing procedures for such reports. Fast abstracts differ in these two aspects, and being (as the name indicates) fast to write and fast to review, they create a mechanism to promote a rich and timely exchange of experiences, and receive early feedback from the community.

Fast abstracts allow authors to:

- Report technical work at preliminary stages, and solicit early feedback
- Present radical opinions on controversial issues or open problems
- Introduce new issues to investigate
- Present experience obtained from practice

Fast abstract sessions can collect a diverse set of contributions, from young students initiating their research work, to senior researchers and distinguished members of the community. Furthermore, they allow industrial practitioners and academics who may not have been able to prepare full papers due to time and work pressure, but nevertheless seek an opportunity to engage with the community, to exchange their ideas and solutions, as well as technical problems and practical experience.

== See also ==
- Abstract (summary)
