= TL;DR =

"too long; didn't read"; Internet comment

TL;DR or tl;dr, short for "too long; didn't read", is Internet slang, often used to introduce a summary of an online post or news article. It is also used as an informal interjection, commenting that a block of text has been ignored due to its length.

== History ==
The phrase dates from at least 2002. According to the Oxford English Dictionary, its earliest known use was in a 2002 message posted on the Usenet newsgroup rec.games.video.nintendo. In 2009, the term appeared in Mo' Urban Dictionary: Ridonkulous Street Slang Defined, a publication based on online crowdsourced slang database Urban Dictionary. Also in 2009, it was listed as a slang acronym in David Pogue's tweet anthology World According to Twitter. The term was added to the now-defunct Oxford Dictionaries Online in 2013.

== See also ==
- Abstract
- Attention economy
- Attention span
- BLUF – bottom line up front
- Information overload
- Internet culture
