= Nut graph =

Opening paragraph of a news story

In the structure of written articles in journalism, the nut graph or nut graf (short for "nutshell paragraph") is a paragraph following the lede, or opening paragraph, that explains the context of the news or other story "in a nutshell". In the case of a two-paragraph extended lede, the nut graph follows those two, as needed; hence, the nut graph is generally the second or third paragraph following a journalistic lede.

In many news stories, the essential facts of a story are included in the lede, a story's opening paragraph of 2-3 sentences. Good ledes answer the Five Ws and H—who, what, when, where, why, and how—as quickly as possible, so as to not lose audience attention. Ledes crafted to capture attention in their brevity may fail to fully encompass the Five Ws and H, and generally cannot fully establish the context of the story; completing coverage of the story essentials and contextualizing it then becomes the purpose of the nut graph. As Zamith notes, the nut graph

contextualize[s] the most important facts of an article and provide[s] audiences with a clear understanding of that article’s angle...the lens through [which] the journalist approaches the central issue or topic examined... For example, [in] ...a story about a new town zoning ordinance, they could focus on the potential impact of the change on the town’s ‘character,’ or on the individuals who stand to gain or lose most... The nut gra[ph] tells audiences why the story is important and timely... explain[ing] where the story is coming from, where it is going, and what is at stake.

== See also ==
- Sound bite
