= Video abstract =

A video abstract is the motion picture equivalent of a written abstract. Usually not longer than 5 minutes, video abstracts help the viewer to get a quick overview on a scholarly paper, research article, thesis or review: and to quickly ascertain the purpose and results of a given research. They are not intended to replace the original research paper, rather to help draw attention to it, increasing its readership. The main difference between a video abstract and a short science video of any kind is that the former is associated with a scientific paper that has been accepted and published.

== Purpose and limitations ==
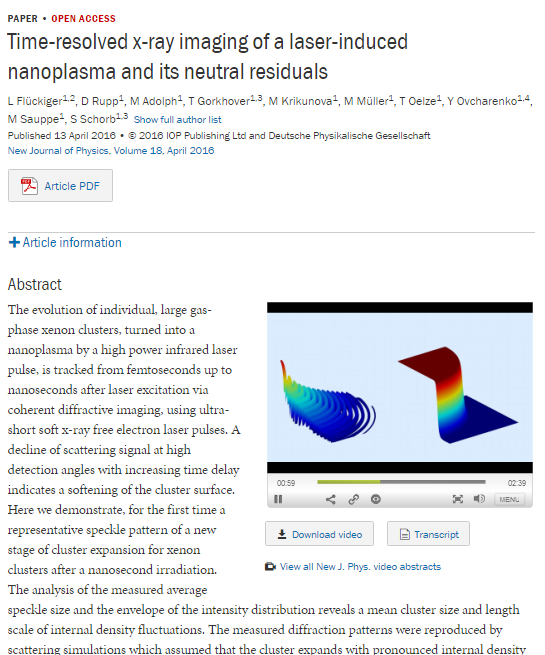
A video abstract accompanying a journal article. An example extracted from New Journal of Physics.

Video abstracts represent a new genre in science-communication. They can be defined as “peer-to-peer video summaries, three to five minutes long versions of academic papers” [Berkowitz, 2013] that “describe dynamic phenomena which are simply too complicated, too complex, too unusual, too full of information to do in words and two-dimensional pictures” [Whitesides, 2011]. Video abstracts provide a great deal of help to communicate “the background of a study, methods used, study results and potential implications through the use of images, audio, video clips, and texts” [Spicer, 2014]. Video abstracts seem to have a significant positive effect on the popularity and citation of the scientific paper they are associated with. According to a 2014 study, approximately 5% of the publications were supplied with video abstract, but in case of the most read publications, the proportion was significantly higher, between 25-30 %.

== Video abstract types ==
The use and significance of video abstracts are continually increasing especially on the field of natural sciences and engineering, due to the complexity of modern research in these areas and the need of a precise visualization of temporal components by using techniques such as zooming or stretching. In most cases video abstracts are produced by scientists themselves, on a low budget and in a relatively short period of time. To visualize their subjects, video abstract creators can choose from a wide variety of options: from simple whiteboard drawings, to screen-recordings, slide-shows and talking heads, the list is practically endless. Video abstracts show a great diversity not only in visuals-, but in their audience as well. Some videos are targeted to academic circles - they use a lot of scientific terms -, while others present for a wider audience, even to the general public. For scientists about to create video abstracts without any background in filmmaking, tutorials, workshops, videos and books provide a great deal of help. As an alternative, studios offer professional animated video abstract services.

== How to use a video abstract ==
- Conferences
- Blog
- Grant application
- Job application
- Media release
- Online page of your journal article (for the journals that allow it)
- Personal/lab webpage
- Public lectures and community engagement events
- Social media (Twitter, Facebook, Instagram, LinkedIn, YouTube)

== Examples ==
- A 3D Map of the Human Genome
- A Shocking New Discovery About How Electric Eels Hunt
- Carbon recovery dynamics following disturbance by selective logging in Amazonian forests
- Enhanced plasticity following stroke
- Oriented clonal cell dynamics enables accurate growth and shaping of vertebrate cartilage
- Social jetlag and its consequences
- Structural basis for subtype-specific inhibition of the P2X7 receptor
- Supranational banking rules - The hurdle race
- The Unemployment Rate: Just the Tip of the Iceberg

== Publishing ==
In addition to the scientific community, video abstracts concern publishers and librarians, too. Cell Press was among the first publishers to realize the potential of video abstracts and launched a channel back in 2009 to share video abstracts exclusively and also on YouTube. Now the channel features 400+ videos and viewing figures are over 100K and rising. Scientific journals, libraries and publishers rethink their workflows, in order to include an option for submitting video abstracts, analyze new ways to store these non-textual materials and investigate the uses of alternative ways to measure impact. On the other hand, librarians must be aware of the importance of new media and multimodal scholarship [SPICER, 2014]. That is, they should provide platforms to support these new media, index them properly and promote their accessibility and further usage.

The free platform STEMcognito provides a place to publish, share, discuss, and create video abstracts related to STEM research. With thousands of video abstracts on the site, there are also many examples of how to present research in this format.

The open-access video journal ″Latest Thinking″ offers video abstracts that are on average 10 minutes long and feature five chapters (research question, method, findings, relevance, outlook). ″Latest Thinking″ produces the abstracts in collaboration with the researchers who also perform as speakers in the videos. The video abstracts are published on the online journal’s platform under a CC-BY 4.0 license.

== Where to submit ==
List of publishers already accepting video abstracts.

- ACS Publications
- CellPress
- Copernicus Publications
- Dove Press
- Elsevier
- Emerald Group Publishing
- IOP Science
- VKONTE
- NRC Research Press
- STEMcognito
- Taylor & Francis
- Wiley
