= Executive summary =

Condensed version of a complex document

An executive summary (or management summary, sometimes also called speed read) is a short document or section of a document produced for business purposes. It summarizes a longer report or proposal or a group of related reports in such a way that readers can rapidly become acquainted with a large body of material without having to read it all. It usually contains a brief statement of the problem or proposal covered in the major document(s), background information, concise analysis and main conclusions. It is intended as an aid to decision-making by managers and has been described as the most important part of a business plan.

An executive summary was formerly known as a summary. It differs from an abstract in that an abstract will usually be shorter and is typically intended as an overview or orientation rather than being a condensed version of the full document. Abstracts are extensively used in academic research where the concept of the executive summary is not in common usage. "An abstract is a brief summarizing statement... read by parties who are trying to decide whether or not to read the main document", while "an executive summary, unlike an abstract, is a document in miniature that may be read in place of the longer document".

In common usage the term "executive summary" is a synonym for "summary" and has partially displaced that term.

== Structure ==
There is general agreement on the structure of an executive summary for business use - books and training courses emphasise similar points. Typically, an executive summary will:

- be approximately 5-10% of the length of the main report
- be written in language appropriate for the target audience
- consist of short, concise paragraphs
- begin with a summary
- be written in the same order as the main report
- only include material present in the main report
- make recommendations
- provide a justification
- have a conclusion
- be readable separately from the main report
- sometimes summarize more than one document

== Importance ==
Executive summaries are important as a communication tool in both academia and business. For example, members of Texas A&M University's Department of Agricultural Economics observe that "An executive summary is an initial interaction between the writers of the report and their target readers: decision makers, potential customers, and/or peers. A business leader’s decision to continue reading a certain report often depends on the impression the executive summary gives."

== Criticisms ==
It has been said that, by providing an easy digest of an often complex matter, an executive summary can lead policy makers and others to overlook important issues. Prof. Amanda Sinclair of the University of Melbourne has argued that this process is often active rather than passive. In one study, centred on globalization, she found that policy makers face "pressures to adopt a simple reading of complex issues" and "to depoliticise and universalize all sorts of differences". She claims that "all research was framed under pre-defined and generic headings, such as business case points. The partners' reports were supposed to look the same. The standardization of research occurred via vehicles such as executive summaries: 'executives only read the summaries' we were told". Similarly Colin Leys, writing in The Socialist Register, argues that executive summaries are used to present dumbed down arguments: "there is remarkably little adverse comment on the steep decline that has occurred since 1980 in the quality of government policy documents, whose level of argumentation and use of evidence is all too often inversely related to the quality of their presentation (in the style of corporate reports, complete with executive summaries and flashy graphics)."

== See also ==
- Abstract
- Business plan presentation formats
- Introduction (writing)
