= Inverted pyramid (journalism) =

Communication of major details before minor details

The inverted pyramid method visualised

The inverted pyramid is a metaphor used by journalists and other writers to illustrate how information should be prioritised and structured in prose (e.g., a news report). It is a common method for writing news stories and has wide adaptability to other kinds of texts, such as blogs, editorial columns and marketing factsheets. It is a way to communicate the basics about a topic in the initial sentences. The inverted pyramid is taught to mass communication and journalism students, and is systematically used in English-language media.

The inverted or upside-down pyramid can be thought of as a triangle pointing down. The widest part at the top represents the most substantial, interesting, and important information that the writer means to convey, illustrating that this kind of material should head the article, while the tapering lower portion illustrates that other material should follow in order of diminishing importance.

It is sometimes called a summary news lead style, or bottom line up front (BLUF). The opposite, the failure to mention the most important, interesting or attention-grabbing elements of a story in the opening paragraphs, is called burying the lead.

== Purpose ==
Other styles are also used in news writing, including the "anecdotal lead", which begins the story with an eye-catching tale or anecdote rather than the central facts; and the Q&A, or question-and-answer format. The inverted pyramid may also include a "hook" as a kind of prologue, typically a provocative quote, question, or image, to entice the reader into committing to reading the full story.

This format is valued for two reasons. First, readers can leave the story at any point and understand it, even if they do not have all the details. Second, it conducts readers through the details of the story by the end.

This system also means that information less vital to the reader's understanding comes later in the story, where it is easier to edit out for space or other reasons. This is called "cutting from the bottom." Rather than petering out, a story may end with a "kicker"—a conclusion, perhaps call to action—which comes after the pyramid. This is particularly common in feature style articles.

== History ==
Historians disagree about when the form was created. Many say the invention of the telegraph sparked its development by encouraging reporters to condense material, to reduce costs, or to hedge against the unreliability of the telegraph network. Studies of 19th-century news stories in American newspapers, however, suggest that the form spread several decades later than the telegraph, possibly because the reform era's social and educational forces encouraged factual reporting rather than more interpretive narrative styles.

Chip Scanlan's essay on the form includes this frequently cited example of telegraphic reporting:

This evening at about 9:30 p.m. at Ford's Theatre, the President, while sitting in his private box with Mrs. Lincoln, Mrs. Harris and Major Rathburn, was shot by an assassin, who suddenly entered the box and approached behind the President.

The assassin then leaped upon the stage, brandishing a large dagger or knife, and made his escape in the rear of the theatre.

The pistol ball entered the back of the President's head and penetrated nearly through the head. The wound is mortal.

The President has been insensible ever since it was inflicted, and is now dying.

About the same hour an assassin, whether the same or not, entered Mr. Seward's apartment and under pretense of having a prescription was shown to the Secretary's sick chamber. The assassin immediately rushed to the bed and inflicted two or three stabs on the chest and two on the face. It is hoped the wounds may not be mortal. My apprehension is that they will prove fatal.

The nurse alarmed Mr. Frederick Seward, who was in an adjoining rented room, and he hastened to the door of his father's room, when he met the assassin, who inflicted upon him one or more dangerous wounds. The recovery of Frederick Seward is doubtful.

It is not probable that the President will live through the night.

General Grant and his wife were advertised to be at the theatre...

— New York Herald, April 15, 1865

Who, when, where, why, what, and how are addressed in the first paragraph. As the article continues, the less important details are presented. An even more pyramid-conscious reporter or editor would move two additional details to the first two sentences: That the shot was to the head, and that it was expected to prove fatal. The transitional sentence about the Grants suggests that less-important facts are being added to the rest of the story.

Other news outlets such as the Associated Press did not use this format when covering the assassination, instead adopting a chronological organization.

== See also ==
- Glossary of journalism
- Spiral approach – Teaching technique
