= Nutshell =

Outer shell of a nut

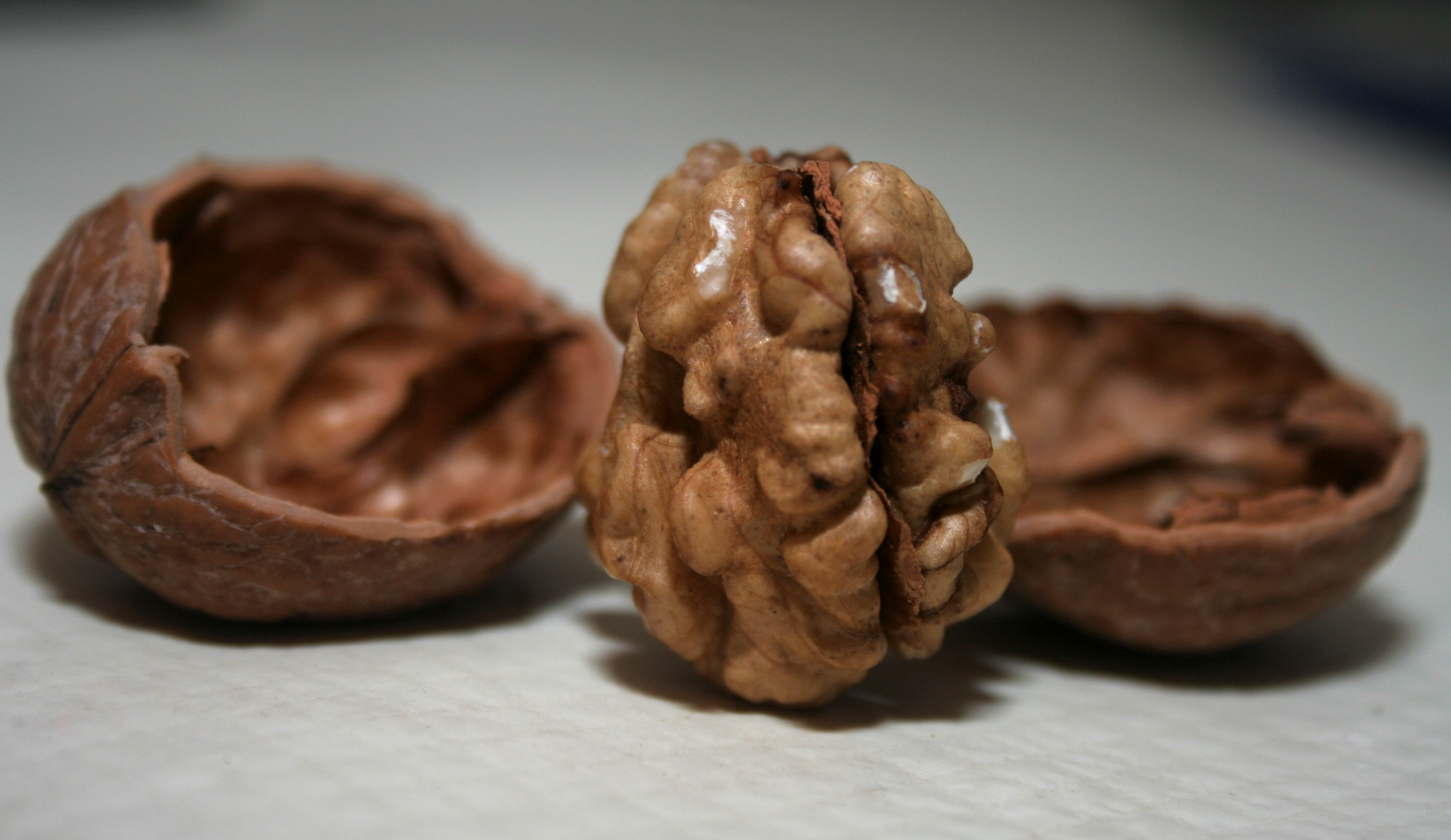
A walnut kernel and its shell

A nutshell is the outer shell of a nut. Most nutshells are inedible and are removed before eating the nut meat inside. It covers and protects the kernel, which may be edible.

== Usage ==
Most nutshells are useful to some extent, depending on the circumstances. Walnut shells can be used for cleaning and polishing, as a filler in dynamite, and as a paint thickening agent. Shells from pecans, almonds, Brazil nuts, acorns, and most other nuts are useful in composting. Their high porosity makes them also ideal in the production of activated carbon by pyrolysis. Shells can also be used as loose-fill packing material, to protect fragile items in shipping.

== Idiomatic usage ==
The expression "in a nutshell" (of a story, proof, etc.) means "in essence", metaphorically alluding to the fact that the essence of the nut – its edible part – is contained inside its shell. The expression further gave rise to the journalistic term nut graph, short for nutshell paragraph.

In Hamlet (Act 2, Scene 2) the title character exclaims: "O God, I could be bounded in a nutshell, and count myself a King of infinite space".

Pliny the Elder mentioned in the encyclopedic Naturalis historia a report by Cicero saying that a handwritten version of the Iliad by Homer would have fit in a nut[shell]: "in nuce inclusam Iliadem Homeri carmen in membrana scriptum tradi"
