= Five Ws =

Checklist used by journalists

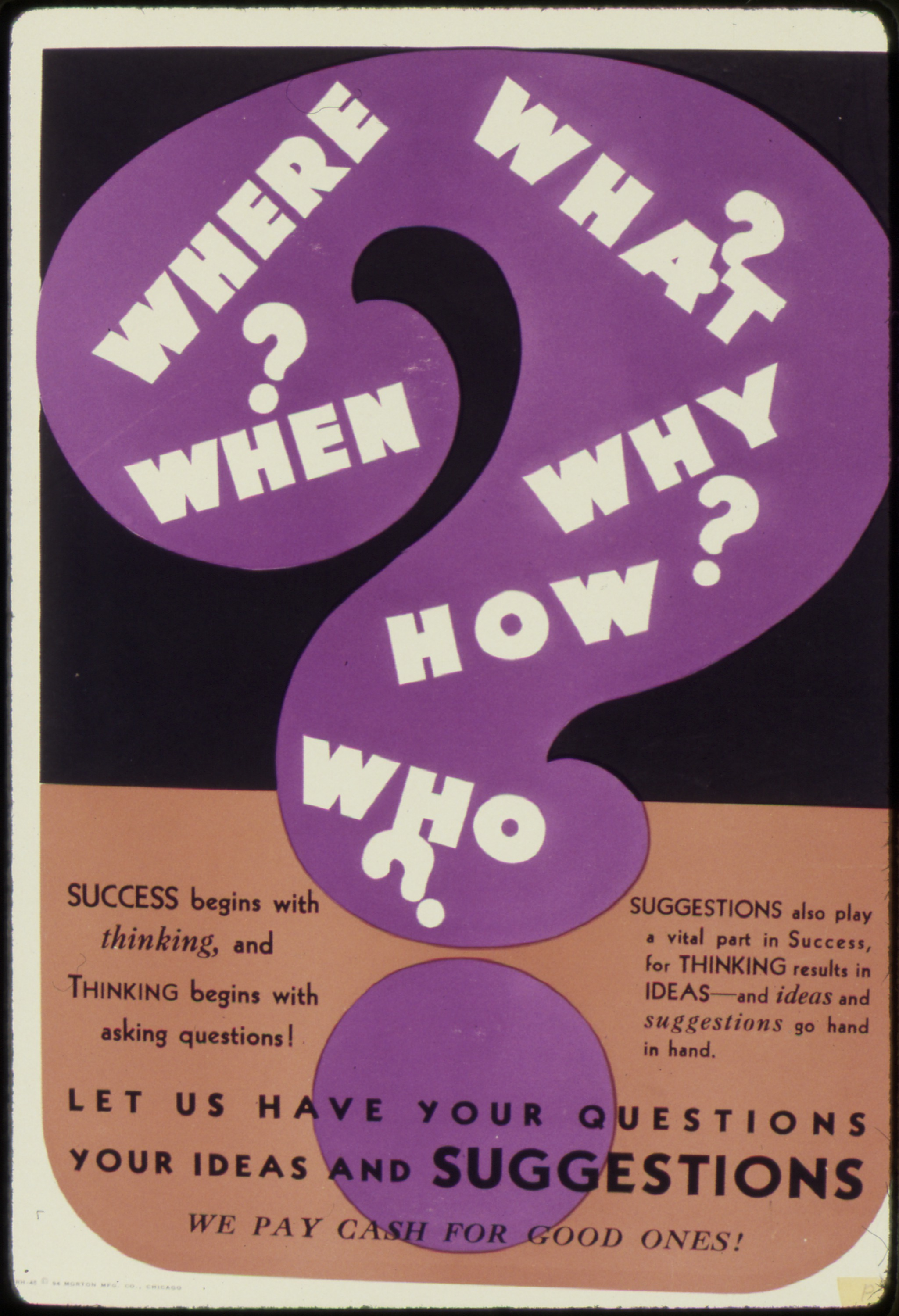
American government poster created during WWII featuring interrogatives

The Five Ws is a checklist used in journalism to ensure that the lead contains all the essential points of a story. As far back as 1913, reporters were taught that the lead should answer these questions about the situation being reported:

- Who?
- What?
- When?
- Where?
- Why?

Journalism students are taught that these are the fundamental five questions of newswriting. Reporters also use the "5 Ws" to guide research and interviews and to raise important ethical questions, such as "How do you know that?".

== Use outside of journalism ==
In England and Wales, the Five Ws are used in Key Stage 2 and Key Stage 3 lessons (ages 7–14). In data analytics, the Five Ws are used in the first stage of the BADIR to identify the business problem and its context in an analytics request.

Militaries use the five Ws to convey the details of tactical tasks within a broader mission as part of the five paragraph order.

== Origins in antiquity ==
The Five Ws are rooted in the seven questions used in ancient Greece to communicate stories clearly:

Although long attributed to Hermagoras of Temnos, in 2010, it was established that Aristotle's Nicomachean Ethics is in fact the source of the elements of circumstance or Septem Circumstantiae. Thomas Aquinas had much earlier acknowledged Aristotle as the originator of the elements of circumstances, providing a detailed commentary on Aristotle's system in his "Treatise on human acts" and specifically in part one of two Q7 "Of the Circumstances of Human Acts". Aquinas examines the concept of Aristotle's voluntary and involuntary action in his Summa Theologiae as well as a further set of questions about the elements of circumstance. Primarily, he asks "Whether a circumstance is an accident of a human act" (Article 1), "Whether Theologians should take note of the circumstances of human acts?" (Article 2), "Whether the circumstances are properly set forth (in Aristotle's) third book of Ethics" (Article 3) and "Whether the most important circumstances are 'Why' and 'In What the act consists'?" (Article 4).

For in acts we must take note of who did it, by what aids or instruments he did it (with), what he did, where he did it, why he did it, how and when he did it.

For Aristotle, the elements are used to distinguish voluntary or involuntary action, a crucial distinction for him. These elements of circumstances are used by Aristotle as a framework to describe and evaluate moral action in terms of What was or should be done, Who did it, How it was done, Where it happened, and most importantly for what reason (Why), and so on for all the other elements:

Therefore it is not a pointless endeavor to divide these circumstances by kind and number; (1) the Who, (2) the What, (3) around what place (Where) or (4) in which time something happens (When), and sometimes (5) with what, such as an instrument (With), (6) for the sake of what (Why), such as saving a life, and (7) the (How), such as gently or violently…And it seems that the most important circumstances are those just listed, including the Why.

For Aristotle, ignorance of any of these elements can imply involuntary action:

Thus, with ignorance as a possibility concerning all these things, that is, the circumstances of the act, the one who acts in ignorance of any of them seems to act involuntarily, and especially regarding the most important ones. And it seems that the most important circumstances are those just listed, including the Why

In the Politics, Aristotle illustrates why the elements are important in terms of human (moral) action:

I mean, for instance (a particular circumstance or movement or action), How could we advise the Athenians whether they should go to war or not, if we did not know their strength (How much), whether it was naval or military or both (What kind), and how great it is (How many), what their revenues amount to (With), Who their friends and enemies are (Who), what wars, too they have waged (What), and with what success; and so on.

Essentially, these elements of circumstances provide a theoretical framework that can be used to particularize, explain or predict any given set of circumstances of action. Hermagoras went so far as to claim that all hypotheses are derived from these seven circumstances:

In other words, no hypothetical question, or question involving particular persons and actions, can arise without reference to these circumstances, and no demonstration of such a question can be made without using them.

In any particular act or situation, one needs to interrogate these questions in order to determine the actual circumstances of the action.

It is necessary for students of virtue to differentiate between the Voluntary and Involuntary; such a distinction should even prove useful to the lawmaker for assigning honors and punishments.

This aspect is encapsulated by Aristotle in Rhetoric as forensic speech and is used to determine "The characters and circumstances which lead men to commit wrong, or make them the victims of wrong" to accuse or defend. It is this application of the elements of circumstances that was emphasised by latter rhetoricians.

=== Usage in rhetoric ===
Even though the classical origin of these questions as situated in ethics had long been lost, they have been a standard way of formulating or analyzing rhetorical questions since antiquity. The rhetor Hermagoras of Temnos, as quoted in pseudo-Augustine's De Rhetorica, applied Aristotle's "elements of circumstances" (μόρια περιστάσεως) as the loci of an issue:

Quis, quid, quando, ubi, cur, quem ad modum, quibus adminiculis.
(Who, what, when, where, why, in what way, by what means)

Aquinas also refers to the elements as used by Cicero in De Inventione (Chap. 24 DD1, 104) as:

Quis, quid, ubi, quibus auxiliis, cur, quomodo, quando.

Similarly, Quintilian discussed loci argumentorum, but did not put them in the form of questions.

Victorinus explained Cicero's application of the elements of circumstances by putting them into correspondence with Hermagoras questions 5 W's and an H :

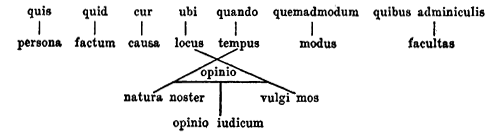
quis=persona; quid=factum; cur=causa; ubi=locus; quando=tempus; quemadmodum = modus; quib/adminiculis=facultas

Julius Victor also lists circumstances as questions.

Boethius "made the seven circumstances fundamental to the arts of prosecution and defense":

Quis, quid, cur, quomodo, ubi, quando, quibus auxiliis.
(Who, what, why, how, where, when, with what)

The question form was taken up again in the 12th century by Thierry of Chartres and John of Salisbury.

To administer suitable penance to sinners, the 21st canon of the Fourth Lateran Council (1215) enjoined confessors to investigate both sins and the circumstances of the sins. The question form was popular for guiding confessors, and it appeared in several different forms:

Quis, quid, ubi, per quos, quoties, cur, quomodo, quando.
Quis, quid, ubi, quibus auxiliis, cur, quomodo, quando.
Quis, quid, ubi, cum quo, quotiens, cur, quomodo, quando.
Quid, quis, ubi, quibus auxiliis, cur, quomodo, quando.
Quid, ubi, quare, quantum, conditio, quomodo, quando: adiuncto quoties.

The method of questions was also used for the systematic exegesis of a text.

In the 16th century, Thomas Wilson wrote in English verse:

Who, what, and where, by what helpe, and by whose:
Why, how, and when, doe many things disclose.

In the United States in the 19th century, William Cleaver Wilkinson popularized the "Three Ws" – What? Why? What of it? – as a method of Bible study in the 1880s, although he did not claim originality. This eventually became the "Five W's", but the application was rather different from that in journalism:

"What? Why? What of it?" is a plan of study of alliterative methods for the teacher emphasized by Professor W.C. Wilkinson not as original with himself but as of venerable authority. "It is, in fact," he says, "an almost immemorial orator's analysis. First the facts, next the proof of the facts, then the consequences of the facts. This analysis has often been expanded into one known as "The Five W's": "When? Where? Who? What? Why?" Hereby attention is called, in the study of any lesson: to the date of its incidents; to their place or locality; to the person speaking or spoken to, or to the persons introduced, in the narrative; to the incidents or statements of the text; and, finally, to the applications and uses of the lesson teachings.

The "Five W's" (and one H) were memorialized by Rudyard Kipling in his Just So Stories (1902), in which a poem, accompanying the tale of The Elephant's Child, opens with:

I keep six honest serving-men
(They taught me all I knew);
Their names are What and Why and When
And How and Where and Who.

By 1917, the "Five Ws" were being taught in high-school journalism classes, and by 1940, the tendency of journalists to address all of the "Five Ws" within the lead paragraph of an article was being characterized as old-fashioned and fallacious:

The old-fashioned lead of the five Ws and the H, crystallized largely by Pulitzer's "new journalism" and sanctified by the schools, is widely giving way to the much more supple and interesting feature lead, even on straight news stories.

All of you know about – and I hope all of you admit the fallacy of – the doctrine of the five Ws in the first sentence of the newspaper story.

Starting in the 2000s, the Five Ws were sometimes misattributed to Rudyard Kipling (referred to as "The Kipling Method"), especially in the management and quality literature, and contrasted with the five whys.

=== Etymology ===
In English, most of the interrogative words begin with the same letters, wh-; in Latin, most also begin with the same letters, qu-. This is not coincidental as they are cognates derived from the Proto-Indo-European interrogative pronoun root *k^{w}o-, reflected in Proto-Germanic as *χ^{w}a- or *kh^{w}a- and in Latin as qu-.

== See also ==
- Bury the lede – Prose style used for news reporting
- Five whys – Iterative interrogative technique
- Inverted pyramid (journalism) – Communication of major details before minor details
- Lasswell's model of communication – Early influential model of communication
- Lead (journalism) – Opening paragraph of an article, chapter, or other written work
- Means, motive, and opportunity – Applied science involving study of crime
- Cluedo – Game about establishing the basic facts of a crime
