= Abstract (summary) =

Brief summary of a research article

An abstract is a brief summary of a research article, thesis, review, conference proceeding, or any in-depth analysis of a particular subject and is often used to help the reader quickly ascertain the paper's purpose. When used, an abstract always appears at the beginning of a manuscript or typescript, acting as the point-of-entry for any given academic paper or patent application. Abstracting and indexing services for various academic disciplines are aimed at compiling a body of literature for that particular subject.

The terms précis or synopsis are used in some publications to refer to the same thing that other publications might call an "abstract". In management reports, an executive summary usually contains more information (and often more sensitive information) than the abstract does.

== Purpose and limitations ==
Academic literature uses the abstract to succinctly communicate complex research. An abstract may act as a stand-alone entity instead of a full paper. As such, an abstract is used by many organizations as the basis for selecting research that is proposed for presentation in the form of a poster, platform/oral presentation or workshop presentation at an academic conference. Most bibliographic databases only index abstracts rather than providing the entire text of the paper. Full texts of scientific papers must often be purchased because of copyright and/or publisher fees and therefore the abstract is a significant selling point for the reprint or electronic form of the full text.

The abstract can convey the main results and conclusions of a scientific article but the full text article must be consulted for details of the methodology, the full experimental results, and a critical discussion of the interpretations and conclusions. Abstracts are occasionally inconsistent with full reports. This has the potential to mislead clinicians who rely solely on the information present in the abstract without consulting the full report.

An abstract allows one to sift through copious numbers of papers for ones in which the researcher can have more confidence that they will be relevant to their research. Once papers are chosen based on the abstract, they must be read carefully to be evaluated for relevance.

It is generally agreed that one must not base reference citations on the abstract alone, but the content of an entire paper. This is because abstracts may not be fully representative of the full report or article. Therefore, basing reference citations solely on the information present in the abstract could be misleading.

According to the results of a study published in PLOS Medicine, the "exaggerated and inappropriate coverage of research findings in the news media" is ultimately related to inaccurately reporting or over-interpreting research results in many abstract conclusions. A study published in JAMA concluded that "inconsistencies in data between abstract and body and reporting of data and other information solely in the abstract are relatively common and that a simple educational intervention directed to the author is ineffective in reducing that frequency." Other "studies comparing the accuracy of information reported in a journal abstract with that reported in the text of the full publication have found claims that are inconsistent with, or missing from, the body of the full article."

According to the Modern Language Association, there are almost no circumstances in which it is acceptable to cite an abstract: "It only makes sense to cite an abstract if you are writing about the abstract as an abstract and not about the work it summarizes: for instance, if you are writing about different styles of writing abstracts used in the sciences and humanities."

== History ==
The history of abstracting dates back to the point when it was felt necessary to summarise the content of documents in order to make the information contained in them more accessible. In Mesopotamia during the early second millennium BCE, clay envelopes designed to protect enclosed cuneiform documents from tampering were inscribed either with the full text of the document or a summary. In the Greco-Roman world, many texts were abstracted: summaries of non-fiction works were known as epitomes, and in many cases the only information about works which have not survived to modernity comes from their epitomes which have survived. Similarly, the text of many ancient Greek and Roman plays commenced with a hypothesis which summed up the play's plot. Non-literary documents were also abstracted: the Tebtunis papyri found in the Ancient Egyptian town of Tebtunis contain abstracts of legal documents. During the Middle Ages, the pages of scholarly texts contained summaries of their contents as marginalia, as did some manuscripts of the Code of Justinian.

The use of abstracts to summarise science originates in the early 1800s, when the secretary of the Royal Society would record brief summaries of talks into the minutes of each meeting, which were referred to as 'abstracts'. The Royal Society abstracts from 1800 – 1837 were later collated and published in the society's journal Philosophical Transactions, with the first group appearing in 1832. These abstracts were generally one or more pages long. Other learned societies adopted similar practices. The Royal Astronomical Society (RAS) may have been the first to publish its abstracts: the Monthly Notices of the RAS launched in 1827, containing (among other things) abstracts of talks given at their monthly meetings; the full papers were published months or years later in the Memoirs of the RAS. The RAS abstracts were between one and three paragraphs long. In both cases, these early abstracts were written by the learned society, not the author of the paper. Perhaps the earliest example of an abstract published alongside the paper it summarises was the 1919 paper On the Irregularities of Motion of the Foucault Pendulum published in the Physical Review of the American Physical Society, which often published abstracts thereafter.

== Copyright by country ==
United States - Abstracts are protected under copyright law just as any other form of written speech is protected.

== Structure ==
Abstract is often expected to tell a complete story of the paper, as for most readers, abstract is the only part of the paper that will be read. It should allow the reader to give an elevator pitch of the full paper.

An academic abstract typically outlines four elements relevant to the completed work:

- The research focus (statement of the problem(s)/specific gap in existing research/research issue(s) addressed);
- The research methods (experimental research, case studies, questionnaires, etc) used to solve the problem;
- The major results/findings of the research; and
- The main conclusions and recommendations (i.e., how the work answers the proposed research problem).

It may also contain brief references, although some publications' standard style omits references from the abstract, reserving them for the article body (which, by definition, treats the same topics but in more depth).

Abstract length varies by discipline and publisher requirements. Typical length ranges from 100 to 500 words, but very rarely more than a page and occasionally just a few words. An abstract may or may not have the section title of "abstract" explicitly listed as an antecedent to content.

Sometimes, abstracts are sectioned logically as an overview of what appears in the paper, with any of the following subheadings: Background, Introduction, Objectives, Methods, Results, Discussion, Conclusions. Abstracts in which these subheadings are explicitly given are often called structured abstracts. Abstracts that comprise one paragraph (no explicit subheadings) are often called unstructured abstracts. Abstracts are important enough that IMRAD is even sometimes recast as AIMRAD.

== Abstract types ==
=== Informative ===
The informative abstract, also known as the complete abstract, is a compendious summary of a paper's substance and its background, purpose, methodology, results, and conclusion. Usually between 100 and 200 words, the informative abstract summarizes the paper's structure, its major topics and key points. A format for scientific short reports that is similar to an informative abstract has been proposed in recent years. Informative abstracts may be viewed as standalone documents.

=== Descriptive ===
The descriptive abstract, also known as the limited abstract or the indicative abstract, provides a description of what the paper covers without delving into its substance. A descriptive abstract is akin to a table of contents in paragraph form.

== Graphical abstracts ==
During the late 2000s, due to the influence of computer storage and retrieval systems such as the Internet, some scientific publications, primarily those published by Elsevier, started including graphical abstracts alongside the text abstracts. The graphic is intended to summarize or be an exemplar for the main thrust of the article. It is not intended to be as exhaustive a summary as the text abstract, rather it is supposed to indicate the type, scope, and technical coverage of the article at a glance. The use of graphical abstracts has been generally well received by the scientific community. Moreover, some journals also include video abstracts and animated abstracts made by the authors to easily explain their papers. Many scientific publishers currently encourage authors to supplement their articles with graphical abstracts, in the hope that such a convenient visual summary will facilitate readers with a clearer outline of papers that are of interest and will result in improved overall visibility of the respective publication. However, the validity of this assumption has not been thoroughly studied, and a recent study statistically comparing publications with or without graphical abstracts with regard to several output parameters reflecting visibility failed to demonstrate an effectiveness of graphical abstracts for attracting attention to scientific publications.

== Abstract quality assessment ==
Various methods can be used to evaluate abstract quality, e.g. rating by readers, checklists, and readability measures (such as Flesch Reading Ease).

== See also ==
- Abstract (law)
- Abstract management
- Academic conference
- Annotation
- Executive summary
- Fast abstract
- IMRAD – commonly used structure for academic journal articles and their abstracts
- List of academic databases and search engines
- Preface
- TL;DR
