= Journalistic objectivity =

Principle in journalism

Journalistic objectivity is a principle within the discussion of journalistic professionalism. Journalistic objectivity may refer to fairness, disinterestedness, factuality, and nonpartisanship, but most often encompasses all of these qualities. First evolving as a practice in the 18th century, a number of critiques and alternatives to the notion have emerged since, fuelling ongoing and dynamic discourse surrounding the ideal of objectivity in journalism.

Most newspapers and TV stations depend upon news agencies for their material, and each of the four major global agencies (Agence France-Presse (formerly the Havas agency), Associated Press, Reuters, and Agencia EFE) began with and continue to operate on a basic philosophy of providing a single objective news feed to all subscribers. That is, they do not provide separate feeds for conservative or liberal newspapers. Journalist Jonathan Fenby has explained the notion:

To achieve such wide acceptability, the agencies avoid overt partiality. The demonstrably correct information is their stock-in-trade. Traditionally, they report at a reduced level of responsibility, attributing their information to a spokesman, the press, or other sources. They avoid making judgments and steer clear of doubt and ambiguity. Though their founders did not use the word, objectivity is the philosophical basis for their enterprises – or failing that, widely acceptable neutrality.

Objectivity in journalism aims to help the audience make up their own minds about a story, providing the facts alone and then letting audiences interpret those on their own. To maintain objectivity in journalism, journalists should present the facts whether or not they agree with or personally endorse those facts. Objective reporting is meant to portray issues and events in a neutral and unbiased manner, regardless of the writer's opinion or personal beliefs.

== Definitions ==
Sociologist Michael Schudson suggests that "the belief in objectivity is a faith in 'facts,' a distrust in 'values,' and a commitment to their segregation". Objectivity also outlines an institutional role for journalists as a fourth estate, a body that exists apart from government and large interest groups.

Journalistic objectivity requires that a journalist not be on either side of an argument. The journalist must report only the facts and not a personal attitude toward the facts. While objectivity is a complex and dynamic notion that may refer to a multitude of techniques and practices, it generally refers to the idea of "three distinct, yet interrelated, concepts": truthfulness, neutrality, and detachment.

Truthfulness is a commitment to reporting only accurate and truthful information, without skewing any facts or details to improve the story or better align an issue with any certain agenda. Neutrality suggests that stories be reported in an unbiased, even-handed, and impartial manner. Under this notion, journalists are to side with none of the parties involved, and simply provide the relevant facts and information of all. The third idea, detachment, refers to the emotional approach of the journalist. Essentially, reporters should not only approach issues in an unbiased manner but also with a dispassionate and emotionless attitude. Through this strategy, stories can be presented in a rational and calm manner, letting the audience make up their minds without any influences from the media.

== History ==
The modern notion of objectivity in journalism is largely due to the work of Walter Lippmann. Lippmann was the first to widely call for journalists to use the scientific method for gathering information. Lippmann called for journalistic objectivity after the excesses of yellow journalism. He noted that the yellows at the time had served their purpose, but that the people needed to receive the actual news, and not a "romanticized version of it".

The term objectivity was not applied to journalistic work until the 20th century, but it had fully emerged as a guiding principle by the 1890s. Michael Schudson, among a number of other communication scholars and historians, agree that the idea of objectivity has prevailed in dominant discourse among journalists in the United States since the appearance of modern newspapers in the Jacksonian Era of the 1830s. These papers transformed the press amidst the democratization of politics, the expansion of a market economy, and the growing authority of an entrepreneurial, urban middle class. Before then, American newspapers were expected to present a partisan viewpoint, not a neutral one.

The need for objectivity first occurred to Associated Press editors who realized that partisanship would narrow their potential market. Their goal was to reach all newspapers and leave it to the individual papers to decide on what slanting and commentary were needed. Lawrence Gobright, the AP chief in Washington, explained the philosophy of objectivity to Congress in 1856:

My business is to communicate facts. My instructions do not allow me to make any comments upon the facts which I communicate. My dispatches are sent to papers of all manner of politics, and the editors say they are able to make their own comments upon the facts which are sent to them. I, therefore confine myself to what I consider legitimate news. I do not act as a politician belonging to any school, but try to be truthful and impartial. My dispatches are a merely dry matter of fact and detail.

In the first decade of the twentieth century, it was uncommon to see a sharp divide between facts and values. However, Stuart Allan (1997) suggests that, during World War I, scholar propaganda campaigns, as well as the rise of "press agents and publicity experts", fostered the growing cynicism among the public towards state institutions and "official channels of information". The elevation of objectivity thus constituted an effort to re-legitimatize the news-press, as well as the state in general.

Some historians, like Gerald Baldasty, have observed that objectivity went hand in hand with the need to make profits in the newspaper business by attracting advertisers. In this economic analysis, publishers did not want to offend any potential advertising clients and therefore encouraged news editors and reporters to strive to present all sides of an issue. Advertisers would remind the press that partisanship hurts circulation, and, consequently, advertising revenues—thus, objectivity was sought.

Others have proposed a political explanation for the rise of objectivity; scholars like Richard Kaplan have argued that political parties needed to lose their hold over the loyalties of voters and the institutions of government before the press could feel free to offer a nonpartisan, "impartial" account of news events. This change occurred following the critical 1896 election and the subsequent reform of the Progressive Era.

Later, during the period following World War II, the newly formalized rules and practices of objectivity led to a brief national consensus and temporary suspension of negative public opinion; however, doubts and uncertainties in "the institutions of democracy and capitalism" resurfaced in the period of civil unrest during the 1960s and 1970s, ultimately leading to the emergence of the critique of objectivity.

In conclusion, there are three key factors in the origin of objectivity. The transition from a political model of journalism to a commercial model requires the production of content that can be marketed across the political and ideological spectrum. The telegraph imposes pressures on journalists to prioritize the most important facts at the beginning of the story and adopt a simplified, homogenized and generic style that could appeal to geographically diverse audiences. In the early 20th century, journalism started to define itself as a professional occupation that required special training, unique skills and self-regulation according to ethical principles. Professionalization normalized the regime of objectivity as the foundation of good journalism, providing benefits to journalists and editors/publishers.

For most of the 19th century, most of the publications and news were written by one person. Writers could express their own perspectives and opinions. However, since the 1880s, Americans started to become interested in some scientific theories and facts which narrowed the ways that writers could express their feelings. The use of technology led to more productivity and control. New tech in the news process has worked to establish a discourse of speed. The discourse of speed has also become stronger and more encompassing over time. The transformation of the newspaper produced a medium requiring a fairly sophisticated team of many different kinds of laborers. Journalists are expected to possess technical skills in computer-based and new media technologies to some extent, placing new demands on journalists now.

== Criticisms ==
Megan Willams (journalist), "...Objectivity does not exist (especially for journalists)..."; interviewed in Varanasi in December 2010 by Vrinda Dar

Some scholars and journalists criticize the understanding of objectivity as neutrality or nonpartisanship, arguing that it does a disservice to the public because it fails to attempt to find truth. They also argue that such objectivity is nearly impossible to apply in practice—newspapers inevitably take a point of view in deciding what stories to cover, which to feature on the front page, and what sources they quote. The media critics Edward S. Herman and Noam Chomsky have advanced a propaganda model hypothesis proposing that such a notion of objectivity results in heavily favoring government viewpoints and large corporations. Mainstream commentators accept that news value drives selection of stories, but there is some debate as to whether catering to an audience's level of interest in a story makes the selection process non-objective.

Another example of an objection to objectivity, according to communication scholar David Mindich, was the coverage that the major papers (most notably the New York Times) gave to the lynching of thousands of African Americans during the 1890s. News stories of the period described the hanging, immolation and mutilation of people by mobs with detachment and, through the regimen of objectivity, news writers often attempted to construct a "false balance" of these accounts by recounting the alleged transgressions of the victims that provoked the lynch mobs to fury. Mindich suggests that by enabling practices of objectivity and allowing them to "[go] basically unquestioned", it may have had the effect of normalizing the practice of lynching.

In a more recent example, scholars Andrew Calcutt and Phillip Hammond (2011) note that since the 1990s, war reporting (especially) has increasingly come to criticize and reject the practice of objectivity. In 1998, a BBC reporter, Martin Bell, noted that he favoured a "journalism of attachment", over the previously sought after dispassionate approach. Similarly, U.S. war correspondent Christiane Amanpour stated that in some circumstances "neutrality can mean you are an accomplice to all sorts of evil". Each of these opinions stems from scholar's and journalist's critique of objectivity as too "heartless" or "forensic" to report the human natured and emotionally charged issues found in war and conflict reporting.

As discussed above, with the growth of mass media, especially from the 19th century, news advertising became the most important source of media revenue. Whole audiences needed to be engaged across communities and regions to maximize advertising revenue. This led to "[j]ournalistic [o]bjectivity as an industry standard […] a set of conventions allowing the news to be presented as all things to all people". In modern journalism, especially with the emergence of 24-hour news cycles, speed is of the essence in responding to breaking stories. It is therefore not possible for reporters to decide "from first principles" how they will report each and every story that presents itself—thus, some scholars argue that mere convention (versus a true devotion to truth-seeking) has come to govern much of journalism.

Reporters are biased toward conflict because it is more interesting than stories without conflict; we are biased toward sticking with the pack because it is safe; we are biased toward event-driven coverage because it is easier; we are biased toward existing narratives because they are safe and easy. Mostly, though, we are biased in favor of getting the story, regardless of whose ox is being gored.

— Brent Cunningham, 2003

Brent Cunningham, the managing editor of Columbia Journalism Review, argues in a 2003 article that objectivity excuses lazy reporting. He suggests that objectivity makes us passive recipients of news, rather than aggressive analyzers and critics of it. According to Cunningham, the nut of the tortured relationship with objectivity lies within a number of conflicting diktats that the press was subjected to operate under: be neutral yet investigative; be disengaged yet have an impact; and be fair-minded yet have an edge. Cunningham, however, argues that reporters by and large are not ideological warriors; rather, they are imperfect people performing a difficult job that is crucial to society and, "[d]espite all our important and necessary attempts to minimize [individual's] humanity, it can't be any other way", Cunningham concludes.

In their 1998 book Custodians of Conscience, Theodore L. Glasser and James Ettema contend that the norms of professional journalism are effectively an effort to "objectify morality", and that journalists must put social justice advocacy above journalistic objectivity. Glasser argues that "Journalists need to be overt and candid advocates for social justice, and it's hard to do that under the constraints of objectivity."

Another notion circulating around the critique of objectivity is proposed by scholar Judith Lichtenberg. She points to the logical inconsistency that arises when scholars or journalists criticize journalism for failing to be objective, while simultaneously proposing that there is no such thing as objectivity. Underpinning critiques of objectivity that arose in the 1970s and 1980s, this dual theory—which Lichtenberg refers to as a "compound assault on objectivity"—invalidates itself, as each element of the argument repudiates the other. Lichtenberg agrees with other scholars that view objectivity as mere conventional practice: she states that "much of what goes under the name of objectivity reflects shallow understanding of it". Thus, she suggests that these practices, rather than the overall notion of objectivity (whose primary aim, according to Lichtenberg, is only to seek and pursue truth), should really be the target of critique.

The debate about objectivity has also occurred within the photojournalism field. In 2011, Italian photographer Ruben Salvadori challenged the expectation of objective truth that the general public associates with photojournalism in his project "Photojournalism Behind the Scenes". By including the traditionally invisible photographer into the frame, Salvadori sought to ignite a discussion about the ethics of the profession, and indicate a need for audiences to be active viewers who understand and recognize the potential subjectivity of the photographic medium.

=== View from nowhere ===
Journalism scholars and media critics have used the term view from nowhere to criticize journalists' attempt to adopt a neutral and objective point of view in reporting, as if reporting "from nobody's point of view". Jay Rosen has argued that journalists may thereby disinform their audience by creating the impression that they have an authoritative impartiality between conflicting positions on an issue. Jeremy Iggers quoted Richard S. Salant, former president of CBS News, who stated: "Our reporters do not cover stories from their point of view. They are presenting them from nobody's point of view." Iggers called Salant's assertion "plainly incoherent, as is the notion of observations untouched by interpretation". Rosen has used the term to criticize journalists who hide behind the appearance of journalistic objectivity so as to gain an unearned position of authority or trust with their audience; he advocates for transparency as a better way of legitimately earning trust.

Scholars such as Rosen and Jake Lynch borrowed the term from philosopher Thomas Nagel's 1986 book The View from Nowhere, which stated, "A view or form of thought is more objective than another if it relies less on the specifics of the individual's makeup and position in the world." Many other news media commentators have also criticized the view from nowhere in journalism. Writer Elias Isquith argues in a 2014 article for Salon that "the view from nowhere not only leads to sloppy thinking but actually leaves the reader less informed than she would be had she simply read an unapologetically ideological source or even, in some cases, nothing at all". Ramona Martinez further argues that "objectivity is the ideology of the status quo." In 2019, journalist Lewis Raven Wallace published a book advocating the opposite of the view from nowhere: the view from somewhere.

== Alternatives ==
Some argue that a more appropriate standard should be fairness and accuracy (as enshrined in the names of groups like Fairness and Accuracy in Reporting). Under this standard, taking sides on an issue would be permitted as long as the side taken was accurate and the other side was given a fair chance to respond. Many professionals believe that true objectivity in journalism is not possible and reporters must seek balance in their stories (giving all sides their respective points of view), which fosters fairness.

A good reporter who is well-steeped in his subject matter and who isn't out to prove his cleverness, but rather is sweating out a detailed understanding of a topic worth exploring, will probably develop intelligent opinions that will inform and perhaps be expressed in his journalism.

— Timothy Noah, 1999

Brent Cunningham suggests that reporters should understand their inevitable biases, so they can explore what the accepted narratives may be, and then work against these as much as possible. He points out that "[w]e need deep reporting and real understanding, but we also need reporters to acknowledge all that they don't know, and not try to mask that shortcoming behind a gloss of attitude, or drown it in a roar of oversimplified assertions".

Cunningham suggests the following to solve the apparent controversies of objectivity:

- Journalists should acknowledge, humbly and publicly, that what they do is far more subjective and far less detached than the aura of "objectivity" implies. He proposes that this will not end the charges of bias, but rather allow journalists to defend what they do from a more realistic and less hypocritical position.
- Journalists should be free and encouraged to develop expertise and to use it to sort through competing claims, identifying and explaining the underlying assumptions of those claims, and making judgments about what readers and viewers need to know and understand about what is happening.

In the words of another scholar, Faina (2012) suggests that modern journalists may function as "sensemakers" within the shifting contemporary journalistic environment.

Notable departures from objective news work also include the muckraking of Ida Tarbell and Lincoln Steffens, the New Journalism of Tom Wolfe, the underground press of the 1960s, and public journalism.

For news related to conflict, peace journalism may provide an alternative by introducing insights of social science into the journalism field, specifically through disciplines such as conflict analysis, conflict resolution, peace research and social psychology. The application of this empirical research to the reporting of conflict may thus replace the unacknowledged conventions (see above) which govern the non-scientific practices of 'objectivity' of journalism.

== Crowdfunding ==
The new digital era of the 21st century has caused general upheaval of the news industry and journalistic environment. In the face of this, the practice of crowdfunding is increasingly being utilized by journalists to fund independent and/or alternative projects, establishing it as another relevant alternative practice to consider in the discussion of journalistic objectivity. Crowdfunding allows journalists to pursue stories of interest to them or that otherwise may not be covered adequately for a number of reasons. Crowdfunding supports journalists by funding necessary components like reporting equipment, computers, travel expenses if necessary, and overhead costs like office space or paying other staff on their team. A key component of crowdfunding and a significant motivator for journalists to use it is the lack of corporate backing. This means that the journalist has the autonomy to make editorial decisions at their sole discrection but there is equally no financial support.

According to a study conducted by Hunter (2014), journalists engaged in a crowdfunding campaign all held a similar opinion that their funders did not have control over the content and that it was the journalist who maintained ultimate jurisdiction. However, this pronouncement was complicated by the sense of accountability or responsibility incited in journalists towards their funders. Hunter (2014) notes that this may have the effect of creating a power imbalance between funders and the journalist, as journalists want to maintain editorial control, but it is in fact the funders that decide whether the project will be a success or not.

To combat this, Hunter (2014) proposes the following strategies that journalists may employ to maintain a more objective approach if desired:

- Constructing an imaginary 'firewall' between themselves and their audiences
- Limiting investment from any single source
- Clearly defining the relationship they desire with funders at the outset of the project

The type of relationship and potential pressures the journalist may feel depends on the type of investor with whom they are working, as there are passive and active investors. Passive investors will not be involved beyond making a donation on the crowdfunding platform, leaving everything up to the discretion of the journalist. In contrast, active investors have a more active role in the production of the journalistic piece, which can take various forms that may include the investor providing feedback or ideas as well as receiving early copies of the work prior to its public release.

Some journalists from the study firmly held the opinion that impartial accounts and a detached, namely "objective", reporting style should continue to govern, even within a crowdfunding context. Others, however, advocated that point-of-view journalism and accurate reporting are not mutually exclusive ideals, and thus journalists still may ascribe to quality factual reporting, sans the traditional practices or understanding of objectivity.

The study on crowdfunding done by Hunter (2014) showed that audiences are keen to fund projects with a specific point of view or pieces of advocacy journalism. Journalists are often using crowdfunding to pursue stories with a point-of-view that large corporations do not pursue adequately. The journalist explains the goal of the work they are trying to pursue and what resources are needed for it on crowdfunding platforms. Based on this information, funders decide to contribute or not. The desire or acceptance of opinionated journalism is especially clear with passive investors because they donate based on the journalist's pitch and let the journalist produce what they want. They essentially just want to support the journalist as an individual and allow them the freedom to pursue the project.

== See also ==
- Access journalism
- Communicative rationality
- Degrees of truth
- Journalistic interventionism
- Media bias
- Obscurantism
- Okrent's law
- Source criticism
- Strong objectivity
- Theory of justification
- Wikipedia:Neutral point of view

== Sources ==
- Kaplan, Richard. 2002. Politics and the American Press: The Rise of Objectivity, 1865–1920. New York: Cambridge University Press.
- Schudson, Michael. 1978. Discovering the News: A Social History of American Newspapers. New York: Basic Books.
- Schudson, Michael. 1997. "The Sociology of News Production". In Social Meaning of News: A Text-Reader. Dan Berkowitz (ed.), pp. 7–22. Thousand Oaks: Sage.
