= Mr. Schneider Goes to Washington =

- DVD cover
- Directed by: Jonathan Neil Schneider
- Written by: Jonathan Neil Schneider
- Produced by: Jonathan Neil Schneider; Herb Abbott
- Cinematography: Kevin McMahon; Eric Mingorance
- Edited by: Jarrod Burt; Jay Davis; Michael Lim; Chris Ray
- Music by: Seth Barmash; George Reichart
- Distributed by: Fruckis Chuck Films
- Release date: October 14, 2007 (New Orleans Film Festival)
- Running time: 75 minutes
- Country: United States
- Language: English

Mr. Schneider goes to Washington is a 2007 American tongue-in-cheek documentary film by Jonathan Neil Schneider that takes a look at campaign financing in Washington. The film debuted at the New Orleans Film Festival in 2007, and was released on DVD in 2008.

== Background ==
Schneider was inspired to make his documentary after watching a 2004 Senator Ernest Hollings interview on 60 Minutes in which Holings lambasted the influence of money and lobbyists on the political process. He resigned from producing America’s Next Top Model and other television shows to fund his own documentary about campaign finances.

The film is a collection of interviews with lobbyists, lawmakers, government watchdogs, and porn stars, speaking about the influence of campaign contributions on politics and politicians. The adult film actors discuss a statement Jack Oliver had made about how Americans spend more money on pornography than they do on politics. Schneider had wished to include footage of a fundraising video produced by Senator Mike Crapo but, when Schneider was not allowed its use, he instead recruited homeless people to recreate scenes from the video.

== Synopsis ==
Frustrated by what he perceives as a lack of attention from Washington, Mr. Schneider travels to the U.S. capital to investigate how the government operates He finds that campaign financing and lobbying play a significant role in political decision-making. The film examines these influences across areas including education, health care, social security, taxation, foreign policy and energy prices, arguing that the interests of businesses and other organized groups can affect government policy. It also features interviews with lobbyists, members of congress, lawyers, and officials involved in regulating campaign finance and lobbying, who discuss the role of money and organized interests in American politics.

== Cast ==
- Jonathan Neil Schneider
- Patrick Basham
- Tony Coelho
- Michael Clayton
- Danny Davis
- Jehmu Greene
- Bill Hillsman
- Nikki Hunter
- Dennis Johnson
- Sunny Lane
- David Mindich
- John Leboutillier
- Trevor Potter
- Tony Parker as Lobbyist A
- Christopher Shays
- Rodney Smith
- Scott Thomas
- Steve Weissman
- Wright Andrews
- Jan Witlod Barron
- Johan Bloom
- Mike Fraioli
- Craig Holman
- Kevin Michael Key as Senator Mike Crapo
- Amanda Scarnati
- Barbara Lippert
- Sashae Siaibi as Lobbyist B
- Steve Weiss
- Lexi Tyler
- Adam Morse

== Reception ==
The 2007 New Orleans Film Festival wrote, "Amazingly Mr. Schneider has made a film about corruption and apathy that is informative, entertaining and enraging."

The 2007 Cucalorus Film Festival wrote, "Not all political documentaries are dull and staid, this one has porn stars. Perhaps it’s what you’d expect from a reality producer, but the result is a virtual makeover of the genre to make it fresh and fun."

In March 2008, Lee Iacocca praised the film, calling it a "fantastic documentary film" which was timely, funny, and entertaining, and recommended "to all my friends in the media, if you want to know what Lee Iacocca thinks is wrong with politics, watch Mr. Schneider Goes to Washington."
