= Peace journalism =

Style and theory of reporting

Peace journalism is a genre and theory of journalism that aims to treat stories about war and conflict with balance, in contrast to war journalism, which peace journalism advocates say display a bias toward violence. The theory proposes practical methods for correcting biases in stories appearing in the mainstream and alternative media, and suggests ways for journalists to work with other media professionals, audiences, and organizations in conflict.

This concept was proposed by Johan Galtung. Other terms for this broad definition of peace journalism include conflict solution journalism, conflict sensitive journalism, constructive conflict coverage, and reporting the world.

War journalism is journalism about conflict that has a value bias towards violence and violent groups. This usually leads audiences to overvalue violent responses to conflict and ignore non-violent alternatives. This is understood to be the result of well documented news reporting conventions. These conventions focus only on physical effects of conflict (for example ignoring psychological impacts) and elite positions (which may or may not represent the actual parties and their goals). It is also biased toward reporting only the differences between parties, (rather than similarities, previous agreements, and progress on common issues) the here and now (ignoring causes and outcomes), and zero sums (assuming that one side's needs can only be met by the other side's compromise or defeat).

Peace journalism aims to correct for these biases. Its operational definition is "to allow opportunities for society at large to consider and value non-violent responses to conflict". This involves picking up calls for, and articulations of, non-violence policies from whatever quarter, and allowing them into the public sphere.

== Origins ==
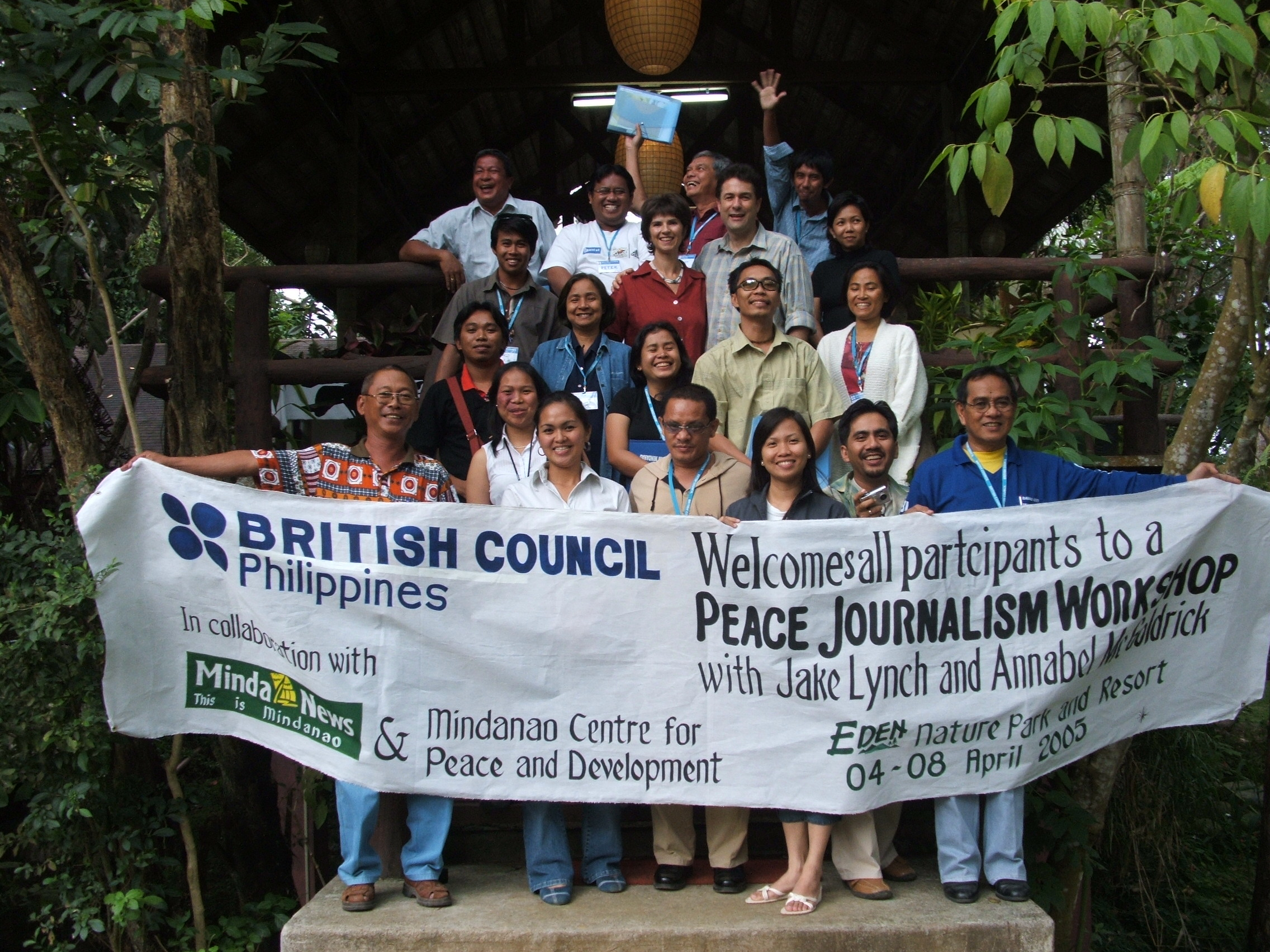
Peace journalism workshop in Mindanao, the Philippines

Peace journalism follows a long history of news publication, originating in non-sectarian Christian peace movements and societies of the early 19th century, which published periodicals. Sectarian organizations also created publications focused on peace as part of their proselytizing in the 19th century, as did utopian communities of the period. From the 20th century, a prominent example of sectarian journalism focused on peace was Dorothy Day's Catholic Worker.

Besides being an element in the histories of pacifism and the social movement press, peace journalism is a set of journalism practices that emerged in the 1970s. Norwegian sociologist, peace researcher and practitioner Johan Galtung proposed the idea of peace journalism for journalists to follow to show how a value bias towards violence can be avoided when covering war and conflict. Christian organizations such as The World Council of Churches and The World Association for Christian Communication also practice peace journalism.

Peace journalism aims to shed light on structural and cultural causes of violence, as they impact upon the lives of people in a conflict arena as part of the explanation for violence. It aims to frame conflicts as consisting of many parties and pursuing many goals rather than a simple dichotomy. An explicit aim of peace journalism is to promote peace initiatives from whatever quarter and to allow the reader to distinguish between stated positions and real goals.

== Relation to war journalism ==
Peace journalism came about through research arguing that typical conflict reporting is unethical. Research and practice in peace journalism outlines a number of reasons for the existence and dominance of war journalism in conflict news.

=== Vested interests of war journalism ===
Firstly, the notion that media elites always act to preserve their favored status quo, and their own commercial and political interests, is given relatively little weight. Shared characteristics of the socio-economic class, which heavily influences the production of journalism, are important. For example, their shared ideological pressures, perceptions, attitudes, and values form the basis of a "dominant reading" of facts that are selected to appear in news. These can then act to fix and naturalize meaning and hide the actual creation of meaning.

However, even in the presence of powerful elite media interests against war, war journalism often dominates conflict discourse. Jake Lynch and Annabel McGoldrick show examples from Britain, Ireland, Georgia, and Iraq, where war journalism dominated coverage despite key influential media interests against war.

=== Journalistic objectivity ===
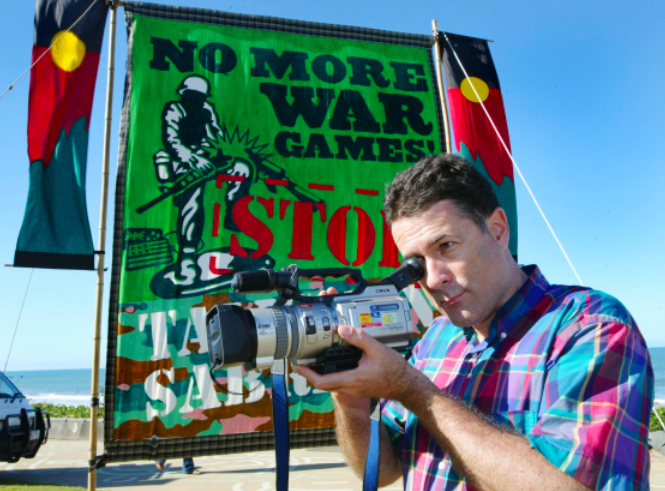
Peace journalist Jake Lynch covering protests against joint US-Australia military exercises in Australia

Therefore, not only political and economic, but also social and cultural factors have contributed to the dominance of war journalism in conflict reporting. With the growth of mass media, especially from the 19th century, news advertising became the most important source of media revenue.

Whole audiences needed to be engaged across communities and regions to maximize advertising revenue. This led to "Journalistic objectivity as an industry standard ... a set of conventions allowing the news to be presented as all things to all people". And in modern journalism, especially with the emergence of 24 hour news cycles, speed is of the essence in responding to breaking stories. It is not possible for reporters to decide "from first principals" every time how they will report each and every story that presents itself. It follows that convention governs much of journalism.

The rise of journalistic objectivity was part of a larger movement within western academia towards empirical "just report the facts" epistemology and research. By the 1980s it was focused on the philosophical ideal of objectivity. Mindich argues that journalistic objectivity should be distinguished from scientific objectivity. For example, the experimental sciences use:

1. Inter-laboratory replication;
2. Random assignment of subjects to conditions;
3. Efforts to ensure that human subjects and experimenters are ignorant of the expectations (hypotheses) of the research: to avoid the observer-expectancy effect
4. The subject-expectancy effect;
5. Anonymous peer review, a form of peer review, to promote open and systematic exploration of meaning without subjective, political bias;
6. Careful analysis to ensure that research subjects are adequately representative of the general population, that is not overly atypical when compared to the average population.

While it is arguable whether these experimental science safe guards provide true objectivity, in the absence of these safeguards, journalism around conflict relies on three conventions to maintain its own form of objectivity (also see journalistic objectivity), and is therefore distinct from scientific objectivity.

==== War journalism conventions ====
Firstly, to sell audiences to advertisers, reporting must appeal to as broad an audience as possible and therefore focuses on facts that are the least controversial. Conflict processes are often controversial, so coverage of them risks alienating potential consumers, who may be sensitive to the exposure of structural or cultural predisposing factors.

Secondly, a bias in favor of official sources means that, while it may appear uncontroversial, as there is only one official representative for the government on any given issue and since only the official government is usually allowed to wield legal, sanctioned force within its territory coverage will tend to privilege violent responses to conflict over non-violent, social-psychological, context-informed responses.

Journalists Annabel McGoldrick and Jake Lynch argue that non-critical reporting of official sources is often rewarded by those sources. Through "information transactions", these same official sources allow uncritical journalists privileged access to information in the future.

Thirdly and lastly, 'dualism' biases journalistic objectivity towards violence: "A decision to tell a story in that [bipolar] way can slip past, unnoticed, without drawing attention to itself because of its close resemblance, in shape and structure, to so much of the story-telling we already take for granted".

=== Gatekeeping in war journalism ===
These conventions also form "gates" by which gatekeepers in journalism include or exclude various aspects of reality in final publication.

In this way, proponents of peace journalism argue that in the media meaning occurs according to: "a set of rules and relations established before the reality or the experience under discussion actually occurred". In war journalism the objectivity conventions serve this purpose, but are shadowy and unacknowledged. Gatekeeping is therefore likely to be secretive and haphazard. It may distort, and also fix, meaning in conflict coverage and obfuscate the production of meaning.

Peace journalism evaluative criteria might be applied to show how conventional conflict reporting is biased in favor of violence and violent groups. An example is the coverage leading up to the September 2009 meeting between Israeli Prime Minister Benjamin Netanyahu, Palestinian President Mahmoud Abbas, and US President Barack Obama.

Reporting was highly reactive and focused on the visible effects of the conflict, such as announcements and public disagreements between official spokespeople that appeared to disrupt peace efforts.

Coverage was oriented to elites with little mention of non-official peace efforts by individuals and groups such as the Hand in Hand network of schools, the Israeli/Palestinian The Parents Circle Families Forum, Peace Now, Breaking the Silence, Physicians for Human Rights, Machsom Watch, and Checkpoint Watch, Hanan Ashrawi (non-violent activist for human rights, founder of the Palestinian Initiative for the Promotion of Global Dialogue and Democracy, and member of the Palestinian Legislative Council).

Also ignored were programmes that promote cultural exchange, for example (the Israeli-Palestinian Aussie Rules football team The Peace Team), see here for official 2011 team details) which played in the 2008 and 2011 AFL International Cups. Another is the current programme of Palestinian children's visits to the Old Yishuv Court Museum in the Jewish Quarter of Jerusalem. Events demonstrating non-violent responses to the conflict were also ignored, an example being the March 12, 2011, Conference on Civil Disobedience in the West Bank marking the centenary of International Women's Day. Projects working for peace among Arabs and Israelis lists further organizations working for peace in the region, whose activities are generally excluded from news on the Conflict.

Reporting leading up to the September 2009 meeting between Netanyahu, Abbas and Obama focused almost solely on highly divisive issues, such as Israeli illegal settlements in the West Bank and Jerusalem, and the diplomatic/official status of Jerusalem. Coverage was also oriented towards differences, with a focus on the here and now. Potential benefits in physical, economic, and social security of peaceful relations were ignored, and "progress" towards peace was portrayed as having to come with one or more parties compromising and surrendering their positions on key issues, which is of course a zero sum orientation. Coverage generally ignored the background or context of positions. Positions were presented as unchangeable on any peaceful settlement, rather than the public "face" of unmet needs that often drive violent conflicts. Because of distrust between parties these needs are often not honestly expressed publicly.

Peace journalism argues that the objectivity conventions are likely to have important and consistent effects that distort the way audiences understand a conflict.

In war journalism, violence is typically presented as only its own cause, ignoring the possibility of structural or psychological causes. Since violence is assumed to have no cause or explanation (such as the deprived needs of parties), conventional conflict reporting may leave viewers to conclude that the only "natural" or reasonable response to violence is more violence. That "more violence—'the only language they understand'—is an appropriate remedy", and that non-violent responses are irrelevant or 'unrealistic'.

This focus on only physical violent behavior is an example of what leading Conflict Analyst and Peace Researcher, Johan Galtung identifies as a major flaw in responses to inter-communal conflict: the "Conservative Fallacy".

This bias towards prioritizing violent actors with coverage is then expected by violent groups, through what is called a Feedback Loop. Parties to a conflict often try to use the media to advance their position, rather than being passive subjects, unaware of being observed, as assumed in sciences where humans are not the subjects. Journalist, and journalism Associate Professor, Jake Lynch notes that "it is not the influence of news on public opinion as such, but assumptions by parties to conflict about its likely or possible influence, that condition their behaviour".

In this way war journalism is an example of the role of power in representation and of the media trying to fix meaning, in this case about violence and its causes, for "it to become naturalized so that is the only meaning it can possibly carry ... where you cannot see that anybody ever produced it."

War journalism is understood as reporting on conflict in a way which imposes an artificially confined closed space, and closed time, with causes and exits existing only in the conflict arena. Peace journalism can then be understood as journalism that avoids this outside imposition, which more objectively assesses the possibility of conflicts taking place in open space, and open time with any number of causes and exits.

=== Effects of war journalism ===
The Salvadoran Civil War, largely a peasant revolution, took place 1980–1992. The USA supported the right-wing government. During the war 75,000 people were killed, 8,000 more went missing and another million exiled. On 17 March 1980, the village of Ingenio Colima was attacked by paramilitaries who murdered all its occupants. At the time, the country's media gave a biased account of what took place. The intention today – in the face of open hostility from today's political leaders is to investigate and clarify what happened and to contribute to a national process of truth and reconciliation.

The emotional effects of war journalism also make it more difficult for audiences to be aware of this biased presentation of conflict. War journalism takes advantage of the emotional "high" humans can get from fear through evolutionary psychological mechanisms. In a similar way, war journalism appeals to "lower order" needs for security and belonging. The prefrontal cortex, governing working memory, rational attentive functioning, and complex thought is inhibited by activation of the brain's fear centre, the limbic system.

Audiences are thus deprived of cognitive resources with which to recognize the role of fear in encouraging war journalism consumption. This cognitive deprivation also further fixes meaning and increases the role of "automatically activated attitudes" which according to cognitive psychology: "guide attention toward attitude-consistent information, provide a template with which to interpret ambiguous information, and ... guide behaviour in a relatively spontaneous fashion". Therefore viewers are primed to pay more attention to future information, which is consistent with the automatically activated attitudes formed by war journalism. Research into the ever present framing in the media supports this conclusion: "Certainly people can recall their own facts, forge linkages not made explicitly in the text, or retrieve from memory a causal explanation or cure that is completely absent from the text. In essence, this is just what professors encourage their students to do habitually. But Zaller (1992), Kahneman and Tversky (1984), and Iyengar (1991), among others, suggest that on most matters of social or political interest, people are not generally so well-informed and cognitively active, and that framing therefore heavily influences their responses to communications".

Research shows that war journalism can have negative emotional impacts on audience members. These include feelings of hopelessness and powerlessness, compounded by increased anxiety, mood disturbance, sadness and a sense of disconnection with physical and social environments. Research by Galtung and Ruge (1965) finds negativity bias in foreign news. This has also been confirmed more recently by Nohrstedt and Ottosen (2008). This can affect reactions towards the conflict itself, and an audience's general psychological wellbeing, which biases their view of the world as excessively chaotic and may cause serious anxiety and emotional difficulties, and a sense of disempowerment and disconnection. Vicarious trauma can increase these negative effects, where "even 'normal', intelligent, educated individuals can become highly suggestible towards violent acts in formerly unexpected contexts".

These negative emotional states may discourage audience members from criticism and challenge of the biased information presented through war journalism. These public concerns may appear to be "someone else's problem" and best left to "experts", who alone have the necessary knowledge, time, and emotional endurance. These negative emotional responses may also discourage creative engagement with the conflict and conflict parties. This is especially troubling considering the critical role of creativity in conflict resolution and peacebuilding.

== Feedback loop ==
Peace journalism analysis suggests that typical news on conflict, with its value bias towards violence and violent groups, has important effects on the parties to conflict. Firstly, peace journalism proponents argue that the bias in favour of publicity for violence and violent actors, "plays into" the interests of violent actors to intimidate and disrupt the peace process. This is an example of a positive feedback loop between war and war journalism: "it is not the influence of news on public opinion as such, but assumptions by parties to conflict about its likely or possible influence, that condition their behaviour". This bias also weakens and punishes, with less publicity, non-violent groups affected by a conflict, for their lack of violence. Nohrstedt and Ottosen (2002) note: "if traditional media themselves are unable to transmit alternative perspectives and voice the danger is that those ... that feel marginalised will turn to terror in order to make a difference in the media agenda".

The most visible actions of a group, of which one is not a member, are often considered representative of that group's behaviour (an effect called the "availability heuristic"). Therefore war journalism's over-selection of violent, as opposed to non-violent, responses to conflict may actually foster a misperception of excessive threat between parties. This is then generally exaggerated by other inter-group social-cognitive biases within war journalism. These include biases towards: seeing an outgroup as more homogeneous (with less internal variety) than it really is, ignoring the variety of attitudes towards the conflict; seeing ambiguous situations, or negative group behavior, as playing out internal, and stable, group characteristics rather than external, and variable, circumstances, favourable ingroup/outgroup comparison to increase collective self esteem; and members of groups who perceive themselves to be under threat to be more pressured internally to conform with and reinforce dominant group norms; premature and immediate resistance to ideas on positive responses to violence offered by members of outgroups.

Louis Kriesberg, a sociologist at Syracuse University, and expert on conflict resolution points out that: "conventional thinking among partisans in a fight generally attributes destructive persistence in a conflict to the enemy's character, asserting that the enemy is aggressive by nature, has evil leaders, or adheres to a hostile ideology". And Professor of World Religions, Diplomacy and Conflict Resolution, Marc Gopin, agrees with the importance of psychological factors in escalating conflict: "being hated normally generates deep injury and corresponding anger in most recipients is what I call a "conflict dance" of action/reaction".

A peace journalism perspective also highlights another effect of typical conflict journalism on the groups engaged in a conflict: war journalism's common focus on the human drama and tragedy of violence. Hamber and Lewis (1997) note war journalism "often involves painting doomsday scenarios of victims who are irreparably damaged and for whom there appears to be no solution and no future". This creates an increased impediment for the victims of unreported crimes. And the positive experiences of those who have embarked upon a process of recovery is often ignored in war journalism. For example in Israel/Palestine, victims of suicide bombing, house demolition, land and house theft, are often portrayed as defenceless, disempowered victims with no prospect of healing or positive response to their predicament.

Effective non-violent bridge building between communities such as the Hand in Hand Arab/Jewish school network in Israel, are routinely ignored in war journalism coverage. Non-violent initiatives illustrate what can be possible through peaceful responses to conflict but this information is artificially "filtered out" through the coverage biases of war journalism. Parties are therefore presented with a biased picture of the entire conflict, favouring violent responses to the conflict. Parties are led to believe that that violence is the only way their needs can be met, thereby reinforcing and escalating cycles of dangerous retaliation between groups. Peace journalism would also charge that this pattern of conventional conflict reporting submerges the emotional cost of violent conflict and therefore makes the psychological aspects of cycles of revenge subtle, and so more difficult to prevent.

All of this missed information could represent a crucial movement away from violence, as the only option for threatened groups towards peace. But only if they are not hidden by journalistic assumptions that they are irrelevant, and should not be reported. This is of special concern, given that the collective trauma suffered by a population, and the fear that this generates, can lead to a reduced capacity for decision making and action.

== Peace journalism as a response to war journalism ==
In response to war journalism's value bias in favour of violence, peace journalism promises two key benefits: for those concerned with objectivity in journalism, it aims to avoid and counteract the persistent bias of valuing violence and violent parties. Secondly, as all journalism must in some way appeal to the values of their audiences, for those who value the promotion of peace and social justice over violence, it provides a practical methodology.

The 'fixation of meaning' in war journalism is often hidden by the "scattered opposition facts" that often occur in its coverage. However these do not actually allow for "challenging a dominant frame" of pro-violence: 'Framing' researcher Entman recommends: "If educated to understand the difference between including scattered oppositional facts, and challenging a dominant frame, journalists might be better equipped to construct news that makes equally salient—equally accessible to the average, inattentive, and marginally informed audience—two or more interpretations of problems."

=== Decisions ===
Peace journalism is anchored in peace and conflict studies "to map out solid ground beneath our feet; to declare, in advance, that we intend to use it, to assign meanings and draw distinctions." Decisions, on which of the almost infinite stories and facts to report, can be made openly and systematically. Lynch (2008) shows how these two disciplines are important anchors for conflict journalism in that they employ the academic rigor of the social sciences including: "openness about – and prepared to justify – starting assumptions for both observation and interpretation; and peer review. Built into social science, moreover, is an allowance for the participant-observer effect – as soon as you start to observe something, you cannot avoid changing it."

As such peace journalism considers the effect it has on audiences and parties with regard to its own objectivity. Lynch and Galtung (2010) elaborate on how this operates in conflict journalism: "'It is an important distinction in this context because journalism itself may be part of the extended pattern of conflictual relationships, in which parties and their shared relations find themselves embedded – if only by bringing an audience to the ringside. Tillett comments: "In some situations, individuals (or groups) will 'fight to the death' (even when obviously losing all that they claim to be seeking) to avoid being seen to 'back down' or 'lose face'" (1999, p. 29). In a conflict, he continues, "the presence of an audience generally makes it more likely that the protagonists will want to be seen to win, and that they will be less prepared to resolve than to fight". Schattschneider argues that spectators are "an integral part of the situation for, as likely as not, the audience determines the outcome of the fight" (1960, p. 2)."

=== Inter-group violence ===
Conflict analysis provides guidance on mapping the hopes, needs, and fears of all parties to a conflict, including outwardly impartial third parties; and acknowledges the potential role of creativity, rather than assuming as war journalism does, that the positions of elites, power gradients and the struggle for power are the most important determinants of a conflict.

These can then be assessed empirically in the conflict, and its potential resolution, rather than being ignored from the outset by journalists, as often is the case in war journalism. Therefore the importance in peace journalism of being willing to consider conflict as "open in space and time, with causes and exits anywhere". Lynch and Galtung (2010) present an important example of this in the case of North and South Korea, indicating that journalists should not ignore the grassroots people that endure this conflict, and that comparisons and input from the reunified Germany may be helpful, as could consideration and dialogue with East Asia. The aim here is not to impose definite answers. Peace and conflict studies often elicit useful perspectives from those involved in the conflict. Empirical questions can then be put forward, and tested by investigative journalism.

These processes demonstrate that conflict is not static and intractable. These insights challenge the psychological tendencies of war journalism noted above to present negative outgroup behaviour as the result of stable group characteristics. Indeed the non-linear cycle of violence outlined by Elworthy and Rogers (2002), proposes that the key stage to prevent a cycle of revenge, is before the anger becomes bitterness. And peace journalism can allow for the consideration that "bitterness can be thought of as anger + memory ... storing away trauma in a 'trauma bank' and, eventually, withdrawing it as 'glory' through further violence".

Through reporting, which does not routinely ignore causes and non-linear cycles of violence, peace journalism can help expand the cognitive and emotional space for peace initiatives that contribute peacebuilding.

A positive feedback loop between the media and peace processes could then support the creation and continuation of peaceful process-structures . This would involve demonstrating a pattern of coverage that leads present and potential peace actors to predict that their efforts will be reported by journalists to "create opportunities for society at large to consider and value non-violent responses to conflict". This in turn could reduce negative inter-group social-psychological tendencies. This may be particularly important for projects such as the examples in Israel/Palestine of the 'Hand in Hand' network of schools, 'Peace Now', 'Breaking the Silence', 'Physicians for Human Rights', 'Machsom Watch' and 'Checkpoint Watch', which as mainly grassroots initiatives, are generally more fragile than mid level or upper level peace activities.

== Examples ==
As a pedagogical practice, peace journalism training often uses pairs of war journalism and peace journalism reports to illustrate how the same story can be reported in either style, and that there is the potential to produce peace journalism within the time and travel constraints of mainstream journalism.

For a peace journalism/war journalism pair on conflict in the Philippines see Peace Journalism in the Philippines. The transcripts of this report pair, along with an outline of a course in peace journalism can be viewed at A course in peace journalism.

The free Reporting the World publication contains pairs of peace journalism/war journalism news reports on Macedonia, the Democratic Republic of Congo, Iraq, and Indonesia.

The Cairo based Center for Intercultural Dialogue and Translation (CIDT) seeks to build bridges of understanding between the Arab and Western world through analysis of the news from these regions. To Be an Effective Advocate for Peace, Media Distortions Must Be Addressed analyses situations where conflict reporting has contributed to the actual worsening of conflict.

An example from the Hindustan Times, showing how peace journalism can also operate through awards and commendations publicising and supporting the work of non-violence and cooperative conflict resolution: Afghan, Palestinian win UN award in honour of Gandhi.

Peace journalism can also take the form of the public dissemination of research on the successful conditions for non-violent conflict resolution and negotiation such as: Unequal Partners Can't Negotiate by Paul Duffill, writing for New Matilda.

For an example in Australia see this report on the protests of the 2009 US and Australian military exercises, Talisman Sabre.

TED talk by Julia Bacha on the danger of news about conflict only covering violent actors, excluding non-violent programmes Julia Bacha: Pay attention to nonviolence.

Budrus documentary film, telling the true story of the successful non-violent struggle of the people of the village Bubrus in the West Bank of Palestine.

Arab revolutions and the power of nonviolent action by Stephen Zunes, writing for the National Catholic Reporter.

Anne Applebaum argues in this piece for the Washington Post that though it is tempting to lump all the recent revolutions in the Middle East and North Africa into a single "Arab revolution," or "Arab Spring" the differences between them may turn out to be more important than their similarities: In the Arab world, it's 1848 - not 1989.

This report from Michelle Shephard Somalia's Al Qaeda: A chance for Shabab to negotiate? is an example of a partial PJ piece, where some elements of PJ are present. The piece does not assume there are only two parties, and does not assume parties' goals exactly match reported positions, and explores contradictory goals within a single official party. It also reports on peaceful responses to conflict. This report however is generally closed in space and time: with little exploration of the reasons behind the conflict between warring groups (including considering the conduct of the weak national government), or whether parties other than Al Queda/Al Shabab have used violence, and assumes that causes and sources of solutions are restricted to within Somalia itself. The report also does not explore non-elite efforts at peace, even though Somalis rally against al-Qaeda allies suggests that there is local support for peace efforts.

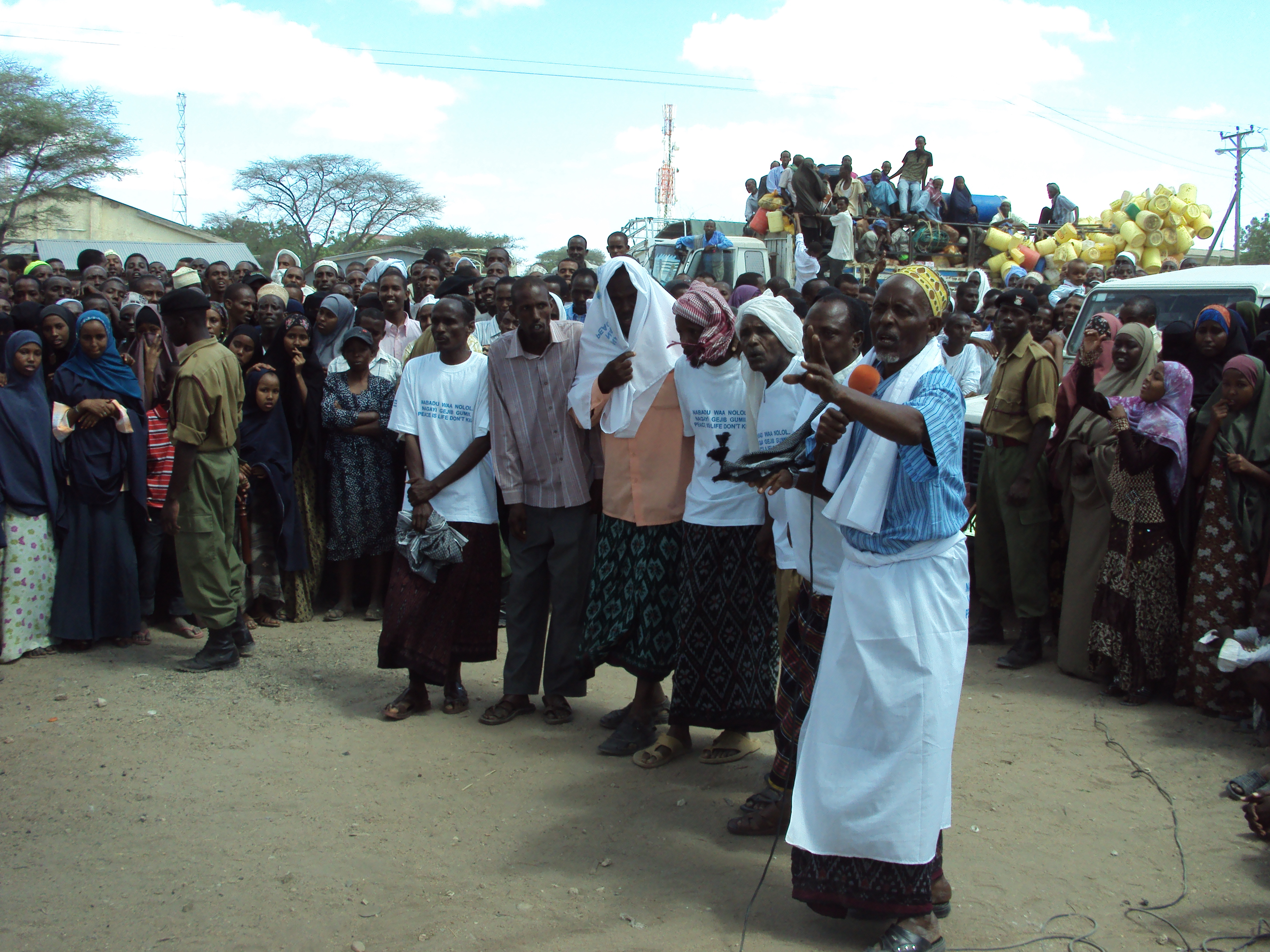
A peace journalism project conducted by the Kenya Pastoralist Journalist Network

Positive feedback loops are a useful reference point here for conceptualising the various entry points for peace journalism in the wider phenomenology of news. Peace journalism has been applied in training and dialogue with journalists in a variety of settings. However peace journalism has also been applied in a number of other sectors.

These interventions are extremely varied and, in addition to the examples noted above, include international NGO work with local partners and networks in areas of conflict, the promotion of communication rights, participatory processes, community-based communication approaches for development, and social change and peacebuilding (for example see Current Projects-Communication for Social Change & World Association for Christian Communication programmes and further reading sections below) and work with organisations who may themselves become sources for peace journalism. Government and inter-governmental approaches have also facilitated peace journalism in preventing media manipulation and promoting people centered media in post-conflict societies and through the United Nations. Likewise upper level editors and media organisation managers have participated in peace journalism workshops and seminars.

== Criticism ==
Debates surrounding peace journalism arise from concerns about ethics and how the field is structured. Ethical concerns pertain to the objectivity of peace journalism and how violence is portrayed while structural concerns focus on concepts of media structure, public reception, and different approaches to the field.

=== Objectivity ===
One criticism of peace journalism is that the field functions as a form of advocacy journalism and is therefore not reliable due to the personal bias of journalists that is injected into the work. The main goal of peace journalism is seen to go against the standard of good journalism, a journalistic practice that doesn't aim to persuade the audience one way or another, instead presenting the facts as they are in a neutral manner. This is done through three main principles: objectivity, neutrality, and detachment. Instead, the practices of peace journalism are understood to be more inline with that public relations. These critiques are reflected in the Press Institute of India's conflict reporting guidelines that states: "Factual accuracy in a single story is no substitute for the total truth. A single story, which is factually accurate can nonetheless be misleading". Similar concerns surrounding objectivity are raised by Dr. Thomas Hanitzsch, particularly that there is an "overemphasis on individualism and voluntarism" within the field.

In doing so peace journalism aims to de-naturalise meaning by highlighting the creation of war journalism dominated meaning in conflict. Indeed Hall (1997) recommends that the unfixing of meaning: "is often a struggle to increase the diversity of things which subjects can be of the possibility of identities which people have not seen represented before ... you have to intervene in exactly that powerful exchange between image and its psychic meaning ... with which we invest images [and] expose and deconstruct the work of representation which the stereotype is doing".

Many international negotiation experts and peace practitioners state that non-violent confrontation and the equalisation of power is needed before effective negotiation and dialogue between parties can take place. Through reporting on grassroots and local voices for peace, the power of these voices is increased, as they become "reality checkers" for often contradictory statements from elite representatives involved in violence. Through this non-violent "ideational confrontation", audiences and parties to conflict may be more able to negotiate their own meaning, outside of fixed elite narratives. Thus "mounting anomalies may expose contradictions, and herald a paradigm shift" as local pro-peace perspectives previously consigned to a zone of "deviance" become "legitimate controversy".

Prior to the presidential election of 2009 in Afghanistan, the counter-insurgency approach advocated by US commander General McCrystal contained elements of relationship building to a degree that is unusual among military approaches in Afghanistan. In the lead up to the presidential election in Afghanistan in mid 2009, an unusual example of this relationship-sensitive approach to counter-insurgency was applied by US troops in the Nawa district, of Helmand province. However, the overwhelming majority of attention that Nawa district received in 2009, the year that this new strategy was first applied, was on reports of violence there, principally in early-to-mid July, during intensified military operations. For example in 2009, seven out of ten articles in the 'Washington Post online', tagged under the key word "Nawa", focussed almost exclusively on violence and US combat operations in the region, with similar ratios appearing in online coverage from the Guardian, the Independent, and the New York Times. In fact, relationship building has succeeded, in contrast to violent methods, in winning "hearts and minds" in Nawa, Afghanistan, but also on a larger scale in Iraq. The US military's promotion of these methods as successful may of course be a less than "objective" evaluation. However the military's promotion of relationship building as a legitimate tactic to attempt in addressing violence does contribute to the normative strength of non-violence responses to conflict. In acknowledging the importance of (at least being seen to) build cooperative relationships with local populations (over simply violently suppressing disagreement to military policy) the legitimacy of these non-violent responses to violence conflict is reinforced. And indeed researchers also note the importance of relationship building for 'vertical and horizontal integration' in peacebuilding to support the sustainability of institutional reform and in promoting 'peace with justice' and respect for human rights.

Peace journalism aims to retain the role of observer in reporting conflict, rather than functioning like war journalism, which intervenes in conflict to increase the influence of violent actors and violent actions. Peace journalism, by presenting local perspectives which contradict violence-exacerbating war journalism, may help to expose these violent groups' attempts to fix and naturalise meaning and to take advantage of this meaning to promote their violence. Exploration of new types of relationships between Afghan locals and the international community contradicts assertions made at the time, with the support of war journalism, by insurgents and the US government, that the negative effects of foreign occupation could only be ended with their violent expulsion, or that 40,000 more combat troops were the most critical component for sustainable peace in Afghanistan.

=== Explaining violence seen as justification of violence ===
This criticism can be represented by neo-conservative proponent Richard Perle, that one must "decontextualise terror ... any attempt to discuss the roots of terrorism is an attempt to justify it. It simply needs to be fought and destroyed". While this may be a common response to journalism which advocates context, it is also an example of many of the social-cognitive inter-group biases noted above, and exemplifies what social psychologist Phillip Zimbardo (of the Stanford Prison Experiments) calls a Fundamental Attribution Error: "the tendency to explain observed behaviour by reference to dispositions, while ignoring or minimizing the impact of situational variables".

The notion of human needs driving violence and being significantly effected by violence (borrowed from Conflict Analysis and Peace Research) and insight into the stratified nature of reality (borrowed from Critical Realism), highlights why an explanation of violence is not the same thing as a justification for it.

Critical realism in the social sciences claims that reality consists of a number of levels or strata. Each stratum deals with larger and more complex phenomena than the ones below it. These strata might begin from physical mechanisms at the most basic level, followed by chemical mechanisms, then biological, followed by psychological and finally social structures. Activity at each lower stratum contributes to, but can never fully describe, the new mechanisms that develop in higher strata, in a process called emergence. For example, competing theories of sub-atomic structure at the physical level influence but cannot fully explain the outcome of the reaction 2Na+2HCl = 2NaCl + H2 (at the chemical level). Likewise, the individual psychologies of a landlord and tenant cannot fully explain their relationship in the social stratum, which is also influenced by other processes that operate at the social stratum, including laws and culture.

Structural and cultural explanations for violence generally deal with the social stratum: that is relationships between people and groups. An explanation of this violence is not the same as ignoring the role of individual choice and psychology: the violence that emerges at the social level is the result of a complex interaction of influences from lower strata (individual choices and psychology) and structures which exist primarily at the social stratum (such as laws and culture). So to give cultural or structural explanations of violence is not the same as saying that these social influences override the role the individual choice (which is located in a lower stratum and therefore occurs under different conditions).

Take the case where an individual's anger (brought on from previous trauma) becomes bitterness, which is followed by their own violent acts, following Elworthy and Rogers (2002) cycle of violence noted above. An individual has still made a choice to deprive the victim of their violence of their human needs (probably safety and security) even though their own human needs have also been violated earlier. The point is not that they must be seen as either an innocent victim or an evil perpetrator. The practical point is the prevention of violence, and the healing of all those whose needs have been violated.

This approach does not assume that the best solution for stopping individual violence necessarily exists at the level where an individual makes a choice to act violently (which happens at the psychological level). In some cases punishment or imprisonment may be necessary. However Peace and conflict studies suggest that, given the failure of the psychological, medical and social sciences (including education) to eliminate the persistent rates of psychotic tendencies in human groups (psychologists estimate that on average 3 percent of any population have psychotic tendencies), a more promising approach may to look at what social, economic, cultural conditions and what inter-group relations enable individuals such as Hitler, Osama Bin Laden, Stalin and Pol Pot, to realise their desire for mass violence.

Peace and conflict studies does not primarily focus on understanding the individual psychology of these individuals (at the psychological stratum), but on how these individuals may be prevented from taking up a position in society where they are able to direct inter-communal violence (at the social stratum).

Indeed in peace journalism the role of individual agency is given a lot of importance. For example journalists are encouraged, in peace journalism workshops, to work peace journalism into the existing media structures. And peace journalism urges journalists to investigate the possibility that, even in violent situations, there are always voices for peace, and to search these voices out, when reporting what the Objectivity Conventions might ignore from the outset. Likewise the role of individual choice is not ignored in Peace and conflict studies, and leading scholar-practitioner, John Paul Lederach notes that: "I have not experienced any situation in conflict, no matter how protracted or severe, from Central America to the Philippines to the Horn of Africa, where there have not been people who had a vision for peace, emerging often from their own experience of pain. Far too often, however, these same people people are overlooked and disempowered either because they do not represent 'official' power, whether on the side of government [or] of the various militias, or because they are written off as biased and too personally affected by the conflict".

=== Structure versus agency ===
Hanitzsche (2007) argues that "the failures of corporate journalism cannot be overcome by an individualistic and voluntaristic conceptualization of news making. To have any impact on the ways news is being made, and the critical discussion thereof, the advocates of peace journalism must address the structural constraints of news production ... a peaceful culture is the precondition of peace journalism." Structure is a key concern in peace journalism, along with the influence of structure on content pluralism in news. And a number of projects that apply peace journalism (some of which are outlined above) demonstrate that peace journalism activism is not limited to journalists themselves. Indeed, conflict media content analyses are important educational resources for audiences, NGOs and journalists, to show how deficiencies in content can be used to campaign for more structural pluralism.

These varied approaches demonstrate that inroads have been, and are still being made, in peace journalism activism in the areas Hackett (2006) identifies as necessary to address challenges of structure and to "make peace journalism possible": reforming journalism from within, and also creating alternative media organisations, and intervening in the broader fields in which journalism find itself.

=== Audiences ===
Devereux (2003) notes that media audiences "may have different expectations of media genres" and Turnbull (2002) argues that in media research a serious problem is just to limit and define audiences and therefore relevant media practices. Indeed Hall (1997) notes that the meaning of media messages changes "as you move from one person to another, one group to another, one part of society to another." And Lynch (2008) points out, drawing from Hall (1980) that "the meanings of media messages are made, at least partly, at the point of reception, in a process influenced chiefly by the socio-economic position of the reader or viewer." As such Hall (1980) notes that in a negotiated or oppositional manner, meaning often: "contains a mixture of adaptive and oppositional elements: it acknowledges the legitimacy of the hegemonic definitions to make the grand significations (abstract), while, at a more restricted, situational (situated) level, it makes its own ground rules - it operates with exceptions to the rule. It accords the privileged position to the dominant definitions of events while reserving the right to make a more negotiated application to 'local conditions'". And indeed for many peace journalists it is the visibility of 'local conditions' that allows for oppositional and negotiated meaning. Lynch (2008)argues that "for audiences to produce oppositional or negotiated readings of media messages assumes they have enough directly relevant personal and social experience against which to measure them", This is often not the case with international conflict. Indeed Hall's(1980) own example of the negotiation of meaning is the case of an industrial factory worker, willing to challenge official justifications in the media for an Industrial Relations Bill limiting his or her right to strike.

Peace journalism analysis shows that the facts absent in audiences' understanding of conflict, can closely mirror those neglected in war journalism. A notable example is Philo and colleagues' research into media coverage of the Israel/Palestine conflict in the UK media. With mainstream media neglecting the Palestinian narrative that Palestinian refugees lost their land and homes when Israel was established, audiences exhibited consistent ignorance about the basic facts of the conflict (for example where the bulk of refugees came from) and tended to perceive Palestinians as "starting the violence" and therefore Israeli authorities as forced to "respond" violently to prevent or contain this action, which has no possible rationale and therefore no potential non-violent resolution. Indeed five years earlier, when reporting results of the study, Philo (2004) noted that: "This pattern of reporting clearly influenced how some viewers understood the conflict ... The gaps in public knowledge closely parallel those in the news. The Palestinian perspective, that they have lost their land and are living under occupation, was effectively absent. It is perhaps not surprising that some viewers believed that they were simply being aggressive and trying to take land from the Israelis". This omission of the Palestinian perspective was so serious that Helen Boaden, Head of News at the BBC, concluded in an internal email: "we fail to give enough context and history to this highly charged story and that we neglect the Palestinian narrative ... In our response, we've tried to come up with practical ways to remedy our weaknesses". The Israeli–Palestinian conflict has also been the focus of research by Yifat Mor and colleagues, who examined how social media (namely Facebook) can be a tool to promote dialogue between both parties.

This is an important illustration of the consistent effect of war journalism across general audiences: "the pattern of misunderstanding almost exactly matching ... missing elements from the story habitually presented in the mainstream media". General media audiences as a group are conceptualised within the Feedback Loop of cause and effect.

=== Approaches ===
Two peace practitioner scholars, John Paul Lederach and Johan Galtung present two quite different models for conflict resolution and peace building. Lederach (1995) presents an "Elictive Model" which is aims "primarily at discovery, creation, and solidification of models that emerge from the resources present in a particular setting and respond to needs in that context" and to not impose third party knowledge from trainer to participant. This approach was applied in a dialogue in 2003 entitled "Reporting the[sic?] Iraq: what went right? What went wrong?". Included were Heads of News from the BBC and CNN, the editor of the Guardian, and several senior reporters who had also been reporting the war from Iraq. Drawing on "the resources in the room" recommendations for the coverage of conflict included:

1. Do not report a 'line' from an official source without obtaining and citing independent evidence as to its reliability.
2. Acknowledge that the important job of testing arguments is best done if they are juxtaposed with, and weighed against, alternative, countervailing arguments.
3. All newsrooms genuinely interested in offering a service to the public must think long and hard about 'conduit' journalism and, in particular, whether their political correspondents are being used in this way.

Galtung's TRANSCEND approach in contrast, focuses on the role a third party to "unstick" violent conflicts and stimulate creativity. This is done by probing deeply into the nature of parties' goals, expanding the spectrum of acceptable solutions, and opening up cognitive space for fresh potentialities not conceived of by conflict parties. "In one-on-one conversation-style dialogues, the task is to stimulate creativity, develop new perspectives, and make the conflict parties 'ready for the table'".

Lynch (2008) recounts a notable example of this approach during a peace journalism forum of Middle Eastern journalists, in Amman, in 1999. Discussions often devolved into national groups blaming the journalists of the other countries for not confronting their governments' lack of movement towards peace. Galtung himself challenged the participants to: "imagine a future Middle East they wanted to see, and start to think aloud, in cross-national groups, about how they might play a part in bringing it about".

A Galtungian perspective, as a foundation for much of peace journalism, insists that "the journalist focus on root causes of conflict such as poverty or prior abuse, and not merely focus on events associated with violent political encounters". Through this approach peace journalism could act to "disembed" seemingly immutable official positions from the greater context of a conflict by exploring background to a conflict, challenging propaganda, and making visible official and local initiatives for peaceful conflict resolution.

These two approaches differ not only in the "how" of Conflict Resolution but the "who". Lederach generally outlines a "middling out" approach where "the level with the greatest potential for establishing an infrastructure that can sustain the peacebuilding process over the long term appears to be the middle range". He argues that grassroots approaches are generally the more fragile since their participants are often concerned with day to day issues of survival. Upper level approaches assume a high level of integration between elites and grassroots: that peace agreements reached there "are relevant to and capable of practical implementation at the local level" Galtung on the other hand argues that upper level leaders often actually feel excluded from facilitated peace processes, with the modern focus on grassroots and civil society initiatives. The root of conflict is incompatible goals, pursued by parties which result in violent attitudes and behavior. It follows that "people are more able to discuss a root problem when they sense a solution somewhere. A glimmer of light at the end of a tunnel makes it considerably more easy[sic] to admit that we are in a tunnel". In Galtung's work, the most accessible way to influence these goals had been to work with those who officially defined them and led policy—the upper level leaders.

The importance of accurate and complete conflict theories for a given conflict highlights how these two approaches can be complementary. Practical conflict theories are often aimed at identifying the easiest "peace levers" to pull, within a conflict to "unstick" violent inter-group relations. This contrasts with intervening in a conflict with pre-set ideas of how a resolution will be found, and with which specific level or group to begin working.

Therefore conflict theories may indicate which "entry points" offer the most promising chance to transform the relations between parties. And from this it will follow which approach, or combination of approaches, are likely to work from that entry point (whether it be at the grassroots, mid level or upper level or a combination). This integrative approach is summed up by peace practitioner and researcher Wendy Lambourne: "to rely on only one theoretical approach in peace practice risks being culturally blind".

== Similar approaches ==
Sometimes also called conflict solution journalism, conflict sensitive journalism, and constructive conflict coverage. A similar approach is also found in preventive journalism, which extends the principles to social, economic, environmental or institutional problems. Peace journalism is one of several approaches and movements in journalism history, including advocacy journalism, development communication journalism, the new journalism, and public or civic journalism, which reject the universal or hegemonic claims to neutrality of professional journalism in the developed West.

== See also ==
- Alfred Hermann Fried – the first explicit peace journalist
- Antimilitarism
- Anti-war movement
- Appeasement
- Conflict resolution
- Conscientious objector
- Deterrence theory
- Draft evasion
- Freedom of the press
- Journalistic interventionism
- Make love, not war
- Nonkilling
- Non-violence
- Nonviolent resistance
- Objectivity (journalism)
- Swords into ploughshares
- War resister
