= Investigative journalism =

Form of journalism in which reporters deeply investigate a single topic

Investigative journalism is a genre of journalism in which reporters deeply investigate a single or few topics of interest, such as hidden problems and truths, serious crimes, education, racial injustice, corruption and abuse of power, social welfare, and corporate wrongdoing. An investigative journalist may spend months or years researching and preparing a report. Practitioners sometimes use the terms "watchdog reporting" or "accountability reporting".

Most investigative journalism has traditionally been conducted by newspapers, wire services, and freelance journalists. With the decline in income through advertising, many traditional news services have struggled to fund investigative journalism, due to it being very time-consuming and expensive. Journalistic investigations are increasingly carried out by news organizations working together, even internationally (as in the case of the Panama Papers, Paradise Papers and Pandora Papers), or by nonprofit outlets such as ProPublica, which rely on the support of the public and benefactors to fund their work.

== Definitions ==
University of Missouri journalism professor Steve Weinberg defined investigative journalism as: "Reporting, through one's own initiative and work product, matters of importance to readers, viewers, or listeners." In many cases, the subjects of the reporting wish the matters under scrutiny to remain undisclosed. There are currently university departments for teaching investigative journalism. Conferences are conducted presenting peer-reviewed research into investigative journalism.

British media theorist Hugo de Burgh (2000) states: "An investigative journalist is a man or woman whose profession is to discover the truth and to identify lapses from it in whatever media may be available. The act of doing this generally is called investigative journalism and is distinct from apparently similar work done by police, lawyers, auditors, and regulatory bodies in that it is not limited as to target, not legally founded and closely connected to publicity."

== History ==
Early newspapers in British colonial America were often suppressed by the authorities for their investigative journalism. Examples include Publick Occurrences Both Forreign and Domestick and Benjamin Franklin's New England Courant. Journalists who reported on the doings of the British authorities would later contribute to revolutionary sentiment in the run-up to the American Revolution; one prominent example was the Boston Gazette, contributed to by Samuel Adams among others.

American journalism textbooks point out that muckraking standards promoted by McClure's Magazine around 1902, "Have become integral to the character of modern investigative journalism." Furthermore, the successes of the early muckrakers continued to inspire journalists.

The outlook for investigative journalism in the United States was improved by the 1960s with the Freedom of Information Act and New York Times Co. v. Sullivan. The invention of the photocopier also offered an assistive tool to whistleblowers.

The growth of media conglomerates in the U.S. since the 1980s has been accompanied by massive cuts in the budgets for investigative journalism. A 2002 study concluded "that investigative journalism has all but disappeared from the nation's commercial airwaves."

Worker-owned and nonprofit journalism have worked to address the resulting need for in-depth investigations and reporting. One of the largest teams of investigative journalists is the Washington-based International Consortium of Investigative Journalists (ICIJ) launched in 1997 by the Center for Public Integrity which includes 165 investigative reporters in over 65 countries working collaboratively on crime, corruption, and abuse of power at a global level, under Gerard Ryle as Director. Working with major media outlets globally, they have exposed organised crime, international tobacco companies, private military cartels, asbestos companies, climate change lobbyists, details of Iraq and Afghanistan war contracts, and most recently the Panama Papers and Paradise Papers.

The Investigative Commons center opened in Berlin, Germany in 2021 and houses the European Center for Constitutional and Human Rights, Forensic Architecture, and Bellingcat.

Other associations of investigative journalism outlets include the Institute for Nonprofit News, and the Association of Nonprofit News Organizations.

== Tools ==
An investigative reporter may make use of one or more of these tools, among others, on a single story:

- Analysis of documents, such as lawsuits and other legal documents, tax records, government reports, regulatory reports, and corporate financial filings.
- Databases of public records.
- Investigation of technical issues, including scrutiny of government and business practices and their effects.
- Research into social and legal issues.
- Subscription research sources such as LexisNexis.
- Numerous interviews with on-the-record sources as well as, in some instances, interviews with anonymous sources (for example whistleblowers).
- Federal or state Freedom of Information Acts to obtain documents and data from government agencies.
- OSINT (Open-Source Intelligence) databases and tools that contain free and open resources that anybody can use.
- Hidden cameras

== Examples ==
- Ida B. Wells-Barnett's 1892 pamphlet Southern Horrors documented lynching in the United States, exposing in the pages of black-owned newspapers as a campaign of oppression and intimidation against African Americans. A white mob destroyed her newspaper press and office in retaliation for her reporting.
- Ida Tarbell's 1904 book, The History of the Standard Oil Company, exposed the nefarious practices and methods of the monopoly of the company, and led to its dismantling.
- Upton Sinclair's 1905 book The Jungle exposed unsanitary conditions in American meatpacking plants, and led to the creation of the Food and Drug Administration.
- Nellie Bly, a pseudonym used by Elizabeth Cochrane Seaman in the late 19th century, famously feigned insanity as part of her 1887 undercover investigation into and subsequent exposé regarding the inner-workings of the Women's Lunatic Asylum in New York City. Published to wide acclaim as a series of articles in the New York World which were later compiled and further detailed in her book Ten Days in a Mad-House, Bly's revelations led to both a grand jury investigation of the asylum and increased funding for the Department of Public Charities and Corrections.
- Between 1972 and 1974 Bob Woodward and Carl Bernstein uncovered and exposed a variety of incriminating information regarding President Richard Nixon's 1968–1972 presidential campaign. The information exposed, prompted Nixon's resignation in 1974 and was then on recognized as the Watergate scandal.
- Bill Dedman's 1988 investigation, The Color of Money, for The Atlanta Journal-Constitution on racial discrimination by mortgage lenders in middle-income neighborhoods, received the 1989 Pulitzer Prize for Investigative Reporting and was an influential early example of computer-assisted reporting or database journalism.
- Brian Deer's British press award-winning investigation for The Sunday Times of London into the worldwide MMR vaccine controversy which revealed that research, published by The Lancet, associating the children's vaccine with autism was fraudulent.
- John M. Crewdson of the Chicago Tribune wrote a 1996 article proposing the installment of defibrillators on American airliners. Crewdson argued that based on his research and analysis, "Medical kits and defibrillators would be economically justified if they saved just 3 lives each year." Soon after the article's publication, airlines began installing defibrillators on planes, and the devices began to show up in airports and other public spaces. Ten years after installing defibrillators, American Airlines reported that 80 lives had been saved by the machines.
- Hopewell Chin'ono, the award-winning Zimbabwean journalist who investigated and exposed the Covid-gate scandal in Zimbabwe in June 2020. US$60 million was siphoned to a shadowy company called Drax that is linked to President Emmerson Mnangagwa. The exposure resulted in the dismissal and arrest of Health Minister Obbidiah Moyo. Hopewell Chin'ono was arrested on flimsy charges in an apparent attempt to silence him.
- The Boston Globe's Spotlight investigation into sexual abuse in the Archdiocese of Boston, which earned a Pulitzer Prize

== See also ==
- List of years in investigative journalism
- Glossary of journalism
- Preventive journalism
- Strategic lawsuit against public participation

Organizations, Publications and People

- Global Investigative Journalism Network
- List of American journalism awards#Investigative journalism
- Rodolfo Walsh
- The Hidden Is More Immense
