= Preventive journalism =

Preventive journalism is a journalistic discipline that reports on urgent social problems at an early stage and on solutions proposed for these problems. It complements traditional investigative journalism and recognizes that journalism can alert government and society to problems before they become crises.

Michael O'Neill, editor of the New York Daily News from 1975 to 1982 and former president of the American Society of Newspaper Editors, wrote in 1985 that preventive journalism should "search in advance for the hidden forces of change [and] try to identify the underlying causes of crises before, rather than after, they explode so that an alerted society might have time to protect itself from the ambushes of history."

The concept was also used in a 1996 Kofi Annan speech where he stressed the need for such a kind of journalism without further detailing its characteristics.

Peace journalism follows similar tenets as preventive journalism, though preventive journalism extends its action range to social, economic, institutional, human rights, and environmental concerns.
