= Jake Lynch =

Novelist, academic, journalist and poet (born 1965)

Jake Lynch (born 1965) is a novelist, academic, journalist and poet, and a scholarly authority within the fields of peace journalism and peace research. He is an associate professor at the University of Sydney. Mind Over Murder and Diagnosis or Death, his detective stories set in contemporary Oxford and co-authored with Annabel McGoldrick, featuring EMDR Psychotherapist Janna Rose, are published by Next Chapter. His debut novel, Blood on the Stone, an historical mystery thriller set in Oxford in 1681, was published by Unbound Books.

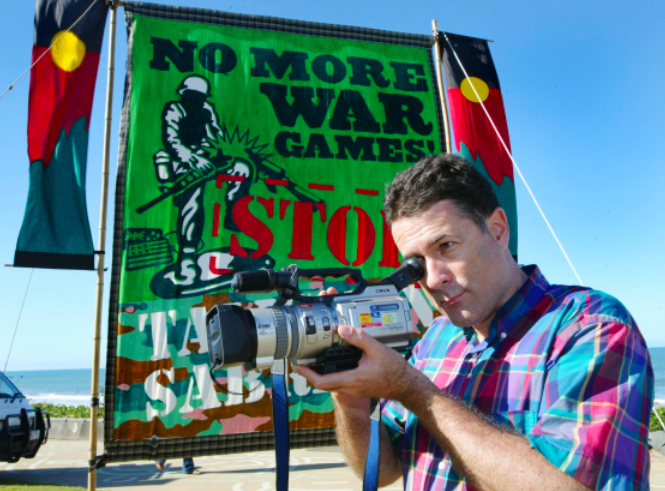
Peace journalist Jake Lynch covering protests against joint US-Australia military exercises in Australia.

== Education ==
Lynch attended Cardiff University, where he completed a BA degree in English (First Class Honours) in 1988 and a Postgraduate Diploma in Journalism Studies (Distinction) in 1989. He subsequently attended City University, London, where he completed a PhD degree in 2008.

== Professional career ==
Lynch worked as a journalist for two decades (from 1989), including as Sydney Correspondent for The Independent, a Political Correspondent in London for Sky News and as a television newsreader with BBC News. Since 2007, he has worked in academia, and currently holds the position of Associate Professor within the Faculty of Arts and Social Sciences at Sydney University. He was formerly Director of the Centre for Peace and Conflict Studies at the University. Lynch has also previously served as Secretary-General of the International Peace Research Association, and has held visiting professorships and fellowships with the universities of Coventry, Cardiff, Bristol and Johannesburg. Lynch has since turned towards creative writing, with a debut novel published in 2019 and detective stories in 2025 and 2026. His poetry appears in literary journals.

== Honours and awards ==
Lynch has received numerous awards, most recently the Luxembourg Peace Prize for his work in peace journalism.

== Activism ==
Lynch has been active in human rights campaigns, in the Boycott, Divestment and Sanctions (BDS) campaign, and in campaigns for Palestinian rights. In 2013, Shurat HaDin, an Israeli NGO, commenced legal action in the Federal Court of Australia against Lynch, alleging a breach of Australia's anti-racism laws over Lynch's active support for the BDS campaign. The case, however, was subsequently dismissed by His Honour Justice Alan Robertson, with costs in favour of Lynch.

== See also ==
- List of peace activists

== Bibliography ==
- Lynch, J. and Annabel McGoldrick (2026) Diagnosis or Death. London: Next Chapter.
- Lynch, J. and Annabel McGoldrick (2025) Mind Over Murder. London: Next Chapter.
- Lynch, J. (2019) Blood on the Stone. London: Unbound Books.
- Lynch, J. (2017). Terrorism, the "Blowback" thesis and the UK media. Peace Review, 29(4), pp. 443–449.
- Lynch, J. (2017). News coverage, peacemaking and peacebuilding. In Robinson, Piers; Seib, Philip; Frohlich, Romy (eds.), Routledge Handbook of Media, Conflict and Security, (pp. 197–209). Abingdon: Routledge.
- Lynch, J. (2018) Foreword. Peace Journalism Principles and Practices, (pp. xv-xvii). New York: Routledge.
- Lynch, J. (2018). Where I stand on peace journalism and the academic boycott of Israel. Conflict and Communication, 17(1), pp. 1–4.
- Lynch, J. (2018). Peace Journalism. Oxford Research Encyclopedia of Communication: Journalism Studies. New York: Oxford University Press.
- Lynch, J. (2019). Public Service Broadcasting and Security Issues: The Case of 'Blowback'. In Shaw, Ibrahim Seaga; Selvarajah, Senthan (eds.), Reporting Human Rights, Conflicts, and Peacebuilding: Critical and Global Perspectives, (pp. 85–101). Cham: Palgrave Macmillan.
- Hussain, S., Lynch, J. (2019). Identifying peace-oriented media strategies for deadly conflicts in Pakistan. Information Development, 35(5), pp. 703–713.
- Lynch, J. (2014) A Global Standard for Reporting Conflict. New York: Routledge.
- Lynch, J. (2008) Debates in Peace Journalism. Sydney: Sydney University Press.
- Lynch, J. and Annabel McGoldrick (2005) Peace Journalism. Stroud: Hawthorn Press.
