= Lawrence Gobright =

American journalist (1816–1879)

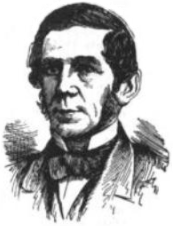
- Born: Lawrence Augustus Gobright; 22 May 1816; Baltimore, Maryland
- Died: 22 May 1879 (aged 63); Washington, D.C.
- Occupation: Journalist

Lawrence Augustus Gobright or Lawrence A. Gobright (1816–1879) was an American journalist. He is noted for his work as a Washington correspondent for the Associated Press. Aside from his work as a reporter for other newspapers, he was also a part-owner and editor of the Washington Evening Star. Gobright had also published several books, including Recollections of Men and Things, Jack and Jill, and For Old and Young.

== Biography ==
Gobright was born on 22 May 1816 in Baltimore, Maryland. He learned the printing trade in the city. He was cited as the editor of the Batavia Ohio Sun, which was known as Martin Van Buren campaign newspaper. After this stint, he moved to Washington, D.C., where he reported on the Washington beat for the Baltimore Clipper and other newspapers. By 1845, he was cited as one of the editors of the Washington Daily Bee, a penny paper. For many years, he was also the owner and editor of the Washington Star. He was the Washington agent of the Associated Press from 1848 until 1878.

During the Civil War, his peers called him “Pop” and “Father Gobright” due to his gray hair. Golbright had worked with President Abraham Lincoln, who sometimes invited him to accompany him. The President provided him with news although the dispatches did not attribute anything to the source. When Lincoln received, for instance, a report that General Ulysses S. Grant’s army was defeated near Vicksburg, Mississippi, Gobright was present. The President was reportedly agitated and forbade the reporter to publish the news. Gobright was said to have reminded him that “more than half of the war rumors are false.” The report proved to be erroneous.

Gobright was noted for his nonpartisan reporting. In a congressional hearing, he explained: “My business is to communicate facts… My dispatches are sent to papers for all manner of politics and the editors say they are able to make their own comments upon the facts which are sent to them.” He was also known for his close links with many politicians. It is claimed that younger reporters accused him of being a “government agent”.

=== Lincoln assassination ===
One of the most notable moments in Gobright’s career was his reporting of the Abraham Lincoln assassination. An account described the event on April 14, 1865, when Gobright had just finished an article about General Grant’s absence at a Ford’s Theatre performance. He was said to be expecting a slow night, reviewing minor news article to be dispatched to the Associated Press in New York. A friend brought in the news of Lincoln’s assassination and he promptly telegraphed to his subscribers the following:

WASHINGTON, APRIL 14, 1865
TO THE ASSOCIATED PRESS: THE PRESIDENT WAS SHOT IN A THEATER TONIGHT AND PERHAPS MORTALLY WOUNDED.

Gobright had no other details about the incident when this lead was dispatched. He would file a more detailed news for the dailies later. Later, many historians cited his accounts of the assassination. Gobright also testified before the military tribunal that heard the case of Dr. Samuel Mudd, an alleged Lincoln assassination conspirator. Scholars note the innovations to his reporting after the assassination, which included the use of the lead and the inverted pyramid structure. Prior to this, news reporting followed the chronological format.

=== Retirement ===
Gobright’s retirement from Associated Press was recorded in detail. By early 1878, dissatisfaction of his work emerged due to the perception that he was incapable of meeting the post-Civil War demands for news that addressed the wider spectrum of regional interests and journalistic tastes. The Associated Press tried to remedy the situation by hiring two additional reporters at the news outlet’s Washington Bureau, “Hayes and Divine, the two best reporters in Washington”. Problems persisted and sometime in June 1878, Walter Polk Phillips was sent to Washington to replace Gobright.

Gobright died on May 22, 1879, at Washington, D.C.

== Publications ==
Men and Things in Washington During the Third of a Century is considered to be Gobright’s best known book.

- Recollections of Men and Things at Washington During the Third of a Century (1869)
- Jack and Jill (1873)
- For Old and Young (1873)
- Echoes of Childhood: Old Friends in New Costumes from the Risen and Rising Generation (1879)
