= Ruben Salvadori =

Italian media professional and photojournalist

Ruben Salvadori is an Italian media professional and photojournalist known for his project 'Photojournalism Behind the Scenes', through which he challenged the dramatic aesthetics of conflict images and the expectation of objective truth by including the photographer in the frame. Salvadori has ignited a discussion about the ethics of the profession and the need for the audience to be an active viewer by acknowledging the inevitable subjectivity of the photographic medium.
