= David Mindich =

American professor and historian

- Born: David T.Z. Mindich
- Occupations: Professor; historian
- Years active: 1996–present

David Mindich is an American professor and historian. He is the chair of the journalism department at Temple University and the former chair of the journalism department at Saint Michael's College, and the author of Tuned Out: Why Americans Under 40 Don't Follow the News.

== Career ==
Mindich was a professor and the chair of the journalism department at Saint Michael's College, where he taught from 1996 to 2017. While at Saint Michael's, he served as the faculty advisor for the Defender, the school's newspaper, as well as the Echo, its rival. As of 2021, he is the chair of the journalism department at Temple University. He is also the author of Tuned Out: Why Americans Under 40 Don't Follow the News and Just the Facts: How "Objectivity" Came to Define American Journalism.

== Personal life ==
Mindich is Jewish.

== Works ==
- Just the Facts: How "Objectivity" Came to Define American Journalism (NYU Press, 1998) ISBN 0-8147-5614-X
- Tuned Out: Why Americans Under 40 Don't Follow the News (Oxford University Press, 2004) ISBN 0-19-516141-6
- The Mediated World: A New Approach to Mass Communication and Culture (Rowman & Littlefield, 2020)
