= AuthorAID =

AuthorAID is the name given to a number of initiatives that provide support to researchers from developing countries in preparing academic articles for publication in peer-reviewed journals. Phyllis Freeman and Anthony Robbins, co-editors of the Journal of Public Health Policy (JPHP), first suggested the name and concept in 2004 and published "Closing the ‘publishing gap’ between rich and poor" about AuthorAID on the Science and Development Network (SciDev.Net), in 2005.

Development aid programs of international organizations, industrial countries, and charitable foundations have invested in strengthening research capacity in developing countries to help those countries solve their own problems. Scientists from developing countries, however, remain under-represented as authors in the published scientific literature. AuthorAID was proposed because unless research results from authors anywhere are available through publication, the full benefit of investment in research is not achieved.

AuthorAID programs engage senior scientists and authors’ editors as mentors to help developing country researchers overcome barriers to publication in scientific journals. The internet connects mentors and authors where it is not possible to have face-to-face contact.

The funded AuthorAID program at the International Network for Advancing Science and Policy also organizes workshops in various developing countries, in addition to hosting an online mentoring scheme and e-resources. AuthorAID at INASP is independent of the other AuthorAID programs and is described below.

== The publishing gap ==
Scientific research is conducted all over the world, and increasingly in developing countries. In an effort to help countries solve problems and speed development, development aid has been invested in research capacity, notably by Sweden and Canada. The results of this research must be available through publication to be useful in economic development and to other researchers. Yet only a very small fraction of the scientific literature is written by developing world authors, even in fields such as health and environmental studies, where many of the world's critical problems are concentrated in developing regions.

An analysis, published in Science in 2005, of 4061 health-related journals from 1992 to 2001 showed a growing gap in scientific publications between low-income countries and the rest of the world. Similarly, Athula Sumathipala and her colleagues found under-representation of developing world authors in leading medical journals such as the BMJ, Lancet, New England Journal of Medicine, Annals of Internal Medicine, and JAMA, in 1999 and 2000.

=== Causes of under-representation ===
There is no single cause of the under-representation of developing world authors. Bias exists on the part of both editors and reviewers who choose what to publish. Frank Gannon, writing as the editor of EMBO Reports, pointed out one worrisome source of bias against researchers from developing countries. He suggested that editors and reviewers discriminate 'by judging colleagues on their work address,' noting that 'the address of the first or last authors is not always a neutral piece of information when assessing a paper.'

Differences in publication priorities between developed and developing countries are not always a sign of bias. The editors of a guide to publishing in the addiction sciences noted that "US research is primarily (and legitimately) oriented towards that country’s own social and economic priorities, which do not necessarily apply to cultures in the developing world. The problem of US dominance is thus not only one of maldistribution of opportunity." Some writers, analyzing the issues of science information transfer from a sociolinguistic and sociopolitical standpoint, consider this cultural dominance to reflect an "Anglo-American English language hegemony." The problem is further compounded by variations in the quality of the feedback peer reviewers are able to provide about the language and writing, since this advice does not always help to make the writing better.

Writing in English, overwhelmingly the language of scientific publication, can make it difficult for non-native English speakers to 'compete on an equal research basis.' In the early 1990s Gosden surveyed editors of biology, chemistry and physics journals to identify aspects of manuscripts "which may seriously detract attention from judgment of a paper’s essential merits." He found that journal editors reported several problems encountered by NNS researchers, including inadequate knowledge of the unwritten "rules of the publication game" (for instance, failure to cite sufficient references to earlier research and unfamiliarity with the argumentation style or scientific level of the journal.)

The editors of the PARINT publishing guide noted that international publishing both requires technical skill in following journal instructions and represents 'an acquired competence in social communication.' They warned that "if the formalities are not followed, even a study containing strong and original findings might immediately be turned down." One potential obstacle to acceptance is that "many English-speaking editors and reviewers (in the same way as many French, German, or Swedish speaking editors) will have a rather strict idea of what constitutes good language."

=== The problem as encountered by authors ===
Freeman and Robbins, when developing the AuthorAID concept, summarized what they learned about the problems faced by authors in developing countries as:

- Uncertainty about which journals may be suitable for a submission
- Unfamiliarity with editorial conventions
- Persistent pressure to write in English
- Conflicts with collaborators about authorship and author order
- Lack of scientific and statistical tools to analyze data as required by journals
- Editors’ and publishers’ inattention to development problems and developing country topics.

Editors and other research publication experts might help researchers overcome linguistic challenges and cultural differences, and help them understand the procedural, ethical, and technical intricacies of academic publication. Freeman and Robbins reported that in developing world research institutions there are simply too few editor/scientist mentors (well-published authors or experienced editors) available to assist in disseminating the work of emerging research talent whose findings might be brought to bear on the world’s major problems.

=== The problem as seen by journal editors ===
Editors of international journals reported to Freeman and Robbins that they sometimes reject submissions from developing country authors even when the content shows merit. Some noted that despite investment in research capacity in developing countries, many manuscripts reflect inadequate attention to research design and analysis. Conflicting priorities and lack of resources to provide substantive editing have also been discussed as a potential source of bias by members of the World Association of Medical Editors (WAME). Editors in WAME who work with researchers, as well as journal editors serving as gatekeepers, noted that manuscripts requiring extensive editing have lower chances of acceptance.

At smaller journals in particular, manuscripts are likely to be rejected if they seem to require more editing than the editors or publisher can afford to provide. Another potential source of bias is perceived narrowness of scope: some editors lament the paucity of submissions sufficiently broad in scope to warrant international dissemination. Manuscripts that report research on a local or regional topic are often rejected by international journals before the editors have carefully scrutinized the research design and data collection.

Journal editors from the Forum of African Medical Editors (FAME) and the Eastern Mediterranean Association of Medical Editors (EMAME), both of which are supported by the World Health Organization, report they do most of the editorial tasks themselves, and have little time to assist authors with substantial revisions. Lack of editorial staff to help authors may prolong the review process or result in rejection of manuscripts whose research findings could be applied to solving practical problems or to further research.

=== The problem as viewed by publishers ===
The tradition of intensive editing in many fields and at many scholarly journals and publishing houses (see academic publishing) has given way to commercial imperatives to produce at lower cost more "content" that can be repackaged and resold or licensed to others to generate additional revenue. To reduce costs, publishers have pushed greater editorial responsibility upon authors. Journals proliferate, but editorial resources are often strained, leading to a propensity to accept manuscripts that require less work. This may impose an additional burden on readers trying to understand the published articles.

Research institutions in wealthy countries have responded to this publishing environment by purchasing editorial help from freelance editors or specialized firms when in-house services don't exist.

In some models of open access publishing the author pays the publisher a "manuscript processing fee," which contributes little revenue to invest in editing. These fees tend to exclude less affluent authors from the start. However, not all models of open access publishing require financial support from authors, and some open access publishers waive their fees when payment would represent a hardship for authors.

== History ==
The editors of the Journal of Public Health Policy (JPHP) first presented the AuthorAID idea, provisionally named EditAID, at a meeting of the World Federation of Public Health Associations in Brighton, England in April 2004. Public health professionals from the federation’s 69 national associations expressed interest in the AuthorAID concept. Some wanted to benefit from mentoring and others offered to help scientists with less writing experience.

The second public presentation of AuthorAID took place in Mexico in November 2004 at the Global Forum for Health Research. This allowed AuthorAID's developers to reach their intended users: researchers from developing countries and the national and international agencies that invest in research. Robbins and Jerry Spiegel, a Canadian colleague from the Canadian Coalition for Global Health Research, talked to the forum about the potential benefits of AuthorAID. In addition, a group of Rockefeller Foundation International Health Research Awardees presented their research to a concurrent ministerial summit. These researchers, from 25 developing countries, had been helped by JPHP in an AuthorAID-like developmental editing experiment. In the wake of this experience, interest focussed on the search for more substantial ways to test the AuthorAID concept.

In 2005, many editors of US scientific journals were engaged in activities to support journal editors and publications in developing countries. For its May 2005 meeting in Atlanta, Georgia, the council of Science Editors (CSE, formerly the Council of Biology Editors) invited a presentation of AuthorAID. Ana Marusic, co-editor of the Croatian Medical Journal, organized a special session on AuthorAID. Editors from FAME encouraged CSE to participate in AuthorAID. CSE’s board voted to develop the concept into a CSE project. Paul Bozuwa of Dartmouth Journal Services, who chaired a CSE Task Force on Science Journals, Poverty, and Human Development, took the lead for CSE on AuthorAID.

The Science and Development Network posted an article by the JPHP editors in its Opinions section describing AuthorAID to the broader science and development communities. The JPHP editors followed up with an editorial in their journal in which they explained the problems faced by developing world researchers when they try to publish their work in scientific journals.

In 2006, AuthorAID experiments started to take shape, with certain central elements shared across all programs. AuthorAID is not commercial, relying exclusively on volunteer scientific and editorial mentors to help developing world authors. All AuthorAID projects match mentors (senior scientists with editorial experience often in or near retirement, or experienced science editors) with researchers seeking help to present their work. Mentors forswear authorship, agreeing to accept acknowledgment from the researchers whom they assist. Together the mentors and authors work on a manuscript via the internet or e-mail (unless they are able to meet in person) through to publication.

The European Association of Science Editors (EASE) invited a presentation of AuthorAID at its 2006 Annual Meeting in Kraków, Poland and subsequently endorsed the concept. Short descriptions of AuthorAID have been published in the journals of both CSE (Science Editor) and EASE (European Science Editing).

The International Society for Environmental Epidemiology, with almost 1000 members worldwide, created an AuthorAID for its developing world members, relying on the expertise of senior members as mentors. In 2007, this became one of the first operational experiments with the AuthorAID concept.

In late 2008 AuthorAID and Scientists without Borders, a project developed by the New York Academy of Sciences, discovered each other and agreed to investigate ways to work together. In autumn 2009 work began on the development of an organizational profile for the AuthorAID concept and its various projects on the Scientists without Borders website. In addition, support from the Eastern Mediterranean Association of Medical Editors (EMAME), the Regional Office for the Eastern Mediterranean of the World Health Organization, and the Bahrain Medical Society made it possible for Karen Shashok, a translator and author's editor located in Granada, Spain, to attend the EMMJ4 conference in Manama, Bahrain and start work on the AuthorAID in the Eastern Mediterranean project.

== AuthorAID at INASP ==
The International Network for Advancing Science and Policy (INASP), an international development charity based in Oxford, UK, has run a funded AuthorAID program called AuthorAID at INASP since January 2007. Following the independent evaluation of the pilot phase from 2007 to 2009, the program was extended until the end of 2012.

AuthorAID at INASP is funded by the Swedish International Development Cooperation Agency (Sida), the Norwegian Agency for Development Cooperation (NORAD), and the UK's Department for International Development (DFID). AuthorAID at INASP is not connected to the other AuthorAID programs. Instead, it is an integral part of INASP's Programme for the Enhancement of Research Information, which facilitates the availability, accessibility, creation, and uptake of research in developing countries.

Like other AuthorAID initiatives, the AuthorAID program at INASP includes a mentoring scheme, that has connected thousands of members from over 150 countries. In 2012, the British Academy invited AuthorAID at INASP to talk about mentoring at the Career Development Workshop for Early Career Researchers in West Africa, and a talk on mentoring was also given at the 11th General Assembly of the European Association of Science Editors.

Since 2007, the AuthorAID staff from INASP have organized many workshops on research writing (i.e., writing research papers for publication in peer-reviewed journals) in various countries in Africa, South Asia, and Latin America. Workshops have also been organized locally by researchers working in INASP's partner countries. The impact of AuthorAID at INASP workshops on the publication output of participants is periodically evaluated. Researchers who attend the train-the-trainers workshop, which are often part of AuthorAID at INASP's research writing workshops, are encouraged to pass on their knowledge. The hundreds of free e-resources on research communication available on the AuthorAID at INASP site can be used by anyone for non-profit workshops and educational activities.

Since 2010, AuthorAID at INASP have provided grants to support research communication. Grants have been awarded for researchers to present at conferences, organize local AuthorAID workshops, and attend an intensive course on research writing.

A pilot e-learning course on research writing was conducted in 2011, and results were reported at an e-learning conference.

In 2025, after consultation with the AuthorAID community, INASP decided to rename the project "Rising Scholars" to reflect "the broader ways we support early career researchers – beyond academic writing – to include research skills, career development, networking, and more."

== AuthorAID in the Eastern Mediterranean (AAEM) ==
From January to June 2009 the first on-site phase of this volunteer project, co-coordinated by Karen Shashok and Dr Farhad Handjani, was able to get underway thanks to support from Shiraz University of Medical Sciences in Shiraz, Iran. The results of the first on-site phase of this project were presented at the European Association of Science Editors 2009 conference, and were reported in European Science Editing and elsewhere. The second on-site phase, again supported by Shiraz University of Medical Sciences, took place from November 2010 to July 2011. Work during this phase formed the basis of several articles, and also resulted in plans for collaborative research between an author's editor at the Clinical Research Development Center of Nemazee Hospital (one of the teaching hospitals affiliated with Shiraz University of Medical Sciences) and an AAEM editor in Spain. The AuthorAID in the Eastern Mediterranean website was inaugurated in late October 2012.

Experienced volunteer editors who contribute their time to AAEM are located in several countries and edit research manuscripts at no cost to the authors. In Iran, the project has provided manuscript editing combined with training in writing, revising, good scientific English style, appropriate referencing and citation, and research publication ethics. Sets of AAEM advice developed for authors and editors cover aspects of technical editing such as abbreviations, reference formats and identifying sources of materials, as well as aspects of research writing and publication such as plagiarism, self-plagiarism, appropriate secondary publication and choosing the most appropriate journal. While the next on-site phase of AAEM is being planned, its volunteers continue to provide manuscript editing support via email for researchers in the Eastern Mediterranean region.

== See also ==
- Academic publishing
- Committee on Publication Ethics
- Council of Science Editors
- European Association of Science Editors
- European Science Editing
- International English
- Open access (publishing)
- Peer review
- Rhetoric of science
- Science and Development Network
- Scientific literature
- Scientists without Borders
- World Association of Medical Editors
