= Balaban =

Balaban may refer to:

== Places ==
=== Azerbaijan ===
- Balaxanı, Azerbaijan, formerly Balaban

=== Iran ===
- Balaban, Khoy (Persian: بلبان)
- Balaban, Piranshahr (Persian: بالابان)

=== Syria ===
- Balaban, Syria, village in northern Aleppo Governorate, Syria

=== Turkey ===
- Balaban, Büyükorhan
- Balaban, Eğil
- Balaban, Kartepe, a village in Kocaeli Province
- Balaban, Nusaybin

== Other uses ==
- Balaban (instrument), a double reed wind instrument of the duduk family
- Balaban (surname)

== See also ==
- Balabanov
- Ballabon
