= European Science Editing =

- Discipline: Media studies
- Language: English
- Edited by: Ksenija Baždarić

Publication details
- Former names: Earth Science Editing; Earth & Life Science Editing
- History: 1975–present
- Publisher: European Association of Science Editors
- Frequency: Continuous
- Open access: Yes
- License: CC-BY 4.0

Standard abbreviations
- ISO 4: Eur. Sci. Ed.

Indexing
- ISSN: 0258-3127 (print); 2518-3354 (web)
- LCCN: 86649464
- OCLC no.: 13154588

Links
- Journal homepage; Online access; Online archive

European Science Editing is a peer-reviewed open access academic journal published by the European Association of Science Editors. It covers all aspects of scientific editing and publishing. The journal publishes research articles, meeting reports, essays and viewpoints, book and website reviews, as well as highlighting events, resources, and publications of interest to members. The editor-in-chief is Ksenija Baždarić (University of Rijeka).

== History ==
The journal was established in 1975 as Earth Science Editing, published by the European Association of Earth Science Editors. In 1977 it was renamed Earth & Life Science Editing, obtaining its current title in 1986. The journal was issued triannually until 2001, when it moved to a quarterly schedule. Originally, the publication served as a newsletter to the association, before becoming an academic journal in 2002. In 2020 the journal became fully open access and online only. The journal does not charge any article processing charges.

== Abstracting and indexing ==
The journal is abstracted and indexed in Library and Information Science Abstracts, Modern Language Association Database, and Scopus.

== See also ==
- Association of Learned and Professional Society Publishers
- Committee on Publication Ethics
- Council of Science Editors
- European Medical Writers Association
- International Committee of Medical Journal Editors
- Mediterranean Editors and Translators
