= American Medical Writers Association =

Professional association for medical communicators

The American Medical Writers Association (AMWA) is a professional association for medical communicators, with more than 4,000 members in the United States, Canada, and 30 other countries. AMWA is governed by a board of directors composed of the elected officers, 6–8 at-large directors, and the chapter advisory council chair. AMWA has regional chapters and provides local networking opportunities throughout the United States and Canada. The association was founded in 1940 by physicians interested in improving the quality of medical writing and editing.

AMWA includes a variety of medical communicators, including administrators, advertisers, authors' editors, college and university professors, journal editors, pharmaceutical writers (and those involved in pharmaceutical publication planning), public relations specialists, publishers, reporters, researchers, statisticians, and translators. Many members are freelance writers and editors. Membership in AMWA is open to anyone interested in any aspect of medical communication.

AMWA's headquarters are located in Gaithersburg, Maryland, United States.

== History ==
On the evening of September 25, 1940, in the Mississippi River town of Rock Island, Illinois, Drs. Harold Swanberg, George B. Lake, N. C. Barwasser, Norman Zolla, Florence Johnson, and James Dunn organized the Mississippi Valley Medical Editors' Association (MVMEA).

The MVMEA was absorbed by the new AMWA, which was formed at Springfield, Ill., September 29, 1948, during the meeting of the Mississippi Valley Medical Society in that city. At this time The Mississippi Valley Medical Journal was made the official publication of AMWA. During the 1948 meeting, Morris Fishbein, M.D., then editor of The Journal of the American Medical Association, gave a two-hour course on medical writing at the meeting. Dr. Fishbein was president of AMWA, 1958–1959.

Up until 1951, the constitution of AMWA was written so that only physicians could be members. The constitution adopted for 1951–1956 allowed, besides physicians, "medical librarians and health educators," and, importantly, "personnel of hospitals, foundations, technical companies and allied organizations, educational institutions, publishing and who are concerned with medical writing or publishing ..."

In 1976 the first president was elected who did not have a doctoral degree (Gerald McKee); in 1977 the first woman president, Virginia T. Eicholtz, was elected.

== Code of ethics ==
The AMWA Code of Ethics sets forth the principles that "take into account the important role of medical communicators in writing, editing, and developing materials in various media and the potential of the products of their efforts to inform, educate, and influence audiences." The original Code of Ethics was published by Eric W. Martin, PhD, in 1973. The third revision was published in June 2008.

== Membership ==
Membership is open to anyone interested in medical communications. Professional and student memberships are available.

AMWA members receive benefits including free resources and learning opportunities. Members have access to Engage, AMWA's online member community. In addition, members receive reduced prices on AMWA and affiliate products, events, and services.

== Education program and certificates ==
AMWA offers an extensive continuing education program for professionals in the medical and allied scientific communication fields. More than 90 educational sessions are offered during AMWA's annual conference, including intensive learning workshops that can be applied toward AMWA's certificate program. Earning the AMWA Essential Skills Certificate is considered an important part of a career path in the field. The program requires 8 credits of Essential Skills courses, which may be earned through completion of self-study workbook quizzes and/or by participation at in-person workshops.

Access to on-demand resources is available through AMWA Online Learning, which includes videos, articles, tutorials, and interactive activities on a variety of topics. Most resources are available to both members and nonmembers, however members can access them at a reduced price. AMWA also offers live online webinars, networking and learning events, and onsite training programs for medical writing professionals.

== Publications ==
The AMWA Journal is the official publication of AMWA. A quarterly publication, it "aims to be an authoritative, comprehensive source of information about the knowledge, skills, and opportunities in the field of medical communication worldwide."

The Essential Skills workbooks are published by AMWA and designed for self-study. They include examples and exercises, as well as a quiz. Successful completion of the quiz awards credit towards earning the AMWA Essential Skills Certificate.

== Annual conference, networking, and job opportunities ==
As the world's largest professional association of medical communicators, AMWA offers unique educational and networking opportunities for those new to the profession, mid-career, and advanced career professionals. Jobs Online is an online service for announcing employment or freelance opportunities to medical communicators interested in finding new employers or clients.

The AMWA Freelance Directory is an open-access online tool that allows individuals or companies to find a professional freelance medical communicator for any scientific, medical, or health care related project.

AMWA holds the Medical Writing & Communication Conference annually. The 2018 conference was held November 1–3, 2018 in Washington, D.C. and the 2019 conference was held November 7–9, 2019 in San Diego, CA. The conference is open to all medical communicators, regardless of membership.

== Awards ==
AMWA's award program recognizes exceptional achievements and contributions to the field of medical communication.

- The John P. McGovern Award is presented to a member or nonmember of AMWA to honor a preeminent contribution to any of the various modes of medical communication.
- The Walter C. Alvarez Award is presented to a member or nonmember of AMWA to honor excellence in communicating health care developments and concepts to the public.
- The Harold Swanberg Distinguished Service Award is presented to any active member of AMWA who has made distinguished contributions to medical communication or rendered unusual and distinguished services to the medical profession.
- The President's Award is given by the AMWA president to a member of AMWA for distinctive contributions to the association at the chapter or national level).
- The Golden Apple Award is awarded to workshop leaders who have demonstrated excellence in teaching in the AMWA education program.
- The Fellowship program recognizes members who have made significant contributions to the goals and activities of AMWA in addition to other professional accomplishments.

== Chapters and local networking ==
AMWA has 15 regional chapters and local networking opportunities throughout the United States and Canada. Chapters organize meetings and conferences in their region.

- Carolinas Chapter
- Delaware Valley Chapter
- Empire State-Metropolitan New York Chapter
- Florida Chapter
- Greater Chicago Area Chapter
- Indiana Chapter
- Mid-America Chapter
- Mid-Atlantic Chapter
- New England Chapter
- North Central Chapter
- Northern California Chapter
- Ohio Valley Chapter
- Pacific Southwest Chapter
- Rocky Mountain Chapter
- Southeast Chapter
- Southwest Chapter

== Medical Writer Certified (MWC) ==
The Medical Writing Certification Commission (MWCC), in collaboration with AMWA, developed the Medical Writer Certified (MWC) credential that defines the scope of medical writing practice and distinguishes individuals in the field. The MWC program is an exam-based certification designed for professional medical writers holding a bachelor or advanced degree and with at least two years of paid medical writing experience. Professionals who hold this credential have demonstrated their understanding of medical writing core competencies.

== The role of professional medical writers ==
In 2017, AMWA collaborated with the European Medical Writers Association (EMWA) and the International Society of Medical Publication Professionals (ISMPP), to create the AMWA-EMWA-ISMPP Joint Position Statement. In summary, the statement asserts that, "professional medical writing support helps authors and sponsors to disclose their research in peer-review journals and scientific congresses in an ethical, accurate, and timely manner, with the ultimate aim of advancing patient care."

The statement describes the appropriate role of professional medical writers in the development of medical and scientific publications, including:

- Articles and supplementary content (e.g., video abstracts) for publication in peer-reviewed journals
- Abstracts, posters, and oral presentations for dissemination at scientific congresses

Previously, AMWA published a position statement on the contributions of medical writers to scientific publications in the 2003 AMWA Journal. This article explained the work of the AMWA 2002 Task Force on the Contributions of Medical Writers to Scientific Publications as it prepared, adopted, and presented the position statement.

The position statement addressed the controversy of guest authorship and the use of medical ghostwriters, particularly when pharmaceutical companies fund the research. Critics charge that the use of biomedical communicators encourages commercial bias. Advocates claim that professional biomedical communicators provide a valuable service that improves the quality and timeliness of publication of research. The debate centers around how to define authorship.

In 2005, the World Association of Medical Editors tightened its policy on ghost writing of medical research papers after a US journal highlighted allegedly illegitimate ghostwriting practices.

The New York Times reported on a study released by editors of The Journal of the American Medical Association that found a significant number of articles in top medical journals published in 2008 were written by ghostwriters. Cindy Hamilton (AMWA president at the time) replied to this article in a letter to the editor by stating, in part:

Ghostwriting is unethical and must be distinguished from collaboration between researchers (authors) and professional medical writers, whose contributions and financing are disclosed. Authors determine content, and writers ensure that it is communicated effectively and promptly. This partnership advances science by facilitating timely publication of research findings, ultimately benefiting the public.

Reuters has reported that some medical journal editors are resorting to computer forensics to help reveal ghost writers on manuscripts.

Despite conflicting viewpoints on ghostwriting and guest authorship in medical communications, common ground can be found. This viewpoint was neatly summed up in the September 2009 issue of Mayo Clinic Proceedings:

Despite the intense debate and accusations about ghostwriting and guest authoring, there is consistent agreement among many organizations on 2 issues: (1) Medical writing is a valuable, accepted function that can assist in the timely, well-organized, clear communication of scientific studies. (2) Medical writing or editorial assistance that does not merit named authorship should be acknowledged, along with the source of funding support for such work.

== See also ==
- American Association for the Advancement of Science
- Board of Editors in the Life Sciences (BELS)
- Council of Science Editors
- Editors' Association of Canada
- European Association of Science Editors
- European Medical Writers Association
- Society for Technical Communication
- Uniform Requirements for Manuscripts Submitted to Biomedical Journals
