= Board of Editors in the Life Sciences =

- Formation: January 23, 1991
- Type: Certifying Body
- Headquarters: 2345 Rice Street, Suite 220, St. Paul, MN 55113
- Location: United States
- President: Melanie Fridl Ross, MSJ, ELS

The Board of Editors in the Life Sciences (BELS) is a professional organization that awards credentials to exemplary manuscript editors in the life sciences (e.g., medicine, biology, agriculture). Here, the term "manuscript editor" refers to both authors' editors and editors employed by academic publishers (often called copy editors or editor-in-chief). Individuals who demonstrate excellence in editing and an understanding of the ethical principles of publishing—both of which are assessed through a certification exam—are awarded the title Editor in the Life Sciences and may use the initials ELS after their names. BELS also allows use of its electronic badge by BELS-certified editors (those who have passed its certification examinations).

BELS was founded in 1991 and offers certification examinations several times each year at various locations across the United States and in other countries. In 2020, the Board of Editors in the Life Sciences also began offering the examination via Prometric, a global testing service provider. The exam is available quarterly each year, with the option to test at a Prometric site or via remote assessment. Once certified and as a member in good standing, BELS members can access other members' contact information, job openings, and links to similar editorial associations through the BELS website. All organizational functions of BELS are performed by volunteers among its members.

== Credentials offered ==
=== Editor in the Life Sciences ===
Those wishing to attain the BELS certification (ELS) credential are required to pass a certification examination. To be eligible to sit for the exam, applicants must have earned a bachelor's degree (or equivalent) and must have at least 2 years of experience as a manuscript editor in the life sciences. Registration for the certification exam requires candidates to submit a resume, an application fee, and three letters of reference from professionals who can attest to the candidate's experience as manuscript editor. Most applicants hold degrees in physical or life sciences, English, or journalism. The 3-hour exam consists of 105 multiple-choice questions. Daily work as an editor is the best preparation for the exam, but BELS also offers a Study Guide that gives a list of references that might be helpful.

=== Diplomate Editor in the Life Sciences ===
ELS-certified editors may apply for diplomate status, ELS(D), by submitting a portfolio of edited material and documenting at least 6 years of experience as a manuscript editor in the life sciences. A person whose portfolio passes detailed review and evaluation is deemed a Diplomate Editor in the Life Sciences, ELS(D).

=== Honored Editor in the Life Sciences ===
BELS grants the title of Honored Editor in the Life Sciences, ELS(H), to distinguished editors of its choosing. Those with this status may use the credential ELS(H).

== History ==
The concept of BELS was formulated in the early 1980s, and the organization was founded on January 23, 1991, in Maryland. Charter members were Martha Brookes, Gillian Brown, Gil Croome, Susan Eastwood, Norman Grossblatt, Carol Kakalec Kohn, Walter Pagel, Frances Porcher, Barbara Reitt, and Martha Tacker.

The first BELS exam was held on May 4, 1991, in Denver, CO. Twenty-three candidates attempted certification and 14 passed the exam. In 1992, BELS hosted its first annual meeting in Pittsburgh, PA, which a majority of the membership attended.

The first BELS exam conducted in Australia was held in 2001; 3 of 5 candidates passed. By 2005, the BELS membership included 13 Australians. In November 2008, BELS offered two exams in India. All applicants held degrees in science, and about two-thirds passed the exam, a pass rate similar to that in the U.S. at the time.

BELS initiated a newsletter, the BELS Newsletter (later known simply as the BELS Letter), in the spring of 1993, distributing it to members and related organizations.

== Membership growth ==
A total of 33 editors were certified in the life sciences in 1991, the first year in which the organization offered the exam. By April 2001, BELS had more than 300 members, and a total of 51 scheduled exams had been held. By July 2006, BELS membership had reached 550, and by 2007, the number of editors holding the ELS credential had increased to almost 700. By 2011, there were about 1,000 BELS-certified editors worldwide. As of July 2022, more than 1,600 BELS-certified editors can be found in the U.S. and 36 other countries.

== See also ==
- ACES: The Society for Editing
- American Medical Writers Association
- Committee on Publication Ethics
- Council of Science Editors
- European Association of Science Editors
- Mediterranean Editors and Translators
- National Association of Science Writers
