= Ghostwriter =

Writer who writes for the credited author

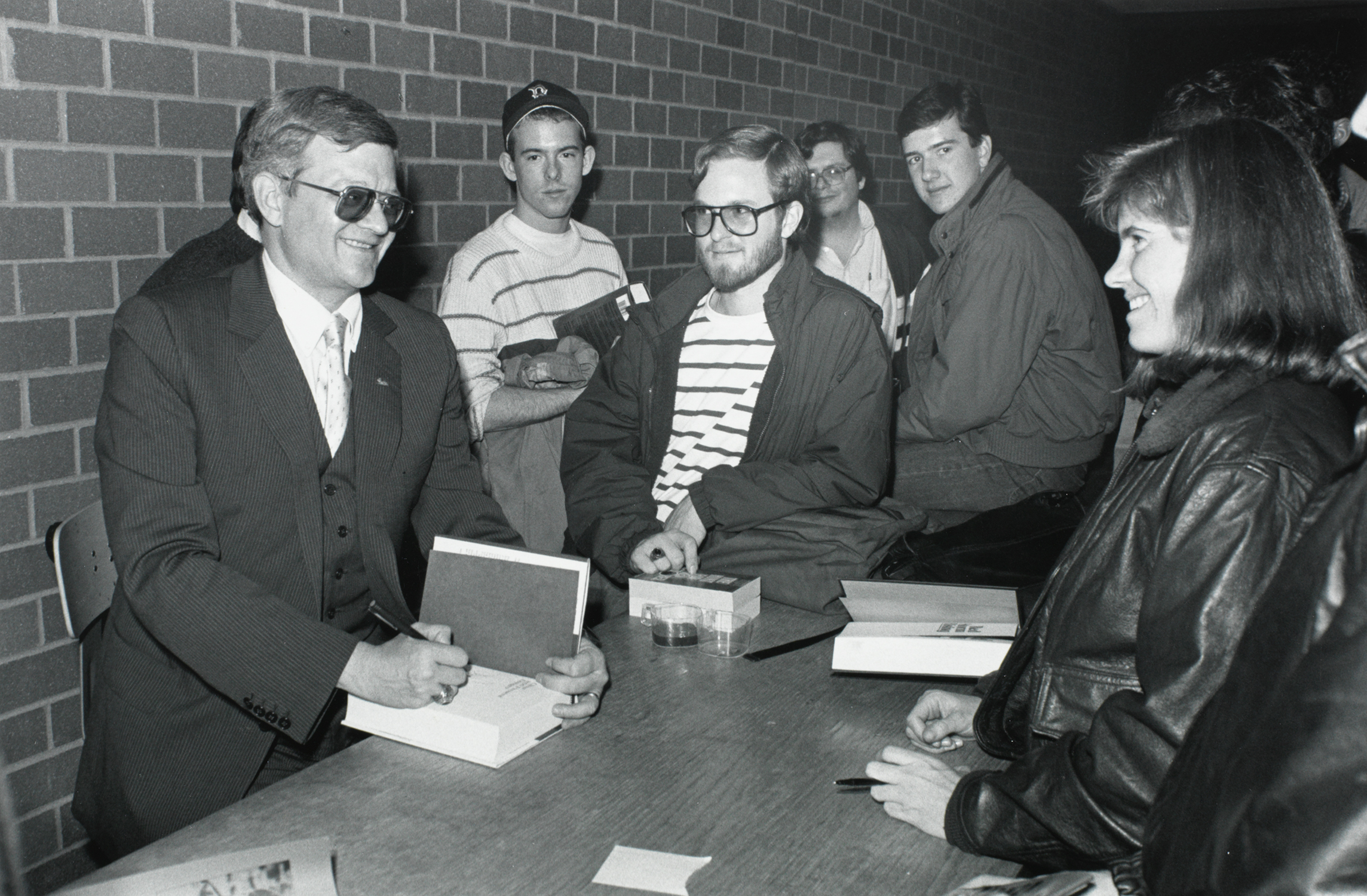
Action novelist Tom Clancy at a book signing. A significant part of Clancy's bibliography was provided by ghostwriters after market demand for books under Clancy's name exceeded his ability to produce them.

A ghostwriter is a person hired to write literary or journalistic works, speeches, or other texts that are credited to another person as the author. Celebrities, executives, participants in timely news stories, and political leaders often hire ghostwriters to draft or edit autobiographies, memoirs, magazine articles, or other written material.

A ghostwriter is expected to closely replicate the writing style and voice of an author's previous works while still providing new literary content. Memoir ghostwriters in particular pride themselves on "disappearing" into the persona of the credited author as a mark of craftsmanship. In music, ghostwriters are often used to write songs, lyrics, and instrumental pieces. Screenplay authors can also use ghostwriters to either edit or rewrite their scripts to improve them. Usually, there is a confidentiality clause in the contract between the ghostwriter and the credited author (or publisher) that obligates the former to remain anonymous, or obligates the latter to not reveal the ghostwriter. Sometimes the ghostwriter is acknowledged by the author or publisher for their writing services, euphemistically called a "researcher" or "research assistant", but often the ghostwriter is not credited.

Ghostwriting (or simply "ghosting") also occurs in other creative fields. Composers have long hired ghostwriters to help them to write musical pieces and songs; Wolfgang Amadeus Mozart is an example of a well-known composer who was paid to ghostwrite music for wealthy patrons. Ghosting also occurs in popular music. A pop music ghostwriter writes lyrics and a melody in the style of the credited musician. In hip hop music, the increasing use of ghostwriters by high-profile hip-hop stars has led to controversy. In the visual arts, it is not uncommon in both fine art and commercial art such as comics for a number of assistants to do work on a piece that is credited to a single artist; Andy Warhol engaged in this practice, supervising an assembly line silk screen process for his artwork. However, when credit is established for the writer, the acknowledgment of their contribution is public domain and the writer in question would not be considered a ghostwriter.

== Overview ==
A consultant or career-switcher may pay a ghostwriter to write a book on a topic in their professional area, to establish or enhance credibility as an expert in their field. Public officials and politicians employ "correspondence officers" to respond to the large volume of official correspondence. A number of papal encyclicals have been written by ghostwriters. A controversial and scientifically unethical practice is medical ghostwriting, where biotech or pharmaceutical companies pay professional writers to produce papers and then recruit (via payment or as a perk) other scientists or physicians to attach their names to these articles before they are published in medical or scientific journals. Some university and college students hire ghostwriters from essay mills to write entrance essays, term papers, theses, and dissertations. This is largely considered unethical unless the actual ghostwriting work is just light editing.

Ghostwriters are hired for numerous reasons. In many cases, celebrities or public figures do not have the time, discipline, or writing skills to write and research a several hundred-page autobiography or "how-to" book. Even if a celebrity or public figure has the writing skills to pen a short article, they may not know how to structure and edit a several hundred-page book so that it is captivating and well-paced. In other cases, publishers use ghostwriters to increase the number of books that can be published each year under the name of well-known, highly marketable authors, or to quickly release a topical book that ties in with a recent or upcoming newsworthy event.

== Remuneration and credit ==
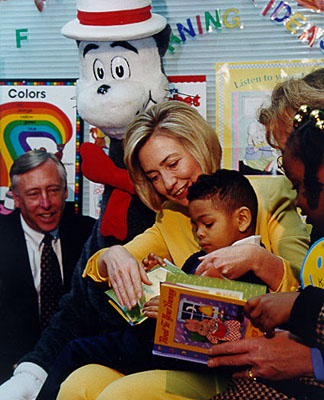
The ghostwriter for Hillary Clinton's memoirs received a $500,000 payment for collaborating with her.

Ghostwriters will often spend from several months to a full year researching, writing, and editing non-fiction and fiction works for a client, and they are paid based on a price per hour, per word, or per page, with a flat fee, a percentage of the royalties of the sales, or some combination thereof. In 2013, literary agent Madeleine Morel stated that the average ghostwriter's advance for work for major book publishers was "between $40,000 and $70,000". These benchmark prices are mirrored approximately in the film industry by the Writers Guild, where a Minimum Basic Agreement gives a starting price for the screenplay writer of $37,073 (non-original screenplay, no treatment).

However, the recent shift into the digital age (15–20% world market share of books by 2015) has brought some changes, by opening newer markets that bring their own opportunities for authors and writers—especially on the more affordable side of the ghostwriting business. One such market is the shorter book, best represented at the moment by Amazon's Kindle Singles imprint: texts of 30,000 words and under. Such a length would have been much harder to sell before digital reader-technologies became widely available, but is now quite acceptable. Ian McEwan has celebrated this recent change, mainly for artistic reasons.

As a consequence, the shorter format makes a project potentially more affordable for the client/author. Manhattan Literary, a ghostwriting company, states that "book projects on the shorter side, tailored to new markets like the Kindle Singles imprint and others (30,000–42,000 words) start at a cost of $15,000". And this shorter book appears to be here to stay. It was once financially impractical for publishers to produce such novella-length texts (they would have to charge too much); but this new market was, by 2015, already substantial and projected to be a solid part of the future of book publishing. So, with its appearance the starting price for the professional book writer has come down by about half, but only if this shorter format makes sense for the client.

On the upper end of the spectrum, with celebrities that can all but guarantee a publisher large sales, the fees can be much higher. In 2001, The New York Times stated that the fee that the ghostwriter for Hillary Clinton's memoirs would receive was probably about $500,000 of her book's $8 million advance, which "is near the top of flat fees paid to collaborators".

A recent availability also exists, of outsourcing many kinds of jobs, including ghostwriting, to offshore locations like India, China, and the Philippines where the customer can save money. The true tests of credibility—the writer's track record, and samples of their craft—become even more important in these instances, when the writer comes from a culture and first language that are entirely different from the client's.

In some cases, ghostwriters are allowed to share credit. For example, a common method is to put the client/author's name on a book cover as the main byline (by [author's name]) and then to put the ghostwriter's name underneath it (with [ghostwriter's name]). Sometimes this is done in lieu of pay or to decrease the amount of payment to the book ghostwriter for whom the credit has its own intrinsic value. Also, the ghostwriter can be cited as a co-author of a book, or listed in the movie or film credits when having ghostwritten the script or screenplay for film production.

For nonfiction books, the ghostwriter may be credited as a "contributor" or a "research assistant". In other cases, the ghostwriter receives no official credit for writing a book or article; in cases where the credited author or the publisher or both wish to conceal the ghostwriter's role, the ghostwriter may be asked to sign a nondisclosure contract that legally forbids any mention of the writer's role in a project. Some have made the distinction between "author" and "writer", as ghostwriter Kevin Anderson explains in a Washington Post interview: "A ghostwriter is an interpreter and a translator, not an author, which is why our clients deserve full credit for authoring their books."

== Ghostwriting by field ==
=== Nonfiction ===
Ghostwriters are widely used by celebrities and public figures who wish to publish their autobiographies or memoirs. The degree of involvement of the ghostwriter in nonfiction writing projects ranges from minor to substantial. In some cases, a ghostwriter may be called in just to clean up, edit, and polish a rough draft of an autobiography or a "how-to" book. In other cases, the ghostwriter will write an entire book or article based on information, stories, notes, an outline, or interview sessions with the celebrity or public figure. The credited author also indicates to the ghostwriter what type of style, tone, or "voice" they want in the book.

In some cases, such as with some "how-to" books, diet guides, or cookbooks, a book will be entirely written by a ghostwriter, and the celebrity (e.g., a well-known musician or sports star) will be credited as author. Publishing companies use this strategy to increase the marketability of a book by associating it with a celebrity or well-known figure. In several countries before elections, candidates commission ghostwriters to produce autobiographies for them so as to gain visibility and exposure. One of John F. Kennedy's books (Profiles in Courage) is almost entirely credited to ghostwriters. Donald Trump's autobiography Trump: The Art of the Deal was produced by a ghostwriter. Several of Hillary Clinton's books were produced by ghostwriters. Nelson Mandela's autobiography (Long Walk to Freedom) was also produced by a ghostwriter.

A consultant or career-switcher may pay to have a book ghostwritten on a topic in their professional area, to establish or enhance their credibility as an "expert" in their field. For example, a successful salesperson hoping to become a motivational speaker on selling may pay a ghostwriter to write a book on sales techniques. Often this type of book is published by a self-publishing press (or "vanity press"), which means that the author is paying to have the book published. This type of book is typically given away to prospective clients as a promotional tool, rather than being sold in bookstores.

=== Fiction ===
Ghostwriters are employed by fiction publishers for several reasons. In some cases, publishers use ghostwriters to increase the number of books that can be published each year by a well-known, highly marketable author. Ghostwriters mostly pen fictional works for well-known "name" authors in genres such as detective fiction, mysteries, and teen fiction.

Additionally, publishers use ghostwriters to write new books for established series where the "author" is a pseudonym. For example, the purported authors of the Nancy Drew and Hardy Boys mysteries, "Carolyn Keene" and "Franklin W. Dixon", respectively, are actually pseudonyms for a series of ghostwriters who write books in the same style using a template of basic information about the book's characters and their fictional universe (names, dates, speech patterns), and about the tone and style that are expected in the book (for more information, see pseudonyms and pen names). In addition, ghostwriters are often given copies of several of the previous books in the series to help them match the style.

The estate of gothic novelist V. C. Andrews hired ghostwriter Andrew Neiderman to continue writing novels after her death, under her name and in a similar style to her original works. Many of action writer Tom Clancy's books from the 2000s bear the names of two people on their covers, with Clancy's name in larger print and the other author's name in smaller print. Various books bearing Clancy's name were written by different authors under the same pseudonym. The first two books in the Tom Clancy's Splinter Cell franchise were written by Raymond Benson under the pseudonym David Michaels.

Sometimes famous authors will ghostwrite for other celebrities, such as when H. P. Lovecraft ghostwrote "Imprisoned with the Pharaohs" (also known as "Under the Pyramids") for Harry Houdini in Weird Tales in the 1920s.

=== Politics ===
Ghostwriting of legislation by interest groups, think tanks, companies, and bureaucrats is prevalent in politics.

=== Religion ===
A number of papal encyclicals have been written by ghostwriters. Pascendi, for instance, was written by Joseph Lemius (1860–1923), the procurator in Rome of the Oblates of Mary Immaculate. In June 1938, Pius XI summoned American Jesuit John La Farge, who began to prepare a draft of Humani generis unitas, which LaFarge and two other Jesuits (Gustav Gundlach and Gustave Desbuquois) worked on in Paris; the draft was approximately 100 pages long. Another Jesuit translated the draft encyclical into Latin, presenting it to Wlodimir Ledóchowski, then the General of the Society of Jesus who had chosen Gundlach and Desbuquois for the project. The draft encyclical was delivered to the Vatican in September 1938. Sebastian Tromp, a Dutch Jesuit, a Thomist theologian and close to Pius XII, is considered to be the main ghostwriter of Mystici corporis.

Michel-Louis Guérard des Lauriers, one of the Vatican's leading theologians of that time, was responsible for the critical study of the New Mass of Pope Paul VI, commonly known as the Ottaviani Intervention, after the supposed attribution to Cardinals Alfredo Ottaviani and Antonio Bacci. The Vatican later answered these accusations and Cardinal Ottaviani later regretted that his name was misused to berate the pope.

Plagiarism researcher Michael V. Dougherty has shown how convoluted the sources of ecclesiastical ghostwriting can be, noting that they are often plagiarized as well as being ghostwritten. The priest Thomas Rosica – himself a proven plagiarist – was the ghostwriter for several speeches by Cardinal Ouellet. "In an unusual twist," wrote Dougherty, "one of the same source texts extensively copied by Rosica for Cardinal Ouellet reappeared in an unoriginal homily by Cardinal William Levada." Levada was at the time the Prefect of the Congregation for the Doctrine of the Faith.

=== Academia ===
Ghostwriting is considered to be academic dishonesty and can lead to repercussions if detected by universities, although it is not illegal in the United States, United Kingdom and Germany.

There are ghostwriting companies and freelancers that sell entrance essays, term papers, theses and dissertations to students. Such services are commonly known as "essay mills".

Although academic ghostwriting involves the sale of academic texts that are written on demand, it differs from plagiarism in that it does not involve an undisclosed appropriation of existing texts. As opposed to cases of plagiarism that stem from a copy-and-paste reuse of previous work, essays and assignments that are obtained through ghostwriting services as a rule have the originality of their text confirmed by plagiarism detection software packages or online services that are widely used by universities.

Universities have developed strategies to combat such academic services, which can be associated with academic fraud, that are offered to students and researchers. Some universities allow professors to give students oral examinations on papers which a professor believes to be ghostwritten. If the student is unfamiliar with the content of an essay that he or she has submitted, then the student can be charged with academic fraud.

=== Medicine ===
With medical ghostwriting, pharmaceutical companies pay professional writers to produce papers and then pay other scientists or physicians to attach their names to these papers before they are published in medical or scientific journals. Medical ghostwriting has been criticized by a variety of professional organizations representing the drug industry, publishers, and medical societies, and it may violate American laws prohibiting off-label promotion by drug manufacturers as well as anti-kickback provisions within the statutes governing Medicare. Recently, it has attracted scrutiny from the lay press and from lawmakers, as well. It is permitted at some institutions, including the University of Washington School of Medicine, while it is prohibited and considered a particularly pernicious form of plagiarism at others, such as Tufts University School of Medicine.

Professional medical writers can write papers without being listed as authors of the paper and without being considered ghostwriters, provided their role is acknowledged. The European Medical Writers Association have published guidelines which aim to ensure professional medical writers carry out this role in an ethical and responsible manner. The use of properly acknowledged medical writers is accepted as legitimate by organisations such as the World Association of Medical Editors and the British Medical Journal. Moreover, professional medical writers' expertise in presenting scientific data may be of benefit in producing better quality papers.

=== Websites ===
Some websites, including blogs, are ghostwritten, because not all authors have the information technology skills or the time to dedicate to running a website. Nonetheless, the style, tone and content is modeled on that of the credited author. Many website ghostwriters are freelance but some are freelancers who work under contract, as with radio presenters and television presenters. Occasionally a "house pseudonym", or collective name is used by the author of the website.

Some celebrities, executives, or public figures set up blog websites—sometimes as a marketing, public relations, or lobbying tool. However, since these individuals are typically too busy to write their blog posts, they hire discreet ghostwriters to post to the blog under the celebrity or executive's name. As with nonfiction ghostwriting, the blog ghostwriter models their writing style, content and tone on that of the credited author. This goes for social media as well. Many public figures have ghostwriters at least partially handle their Facebook and Twitter accounts, among others.

=== Music ===
==== Classical music and film scores ====
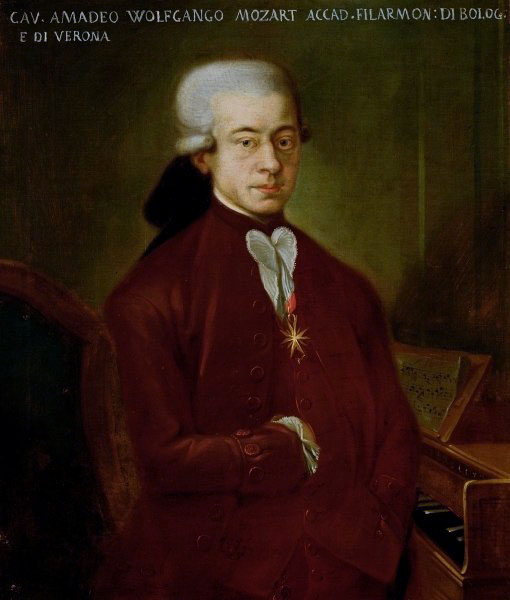
The Classical era composer Mozart was paid to ghostwrite music for wealthy patrons who wished to give the impression that they were gifted composers.

Wolfgang Amadeus Mozart is an example of a well-known composer who was paid to ghostwrite music for wealthy patrons. In the film industry, a music ghostwriter is a "person who composes music for another composer but is not credited on the cue sheet or in the final product in any way." The practice is considered one of the "dirty little secrets of the film and television music business" that is considered unethical, but has been common since the early stages of the film industry. In the early years of film, David Raksin worked as music ghostwriter and orchestrator for Charlie Chaplin; even though Chaplin was credited as the score writer, he was considered to be a "hummer" (pejorative film industry slang for a person who purports to be a film score composer but who in fact only gives a general idea of the melodies to a ghostwriter).

The practice is also common in television, as composers listed on cue sheets are entitled to music royalties every time an episode or theme score appears on television. A 1998 investigation by The Hollywood Reporter revealed that it was especially prevalent among animation companies such as Saban Entertainment, DiC, Ruby-Spears Productions and Hanna-Barbera, which often listed company executives as musicians for the purpose of royalties. In the late 1990s, several composers threatened a multimillion-dollar lawsuit against Saban Entertainment president Haim Saban, for allegedly taking ownership and credit for their musical compositions.

==== Popular music ====
Musical ghostwriting also occurs in popular music. When a record company wants to market an inexperienced young singer as a singer-songwriter, or help a veteran bandleader coping with writer's block (or a lack of motivation to finish the next album), an experienced songwriter may be discreetly brought in to help. In other cases, a ghostwriter writes lyrics and a melody in the style of the credited musician, with little or no input from the credited musician. A ghostwriter providing this type of service may be thanked, without reference to the service provided, in the album credits, or they may be a true 'ghost', with no acknowledgement in the album.

Legal disputes have arisen when musical ghostwriters have tried to claim royalties when an allegedly ghostwritten song becomes a money-making hit. In 1987, Darryl Neudorf was asked to work on a project for Nettwerk Productions involving newly signed artist Sarah McLachlan. This recording, the album Touch, resulted in garnering the interest of Arista Records. She signed a multi-album contract with them and two of the songs that Neudorf worked on with her became commercial hits in Canada. In 1991, Neudorf was invited to work with McLachlan again on her second album, Solace. In 1993, he filed a lawsuit against McLachlan and her label, alleging that he had made a significant and uncredited contribution to the songwriting on Touch, and alleging that he was not paid properly for work done on Solace. The judge in the suit eventually ruled in McLachlan's favour on the songs; stating that although Neudorf may have contributed to the songwriting, neither regarded each other as joint authors. The judge ruled in Neudorf's favour on the payment issue.

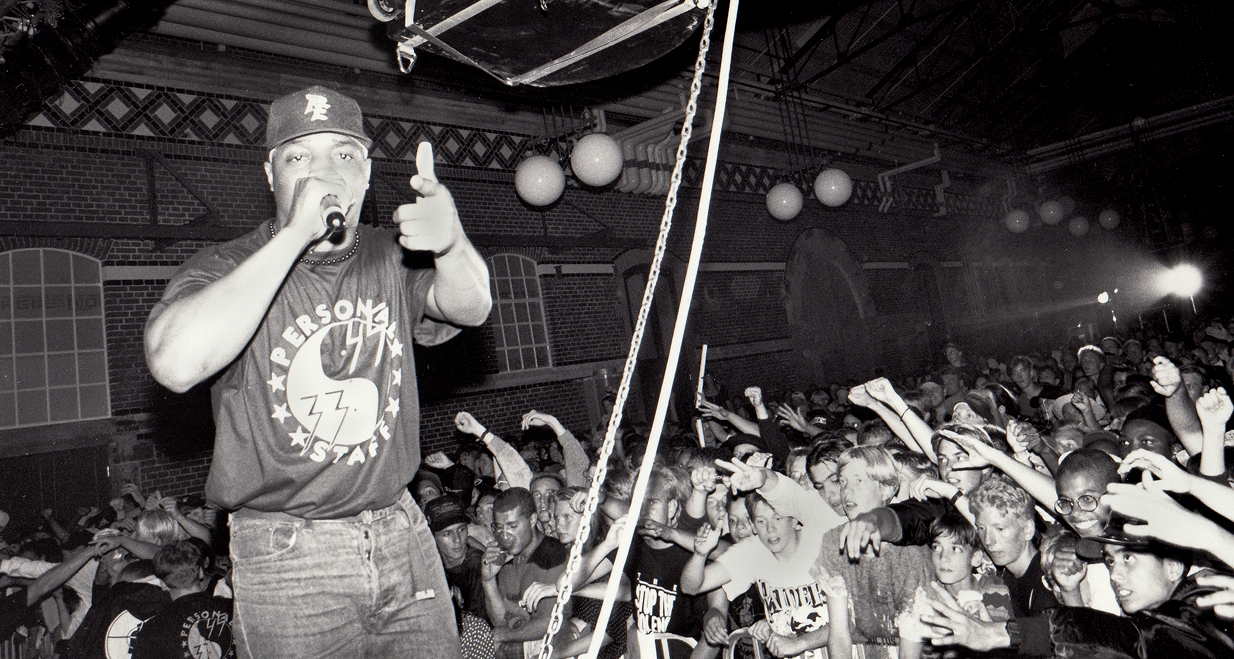
Chuck D of Public Enemy has offered a more positive view of ghostwriting in hip hop.

In hip hop music, the increasing use of ghostwriters by high-profile hip hop stars has led to controversy. Critics view the increasing use of hip hop ghostwriters as the "perversion of hip-hop by commerce." This is because of the limiting definition of "rapping" as "expressing yourself through your own words, not someone else's." Chuck D of Public Enemy thinks this point of view is mistaken because "not everyone is equipped to be a lyricist and not everyone is equipped to be a vocalist." He points out that creating a rap song may require multiple talents. Frank Ocean started his career as a ghostwriter for artists such as Justin Bieber, John Legend and Brandy.

Currently in hip-hop, the credit given to ghostwriters varies: "silent pens might sign confidentiality clauses, appear obliquely in the liner notes, or discuss their participation freely." In some cases, liner notes credit individuals for "vocal arrangement", which may be a euphemism for ghostwriting. In the early 2010s, hip-hop ghostwriting services like Rap Rebirth appeared online, which provide recording artists who wish to purchase ghostwritten rhymes a greater degree of anonymity.

=== Visual art ===
Ghost authorship also applies to the visual arts, most commonly paintings. The extent of the master artist's contribution varies widely, as little as composition adjustments and corrective brush strokes, or as much as entire works. A common practice is the use of art instruction class milieu in which the master artist makes significant contributions to the work of the student who then signs that work as their own. Services addressing complete works have historically been highly confidential. Less prevalent are advertised commercial services which may use the term "vanity artwork" as suggestive of "vanity publishing".

== As blacklisting countermeasure ==
In countries where freedom of speech is not upheld and authors that have somehow displeased the ruling regime are "blacklisted" (i.e. forbidden from having their works published), the blacklisted authors or composers may ghostwrite material for other authors or composers who are in the good graces of the regime. Examples include:

- Carl Foreman and Michael Wilson for Bridge on the River Kwai (credited to Pierre Boulle, who wrote the novel).
- Dalton Trumbo for Roman Holiday (credited to Ian McLellan Hunter).

== In culture ==
Movies and novels about ghostwriters include:

- Philip Roth's 1979 novel The Ghost Writer
- Chico Buarque's 2003 novel Budapeste about the tribulations of José Costa, its protagonist, between Rio de Janeiro and Budapest
- Jennie Erdal's 2004 memoirs Ghosting: a Memoir about working as ghostwriter of Naim Attallah for 20 years
- Claude Lelouch's 2006 film Roman de gare
- Robert Harris's 2007 novel The Ghost and its 2010 film adaptation The Ghost Writer by Roman Polanski
- Alan Cumming's 2007 horror film Ghost Writer, formerly Suffering Man's Charity
- Jason Reitman's 2011 comedy-drama film Young Adult
- The plot of the first season of the animated comedy-drama BoJack Horseman involves the title character BoJack dictating his memoirs to Diane Nguyen, a ghostwriter assigned by his publisher.
- David Mitchell's first novel Ghostwritten (1999) plays on the notion of characters ghostwriting their own lives.
- Haruki Murakami's 2009 novel 1Q84, in which one of the main plot lines revolves around a ghostwriter.
- Kyoto Animation's 2018 anime television series, Violet Evergarden, as well as the light novel of the same name, written by Kana Akatsuki.
- Andrew Unger's 2020 novel Once Removed

== See also ==
- Automatic writing
- Book-packaging
- Content farm
- Ghost singer
- Hack writer
- Pseudepigraph
- Script doctor
- Speechwriter
