= Kenneth C. Hutchin =

British physician and medical writer

Kenneth Charles Hutchin
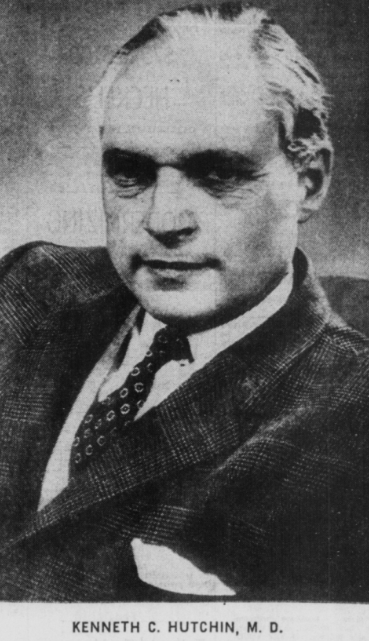
- Born: 1908
- Died: 1993 (aged 84–85)
- Occupations: Physician, medical writer

Kenneth Charles Hutchin (1908–1993) was a British physician and medical writer.

== Biography ==
Hutchin was a former Major in the Royal Army Medical Corps. He was Staff Surgeon at Herts Constabulary (1946–1975), General Practitioner for the National Health Service (1948–1975), Medical Officer for the Hertfordshire Society for the Blind (1949–1975) and Medical Correspondent for The Sunday Telegraph (1961–1965). He worked as a General Practitioner in Hatfield.

Hutchin's best known book was How Not to Kill Your Husband, published in 1952 and translated into six languages. Hutchin authored the book anonymously as "a family doctor". It was addressed to women to look after their husbands' health. Hutchin continued the "family doctor" series, authoring How Not to Kill Your Wife (1965) which covered birth control, menopause and pregnancy, How Not to Kill Your Children (1968) and How Not to Kill Yourself (1973). He also authored The Health of the Businessman which dedicated a chapter to resolving stress.

Hutchin's book How Not to Kill Your Husband was condensed into 12 newspaper articles entitled "How to Keep Your Husband Alive". In the early 1960s, Hutchin urged the use of bathroom scales, which were rarely used in Britain at the time.

== Diet ==
Hutchin's dietary advice for overweight people was a high-protein low-carbohydrate diet that is not high in fat. He recommended his readers to eat lean meat, fish and poultry, green vegetables and salads whilst avoiding all starch and sugar foods.

== Selected publications ==
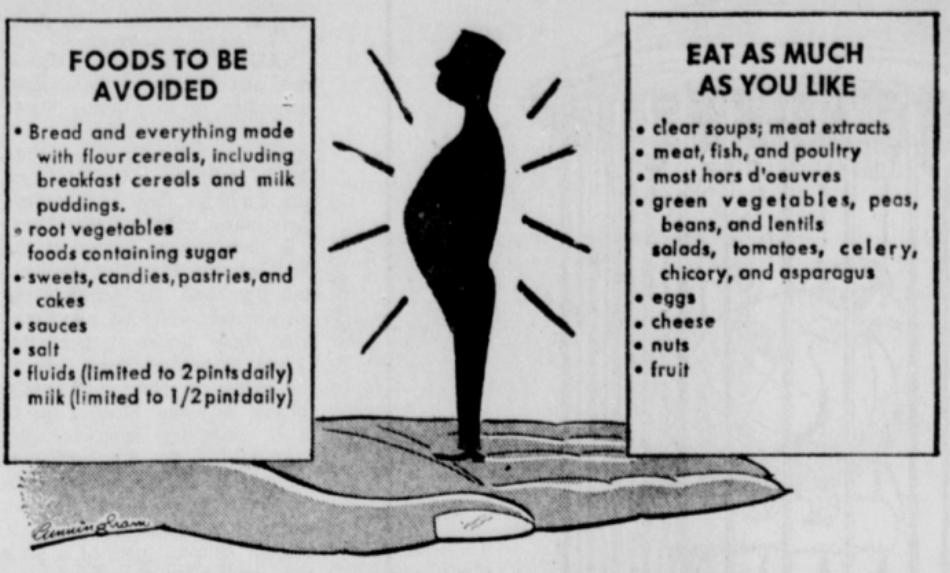
Hutchin's low-carbohydrate diet from 1962

- Your Diet and Your Health (1959)
- Allergy (1961)
- Coughs, Colds and Bronchitis (1961)
- How Not to Kill Your Husband (1962)
- The Change of Life (1963)
- Diabetes (as Kenneth Challice, 1964)
- Heart Disease and High Blood Pressure (1964)
- Slipped Discs (1964)
- Young Man's Guide to Health (1964)
- How Not to Kill your Wife (1965)
- How Your Body Uses Food (1965)
- The Health of the Businessman (1966)
- How Not to Kill Your Children (1968)
- Health and Sex (1969)
- How Not to Kill Yourself (1973)
