= Balaban (surname) =

Balaban (also Ballaban, Ballabon) is a surname, from a Turkic word meaning "robust", "burly", or a Ukrainian word meaning "hawk". Notable people with the surname include:

- Alexandru Balaban (born 1931), Romanian chemist
- Alper Balaban (1987–2010), Turkish footballer
- A. J. Balaban (1889–1962), co-founder of Balaban and Katz
- Barney Balaban (1887–1971), co-founder of Balaban and Katz
- Bob Balaban (born 1945), American actor and director (related to the founders of Balaban and Katz)
- Boško Balaban (born 1978), Croatian footballer
- Burt Balaban (1922–1965), American film producer and director
- Elmer Balaban (1909–2001), American theater owner and early cable television executive
- İbrahim Balaban (1921–2019), Turkish painter
- Jan Balabán (1961–2010), Czech writer
- John Balaban (poet) (born 1943), American poet and translator
- Judy Balaban (1932–2023), American actress and author
- Liane Balaban (born 1980), Canadian actress
- Meir Balaban (1874–1941), Polish Jewish historian
- Miriam Balaban, scientist
- Nathalie Q. Balaban, Israeli biophysicist
- Nina Balaban (born 1995), Macedonian sports shooter
- Ștefan Balaban (1890–1962), Romanian brigadier generał
- Darko Balaban (born 1989), Serbian basketball player

== Fictional ==
- Megadirettore Galattico (Galactic Megadirector) Duca Conte (Duke Count) Francesco Maria Balabam, one of the main characters in the novels and films about Ugo Fantozzi.

== See also ==
- Balabanov
