= Virginia Barbour =

Australian medical researcher and open access advocate

Ginny Barbour
- Born: Virginia M. Barbour
- Education: University of Cambridge (MB BChir, MA); University of Oxford (DPhil)
- Scientific career
- Workplaces: Queensland University of Technology
- Thesis: Regulation of the human α-globin genes by their chromatin context (1997)
- Website: staff.qut.edu.au/staff/ginny.barbour

Virginia M. Barbour is a professor at Queensland University of Technology in Brisbane, Australia, Editor-in-Chief of Medical Journal of Australia, and co-chair of DORA. She has served as the director of the Australasian Open Access Strategy Group. Barbour is best known for being one of the three founding editors of PLOS Medicine, and her various roles in championing the open access movement.

== Education ==
Barbour pursued a Bachelor of Medicine, Bachelor of Surgery (MB BChir) degree and Master of Arts (MA) degree at the University of Cambridge. This was followed by a Doctor of Philosophy degree in molecular medicine at the University of Oxford where her research investigated the control of alpha globin genes and was awarded in 1997.

== Career and research ==
Following her education and training, Barbour served as an executive editor at The Lancet between 1994 and 2004. Barbour was one of the three founding editors of PLOS Medicine (2004–2013), and later served as the PLOS Medicine Editorial Director (2012–2014), and the PLOS Medicine and Biology Editorial Director (2014–2015). Barbour has also served as a chair of the Committee on Publication Ethics (COPE) for two terms (2012–2015; 2015–2017). She served as the director of the Australasian open access strategy group from 2015, before her tenure as Editor-in-Chief of the Medical Journal of Australia from 2023. Barbour is a part-time professor between the Office of Research Ethics & Integrity and the Division of Technology, Information and Learning Services, at Queensland University of Technology in Brisbane, Australia, and co-chair of DORA.

Barbour has published over 100 peer reviewed publications, generating over 14,000 citations and has an h-index of 20. She has played a role in developing several reporting guidelines and open-access initiatives, including Consolidated Standards of Reporting Trials (CONSORT), Preferred Reporting Items for Systematic Reviews and Meta-Analyses (PRISMA), Healthcare Information For All (HIFA) and Evidence AID.

=== Selected publications ===
- Nephrotic syndrome associated with sulphasalazine
- UK Biobank: a project in search of a protocol?
- CONSORT 2010 statement: updated guidelines for reporting parallel group randomised trials
- CONSORT 2010 explanation and elaboration: updated guidelines for reporting parallel group randomised trials. 2012. International Journal of Surgery.
- Better reporting of interventions: template for intervention description and replication (TIDieR) checklist and guide
- Potential predatory and legitimate biomedical journals: can you tell the difference? A cross-sectional comparison
