= Henry Banyer =

English physician

Henry Banyer (fl. 1739), was a medical writer.

Banyer studied at St. Thomas's Hospital, and practised as a physician at Wisbeach. He was admitted extraordinary licentiate of the College of Surgeons on 30 July 1736. His works are Methodical Introduction to the Art of Surgery, 1717, and Pharmacopœia Pauperum, or the Hospital Dispensary, containing the chief Medicines now used in the Hospitals of London, 1721, 4th ed. 1739.
