= European Association of Science Editors =

- Abbreviation: EASE
- Formation: 1982; 44 years ago
- Type: NGO
- Purpose: To improve the global standard and quality of science editing, by promoting the value of science editors and supporting professional development, research, and collaboration
- Headquarters: United Kingdom
- Region served: mostly Europe
- Main organ: Council and Committees
- Parent organization: European Life Science Editors' Association (ELSE) and European Association of Earth Science Editors (Editerra)
- Website: www.ease.org.uk

The European Association of Science Editors (EASE /ˈiːz/) is a non-profit membership organisation for people interested in science communication and editing. Founded in 1982, in France, EASE has an international membership.

== Members ==
EASE has nearly 500 members (July 2020) who live in about 50 countries, not only in Europe but also in other parts of the world.

Members work in many disciplines and occupations: commissioning editors, academics, science translators, publishers, web and multi-media staff, indexers, statistical editors, science and technical writers, authors' editors, journalists, corporate communicators, proofreaders, production personnel, managing editors, etc. Just less than 10% of members claim to be chief editors of science journals.

== Major conferences ==
EASE holds a conference every 3 or 2 years.

Previous conferences:

2023 Istanbul, Turkey
2021 Valencia, Spain
2020 First virtual conference
2018 Bucharest, Romania
2016 Strasbourg, France
2014 Split, Croatia
2012 Tallinn, Estonia
2009 Pisa, Italy
2006 Kraków, Poland
2003 Bath, United Kingdom
2003 Halifax, Canada (joint meeting with AESE)
2000 Tours, France
1998 Washington, D.C., United States (joint meeting with CBE and AESE)
1997 Helsinki, Finland
1994 Budapest, Hungary
1991 Oxford, United Kingdom
1989 Ottawa, Canada (joint meeting with CBE and AESE)
1988 Basel, Switzerland
1985 Holmenkollen, Norway
1982 Pau, France

== History ==
EASE was formed in May 1982 in Pau, France, from the European Life Science Editors' Association (ELSE) and the European Association of Earth Science Editors (Editerra). The history of these organizations goes further back:

The European Association of Editors of Biological Periodicals (EAEBP) was formed in April 1967 in Amsterdam by Miriam Balaban and others. EAEBP was renamed European Life Science Editors (ELSE) at its first General Assembly, held at the Royal Society in London in 1970.

The European Association of Earth Science Editors (Editerra) was formed at a meeting of the Constituent Assembly of the European Association of Earth Science Editors, held in Paris from December 2–4, 1968, under the sponsorship of Unesco and the International Union of Geological Sciences.

ELSE joined with Editerra to form the European Association of Science Editors (EASE) in 1982.

Concerns of the organization included the development of international standards for science journals, guidelines for authors whose first language was not English, republishing of articles in multiple languages, and the improvement of science communication generally.

== Gender Policy Committee ==
At its Congress in Tallinn in 2012, upon the initiative of Shirin Heidari, EASE Council established the EASE Gender Policy Committee, the first international initiative to address the gender bias in the reporting of scholarly articles in scientific journals. The EASE Gender Policy Committee works to advance gender- and sex-sensitive reporting and communication in science.

Following a consultative process, the EASE Gender Policy Committee developed and published the Sex and Gender Equity in Research (SAGER) Guidelines, as the first reporting guidelines to encourage systematic reporting of sex and gender dimensions in scholarly publication. The SAGER guidelines are listed in EQUATOR. They have also been translated into Chinese, Korean, Portuguese, Spanish, Turkish, and Vietnamese, and adopted by a number of journals.

== Sustainable Development Goals ==
In 2021, EASE became a signatory of the SDG Publishers Compact, and has taken steps to support the achievement of the Sustainable Development Goals (SDGs) in the publishing industry.

These include publication of a 2021 Environmental Manifesto outlining a variety of environmentally responsible actions for publishers and others. Digital publication, the role of editors, and improvements in journal distribution are particularly relevant actions for publishers, but the adoption of an environment policy and improvements in office, employee, food, and building management are broadly applicable to other types of organizations.

== Affiliations ==
EASE is affiliated to the International Union of Biological Sciences (IUBS), and the International Union of Geological Sciences (IUGS), has category A liaison status with the International Organization for Standardization (Technical Committee 46/subcommittee 9) (ISO) and is represented on committees of the British Standards Institution. Through its affiliation to IUBS and IUGS the Association is also affiliated to the International Council of Scientific Unions (ICSU) and is thereby in formal associate relations with UNESCO.

EASE cooperates actively with Mediterranean Editors and Translators (MET), the Council of Science Editors (CSE), and the Association of Earth Science Editors (AESE). Its other links include the African Association of Science Editors, the European Medical Writers Association (EMWA), the Finnish Association of Science Editors and Journalists (FASEJ), the Society of English-Native-Speaking Editors (Netherlands) (SENSE), AuthorAID, and, in the UK, the Association for Learned and Professional Society Publishers (ALPSP) and the Chartered Institute of Editing and Proofreading (CIEP).

== See also ==
- American Association for the Advancement of Science (AAAS)
- American Medical Writers Association (AMWA)
- Board of Editors in the Life Sciences (BELS)
- Council of Science Editors (CSE)
- Editors' Association of Canada (EAC)
- European Medical Writers Association (EMWA)
- European Science Editing (journal)
- European Science Foundation
- Institute of Scientific and Technical Communicators
- Mediterranean Editors and Translators (MET)
- Office of Research Integrity
- Pharmaceutical publication planning
- Society for Technical Communication (STC)
- Uniform Requirements for Manuscripts Submitted to Biomedical Journals
