= Scientists Without Borders =

Scientists Without Borders is an initiative that aims to mobilize and coordinate science-based, capacity-building efforts in the developing world. Its founders and partners believe that the scientific community has tremendous potential for promoting global health, agricultural progress, environmental well-being, energy needs, and other crucial advances, yet it lacks a way to mobilize its members for these benefits. Motivation to create such a body has intensified with the growing realization that integrated rather than narrow approaches are crucial for addressing key challenges such as extreme poverty and the glaring health problems that accompany it. Despite much excitement around this project in 2008, no sources or database links show any current activity (As of 2025).

== Overview ==
Guided by the UN Millennium Development Goals and co-conceived by the New York Academy of Sciences (NYAS) and the UN Millennium Development Project, Scientists Without Borders first goal is to build a Web portal. The portal's cornerstone will be a database that aims to:

1. Foster cross communication among the many capacity-building efforts that take place in close physical proximity to one another, but without meaningful contact—and foster innovative activities among them.
2. Register needs and available resources, thus allowing scientists and organizations to connect and direct their energies for maximum impact.
3. Link scientists who wish to work on global health, environmental challenges, and other vital issues with institutions and projects that would welcome their expertise.
4. Provide a system by which organizations can build on one another's progress.
5. Offer funding agencies the opportunity to quickly assess local needs and resources as well as qualifications of potential grantees.

The Web site launched May 12, 2008 and is accepting database submissions.

Scientists Without Borders is a global partnership, led by the New York Academy of Sciences. Organizational partners include the Forum for Agricultural Research in Africa, the Academy of Sciences for the Developing World (Third World Academy of Sciences), Health Sciences Online, The Earth Institute, the Noguchi Memorial Institute for Medical Research, the University of Ghana, Seeding Labs, the International AIDS Vaccine Initiative, the Pasteur Institute, Duke University Health System, Science and Development Network, Drugs for Neglected Diseases Initiative, the Sabin Vaccine Institute, Universities Allied for Essential Medicines, the African Centre for Technology Studies, the Science Initiative Group, the Information Training and Outreach Centre for Africa, International Foundation for Science, the Nigeria Higher Education Foundation, the American Society for Cell Biology, the Partnership for Quality Medical Donations, Sustainable Sciences Institute, BioMed Central, African Green Revolution Conference, World Academy of Young Scientists, PharmExperts.com, Millennium Development Goals Monitor, United Nations Development Programme, the INDEPTH Network, American Physiological Society, American Society of Agronomy, Association of Nigerian Physicians in the Americas, Crop Science Society of America, Soil Science Society of America and Toxipedia.

== See also ==
- AuthorAID
- Without Borders
