= European Medical Writers Association =

The European Medical Writers Association (EMWA) was established in 1992 in Brussels, Belgium, as a professional organisation for European medical writers, whether working freelance or in-house at pharmaceutical companies or medical communications companies. Between 1992 and 1998, EMWA was the European chapter of the American Medical Writers Association.

EMWA now has over 800 members from 27 countries, and includes academics and professionals working in-house or freelance for pharmaceutical and medical communications companies, research institutes and in the field of scientific journalism. EMWA has an extensive professional development programme, and runs workshops and other educational and social events at bi-annual conferences, one in Spring and the other in Autumn, both in European locations. EMWA also publishes a journal, The Write Stuff, four times a year. In 2012, the journal changed its name to Medical Writing and began being published by Maney Publishing. Since the beginning of 2016, the journal is now once again self-published and printed by Hastings; feature articles are now open access.

The Association pays special attention to ethical issues, to avoid unjustified interpretation of results of medical research, e.g. "The writer should also ensure that conclusions are fully supported by the data and that publications do not contain unjustified claims. Secondary publications and post-hoc analyses must be clearly identified as such. Medical writers should also draw atten tion to any limitations of the study in the discussion section. [...] If a CER writer is aware of good quality evidence that contradicts a point being made in a review, or in the discussion section of a primary publication, the writer should attempt to ensure that this research is cited."

== See also ==
- American Medical Writers Association (AMWA)
- Council of Science Editors (CSE)
- Editors' Association of Canada (EAC)
- European Association of Science Editors (EASE)
- Pharmaceutical publication planning
- Society for Technical Communication (STC)
- Uniform Requirements for Manuscripts Submitted to Biomedical Journals
