= Rap Rebirth =

Online hip-hop ghostwriting service

- Website type: Lyric writing service
- Available in: English
- Owner: Privately owned
- Website: http://www.rap-rebirth.com
- Commercial: Yes
- Registration: None
- Launched: 2008
- Current status: Active

Rap Rebirth is an online hip-hop ghostwriting service. It was founded in 2008 and is based in Los Angeles, California. The site provides customized lyrics for rappers across the globe. No claims are made on royalties, and the writers receive no formal credit. The site maintains a strict confidentiality policy to protect its clients. Rap Rebirth has been the subject of both praise and controversy within the hip-hop community. It claims to be the world's first online lyric writing service.

== History ==
Rap Rebirth was founded in 2008 by Jesse Kramer while studying film and business at the University of Southern California. Initially its clients were a handful of up and coming regional rappers. In the months after its launch the site grew its client base substantially through word of mouth and online marketing. The company discloses little about its current client roster, though there is speculation clients include mainstream hip-hop acts.

== Heart Raps and Birthday Raps ==
In July 2011, Rap Rebirth launched a new site called Heart Raps. The site sells custom rap lyrics to be given as romantic gifts and is targeted toward a wider consumer market. The site attracts a wide range of clients including people in their 40s, 50s, and 60s. The site is said to be inspired by the ghostwritten love letters of Cyrano de Bergerac. Birthday Raps, a site specifically for customized birthday verses, followed in April, 2012.

== Rap Rebirth Corporate ==
In August 2011 a service geared toward enterprise clients called Rap Rebirth Corporate was launched. The site offers custom hip-hop lyrics for advertising, packaging, branding, and business presentations.
