= Medical Journal of Australia =

- Discipline: Medicine
- Language: English
- Edited by: Virginia Barbour

Publication details
- Former names: Australian Medical Journal, Intercolonial Quarterly Journal of Medicine and Surgery, Intercolonial Medical Journal of Australasia
- History: 1856–present
- Publisher: Wiley on behalf of the Australasian Medical Publishing Company (Australia)
- Frequency: 22/year
- Open access: Hybrid
- Impact factor: 11.4 (2022)

Standard abbreviations
- ISO 4: Med. J. Aust.

Indexing
- CODEN: MJAUAJ
- ISSN: 0025-729X (print); 1326-5377 (web)
- OCLC no.: 925316442

Links
- Journal homepage; Journal page at publisher's website; Online access; Online archive

The Medical Journal of Australia (MJA) is a peer-reviewed medical journal published 22 times a year. It is the official journal of the Australian Medical Association, published by Wiley on behalf of the Australasian Medical Publishing Company.

The journal publishes editorials, original research, guideline summaries, narrative reviews, perspectives, medical education, reflections, and letters. The full text of every issue since January 2002 is available online.

== History ==
=== Early origins ===
The journal was established in 1856, when communication between Australian states and other English-speaking nations entailed long delays. The journal was both a platform for Australian medical research, as well as educational reviews summarising research done overseas. It has since been renamed several times:

- Australian Medical Journal (1856–1895)
- Intercolonial Quarterly Journal of Medicine and Surgery (1895–1896)
- Intercolonial Medical Journal of Australasia (1896–1909)
- Australian Medical Journal (1910–1914)
- Medical Journal of Australia (1914–present, with volume numbering restarting at 1)

=== MJA today ===
The current editor of the MJA - appointed in 2023 - is Virginia Barbour.

=== Elsevier ===
In 2015, then editor-in-chief Stephen Leeder was suddenly removed after criticising the decision to outsource production of the journal to the global publishing giant Elsevier. Leeder's concerns revolved around an incident in 2009 when Elsevier accepted payments from pharmaceutical company Merck & Co. to publish journals such as the Australasian Journal of Bone & Joint Medicine, which had the appearance of peer-reviewed academic works but were in fact promoting Merck. Following the decision to sack Leeder, all but one of the journal's editorial advisory committee resigned and wrote to Australian Medical Association president Brian Owler asking him to review the decision.

Nicholas Talley succeeded Stephen Leeder as editor-in-chief in September 2015 and the editorial advisory group was subsequently reconstituted.

=== Wiley ===
From January 2019, the journal is published by Wiley. Print distribution remains with the Australasian Medical Publishing Company and editorial direction and decisions remain with the journal.

=== Publishing and access ===
Having previously published under a subscription model, the journal changed in January 2012 to make all of its research articles free to read online. The journal converted to a hybrid model in January 2019: Authors can either pay an article processing fee to publish fully open access (gold open access) or archive the submitted version of their article in online repositories (green open access). In order to demonstrate commitment to Australian Indigenous health and health awareness, the journal makes all Indigenous health articles free to access without charging authors.

== MJA InSight+ ==
MJA InSight+ is a newsletter for medical professionals produced by the MJA. Articles are primarily written by in-house journalists and doctors. It has the largest medical-newsletter subscription membership in Australia.

MJA InSight is published by the Australasian Medical Publishing Company, the publishers of the MJA. The newsletter informs clinicians of key developments and research in medicine and health.

== Abstracting and indexing ==
The journal is abstracted and indexed in:

- CAB Abstracts
- CINAHL
- Current Contents/Clinical Medicine
- Current Contents/Life Sciences
- Embase
- Index Medicus/MEDLINE/PubMed
- Science Citation Index
- Scopus

According to the Journal Citation Reports, the journal had a 2022 impact factor of 11.4, ranking it 17th out of 167 in the category "General and Internal Medicine".

== See also ==
- List of medical journals
