= Editors' Association of Canada =

Canadian organization

Editors’ Association of Canada (Editors Canada)
- Founded: May 20, 1979
- Headquarters: Toronto
- Region served: Canada
- Members: about 1500
- Official languages: English, French
- Affiliations: Book and Periodical Council, Cultural Human Resources Council
- Revenue: $546,606 (2013)
- Expenses: $558,028 (2013)
- Employees: 6
- Website: editors.ca reviseurs.ca (in French)
- Formerly called: Freelance Editors’ Association of Canada

The Editors' Association of Canada (Editors Canada), or Association canadienne des réviseurs (Réviseurs Canada) in French, is a professional organization for editors. The association has about 1,500 members.

Editors Canada sponsors professional development seminars, promotes and maintains high standards of editing and publishing in Canada, creates guidelines to help editors secure fair pay and good working conditions, helps both in-house and freelance editors to network, and cooperates with other publishing associations in areas of common concern. The association is incorporated federally as a not-for-profit organization and is governed at the national level by an executive council.

== History ==
In May 1979, the Freelance Editors' Association of Canada (FEAC) was officially launched. There were approximately 50 people involved with Maggie MacDonald serving as the association's first president.

By 1981, Ottawa was hosting a group; three years later, Montreal formed a committee; and in 1985, British Columbia did the same. Until 1990, FEAC operated as a Toronto-based organization. During 1990 and 1991, a new national structure with four separate regional branches was established. The branches were Quebec-Atlantic Canada, National Capital Region, Toronto, and Western Canada (essentially British Columbia). In 1982, FEAC adopted a French name, Association canadienne des pigistes de l'edition and committed to being a bilingual association.

During the first 15 years of its existence, FEAC addressed primarily issues unique to freelance editors. Over the years, that emphasis gradually changed. In 1994, the association's name was changed to the Editors' Association of Canada/Association canadienne des rédacteurs-réviseurs and in-house editors were invited to join.

In 1996, the Editors' Association of Alberta came under the umbrella of EAC, becoming the Prairie Provinces Branch. In 2005, a group of editors in Saskatchewan formed a sixth branch, Saskatoon (later renamed "Saskatchewan"). In 2000, the association’s French name was changed to Association canadienne des réviseurs. In 2006, EAC launched its professional certification program for proofreading, copy editing, structural editing, and stylistic editing, along with the CPE (Certified Professional Editor) designation. In 2015, the association launched its French editing proficiency program, Programme d'agrément en révision linguistique – Réviseurs Canada (PARL). In 2015, the association changed the short form of its name from "EAC" to "Editors Canada" (in French, "ACR" changed to "Réviseurs Canada").

== Major programs ==
Tom Fairley Award for Editorial Excellence: Established in 1983 and presented annually, The Tom Fairley Award for Editorial Excellence recognizes the editor's often invisible contribution to written communication.

Claudette Upton Scholarship: The Claudette Upton Scholarship is an annual award of $1,000 that recognizes a student editor from among Editors Canada's membership. It was awarded for the first time in 2010.

Lee d'Anjou Volunteer of the Year Award and President's Award for Volunteer Service: In 2010, the association launched the Lee d'Anjou Volunteer of the Year Award and the President's Award for Volunteer Service which recognize service by members to the organization at the local or national level.

Editors' Association of Canada (Editors Canada) Certification: Editors Canada's certification program sets objective standards for recognizing high levels of knowledge and skill in editing. Successful candidates can become Certified Professional Editors or earn certification in proofreading, copy editing, structural editing, and stylistic editing.

Programme d'agrément en révision linguistique – Réviseurs Canada (PARL): In 2015, the association launched its French editing proficiency program, Programme d'agrément en révision linguistique – Réviseurs Canada (PARL). PARL is composed of two exams: the examen d'agrément en révision linguistique générale which focuses on French editing; and the examen en révision comparative which tests the concordance in text editing that has been translated from English to French. Successful candidates can earn designations such as réviseur agréé and professionnel agréé en révision générale et comparative.

Annual Conference: The association hosts a spring conference in a different Canadian city each year. In 2015, the association hosted the first international conference of editors with attendees from Canada, Africa, Australia, India, Ireland, New Zealand, the UK, and the US.

== Selected publications ==
- Professional Editorial Standards, adopted by the association's membership in 1991, revised in 1999 and again in 2009
- Principes directeurs en révision professionnelle, professional standards for editing in French, first produced in 2006
- Editing Canadian English, 3rd edition, a reference guide for writers, editors, and others who work with Canadian English, published in 2015
- Editorial Niches, explores a range of editorial genres, 2015
- Meeting Professional Editorial Standards, covers the core editorial skills needed to work as an editor
- Certification Study Guides, an overview of Editors Canada Certification, advice on how to prepare for the tests, a practice test, an answer key, and marking sheets
- Active Voice / Voix active, the Editors' Association of Canada's national newsletter, since 1981, now published once a year
- So You Want to Be an Editor, an inside look at the editing profession in Canada and an overview of the path to launching an editing career, first published in 1991, revised and updated in 2011 and 2015

== See also ==
- American Medical Writers Association
- Council of Science Editors
- European Association of Science Editors
- European Medical Writers Association
- Society for Technical Communication
