= Jagdish Khubchandani =

Indian-American public health researcher

- Khubchandani at a U.S. Department of Health and Human Services meeting
- Born: Rawatbhata, Rajasthan, India

Academic background
- Education: Devi Ahilya Vishwavidyalaya (MBBS); Western Kentucky University (MPH); University of Toledo (PhD)

Academic work
- Discipline: Public health
- Sub-discipline: Social epidemiology, injury prevention
- Institutions: Ball State University; New Mexico State University

Jagdish Khubchandani is an Indian-American public health researcher. He is a professor in the Department of Public Health Sciences at New Mexico State University (NMSU). His research covers social epidemiology, mental health, and injury and violence prevention, including firearm violence.

== Early life and education ==
Khubchandani was born in Rawatbhata and attended school in Kota. He received an MBBS from Devi Ahilya Vishwavidyalaya in Indore. In the United States, he earned a Master of Public Health from Western Kentucky University and, in 2010, a PhD in health education and epidemiology from the University of Toledo.

== Career ==
Khubchandani joined the faculty of Ball State University in 2010. In August 2020, he became a professor of public health sciences at New Mexico State University.

In 2025, he was elected secretary of the World Association of Medical Editors, having previously served as one of its directors; his term runs until 2027.

== Research ==
Khubchandani has studied firearm violence in the United States, including in schools. A 2019 review he co-authored found little evidence that common school security measures, such as arming school staff, reduce gun violence. In 2020, he examined firearm purchases in the United States during the COVID-19 pandemic. His other research has addressed the health effects of job insecurity and sleep deprivation among American workers, particularly in occupations such as health care and policing. In 2024, he reported an association between depression and higher mortality among women with breast cancer.

== Awards ==
- 2017 – Dorothy Nyswander Open Society Award, Society for Public Health Education
- 2020 – Karen Denard Goldman Mentor Award, Society for Public Health Education
- 2024 – Lyndon Haviland Public Health Mentoring Award, American Public Health Association
