= Committee on Publication Ethics =

Nonprofit organization

- Abbreviation: COPE
- Formation: 1997; 29 years ago
- Registration no.: 1123023
- Official language: English
- Website: www.publicationethics.org

The Committee on Publication Ethics (COPE) is a nonprofit organization whose stated mission is to define best practice in the ethics of scholarly publishing and to assist editors and publishers to achieve this.

== Mission ==
COPE educates and support editors, publishers and those involved in publication ethics with the aim of moving the culture of publishing towards one where ethical practices become the norm, part of the publishing culture. COPE's approach is firmly in the direction of influencing through education, resources and support of COPE members. It also provides a forum for its members to discuss individual cases.

COPE publishes a monthly newsletter and organises annual seminars. COPE has created an audit tool for members to measure compliance with its 'Core Practices' and guidance in the form of flowcharts, discussion documents, guidelines and eLearning modules.

== History ==
COPE was established in 1997 by a small group of medical journal editors in the United Kingdom. As of 2022, COPE has over 13,000 members worldwide, from all academic fields. Paid membership is open to editors of academic journals and others interested in publication ethics, and varies per year depending on the membership type.

COPE's first guidelines were developed after discussion at the COPE meeting in April 1999 and were published as Guidelines on Good Publication Practice in the Annual Report in 1999. On their basis, the first edition of Code of Conduct for Editors was published on the first COPE website in November 2004, with an Editorial in the BMJ.[5] The Code was replaced in 2017 with a simplified description of expectations as COPE's Core Practices, with links to COPE's detailed guidance.

Previous COPE Chairs include: Michael Farthing, Fiona Godlee, Harvey Markovitch, Elizabeth Wager, Virginia Barbour, Chris Graf and Geraldine Pearson (co-Chairs), Deborah Poff. Dan Kulp was the chair from 2000 to 2024. COPE is currently chaired by Nancy Chescheir.

== Structure ==
COPE is governed by the Trustee Board, who are ultimately responsible for the financial, legal and business operations of COPE as a charitable business and gives authority to Council and the Executive Officer and team to manage the day to day affairs of the organization.

== Links with other organizations ==
COPE also has links with the Council of Science Editors, the European Association of Science Editors, the International Society of Managing and Technical Editors, the World Association of Medical Editors, Open Access Scholarly Publishers Association, Directory of Open Access Journals, STM, and the Association of Learned and Professional Society Publishers, Sage Publishing.

== See also ==
- EASE Guidelines for Authors and Translators of Scientific Articles
- United States Office of Research Integrity
