= Miriam Balaban =

American editor and scientist

- Born: Philadelphia, Pennsylvania, U.S.
- Education: University of Pennsylvania
- Awards: Stella della solidarietà italiana
- Scientific career
- Fields: Science communication, Desalination

External videos
- "Water Sharing and Cooperation in Israel, Palestine and Jordan", Miriam Balaban, Sharing Knowledge Foundation
- "To face a changing world", Miriam Balaban, Sharing Knowledge Foundation

Miriam Balaban (born in Philadelphia) is a publisher, editor and scientist, recognized for her work in science communication and desalination. She has founded international organizations (European Association of Science Editors; International Federation of Science Editors), conferences (International Conference of Scientific Editors) and journals (Desalination, editor 1966–2009; Desalination and Water Treatment, editor 2009-; Symbiosis 1985-) and has edited numerous journals, conference proceedings and books. She also publishes the Desalination Directory, an international online database.

Balaban was a research associate for science communication at Boston University from 1975 to 2008. She became secretary general of the organizing committee of the International Federation of Scientific Editors' Associations (IFSEA) in 1978, and the founder and first president of its successor organization, the International Federation of Science Editors (IFSE) in 1990. She was Professor and founding Dean of the School for Science Communication at the Mario Negri Sud Institute for Biomedical and Pharmacological Research in Italy from 1988 to 1992. She has been the secretary general of the European Desalination Society (EDS) since 1993. Among other awards, Balaban received the Order of the Star of Italian Solidarity from the President of Italy in 2012.

== Early life ==
Miriam Balaban was born in Philadelphia, Pennsylvania, and graduated from the Philadelphia High School for Girls in 1945. She attended the University of Pennsylvania where she graduated with a B.Sc. degree in chemistry in 1949.

== Science communication ==
Soon after graduating, Balaban moved to Jerusalem where she found work editing the quarterly scientific bulletin of the Government Research Council. The first volume of the Bulletin of the Research Council of Israel was published by Balaban in both English and Hebrew. Under her direction, publication of the bulletin was greatly expanded, eventually splitting into five separate publications focusing on various areas of science, published through the Weizmann Science Press. In 1958, Balaban established the Israel Program for Scientific Translation, contracting with the United States National Science Foundation to fund the translation of foreign language publications.

In the United States, the Council of Biology Editors (CBE), later the Council of Science Editors (CSE), was formed in 1957 following discussions at the Conference of Biological Editors in New Orleans. CBE had the support of the National Science Foundation and the American Institute of Biological Sciences. In 1960, the organization published its first Style Manual for Biological Journals. At the 1964 CBE conference in Ann Arbor, Michigan, a special meeting was held for both American and European editors.

This inspired the formation of similar organizations in Europe. Miriam Balaban helped to start the European Association of Editors of Biological Periodicals (EAEBP). EAEBP was formed in April 1967 in Amsterdam, and renamed European Life Science Editors (ELSE) at its first General Assembly, held at the Royal Society in London in 1970. In 1982, ELSE joined with the European Association of Earth Science Editors (Editerra) to form the European Association of Science Editors (EASE). Balaban served multiple terms as treasurer of the organization. Concerns of the organization included the development of international standards for science journals, guidelines for authors whose first language was not English, republishing of articles in multiple languages, and the improvement of science communication generally.

From 1975 to 2008, Balaban was a research associate at the Center for Philosophy and History of Science at Boston University, focusing on science communication.

In 1977-1978 Balaban helped to found the International Federation of Scientific Editors' Associations (IFSEA). The idea for such an organization was put forward at the First International Conference of Scientific Editors, April 24–29, 1977, which Balaban organized. The idea was further discussed at a UNESCO-supported consultation meeting, chaired by Balaban, which was held June 5–6, 1978 in Paris, France. The formation of IFSEA was agreed upon and Balaban was named to the organizing committee as secretary-general.

Balaban organized 12 international conferences for scientific editors, beginning in 1977 with the first International Conference of Scientific Editors in Jerusalem. In 1990, IFSEA opened its membership to individuals as well as associations, and became IFSE, the International Federation of Science Editors (variously the International Federation of Scientific Editors), with Balaban as its founder and first president.

Balaban is president, publisher and editor of the scientific publishing house International Science Services. Based in Rehovot, Israel and L'Aquila, Italy. ISS publishes in a variety of scientific disciplines. Balaban has supported the development of journals both within and outside her own field. In 1985, she worked with lichenologist Margalith Galun to create the journal Symbiosis. The first 48 issues were published by Balaban International Science Services. From October 2009 onwards, the journal has been published by Springer.

She established the School for Science Communication at the Mario Negri Sud Institute for Biomedical and Pharmacological Research in Italy where she served as Professor and Dean from 1988 to 1992.

== Desalination ==
The focus of Balaban's research career has been desalination. In 1966, Balaban founded Desalination, the first international journal for desalting and purification of water, serving as its editor-in-chief from 1996 to 2009. She was succeeded as editor by Nidal Hilal. In 2009 Balaban established and became editor-in-chief of the monthly Desalination and Water Treatment Journal, to accommodate the expanding field. She has reviewed and edited more than 20,000 papers and several books from over 100 countries. She is the editor and publisher of the Desalination Directory. The international online database connects over 30,000 individuals and 5,000 academic and government institutions and companies involved in desalination and water conservation.

Balaban has been a member of the International Desalination Association since 1975 and has served as a board member and officer. She is a member of the Scientific Program Committee for the International Desalination Workshop.

Since 1993, Balaban has been the secretary general of the European Desalination Society (EDS), located at the Università Campus Bio-Medico, Rome, Italy. Balaban organizes international courses, conferences and workshops in desalination, traveling and speaking internationally. She has been referred to as "the soul of the European Desalination Society".

In her position with the EDS, she served on the committee to Review the Desalination and Water Purification Technology Roadmap, a document prepared by Sandia National Laboratories and the U.S. Department of Interior in 2003. The committee's review was published by the National Research Council and the National Academy of Sciences in 2004. It recommended that a more critical focus be taken, examining the steps needed to reach desired long-term objectives and the environmental, economic, and social costs.

Balaban is involved with the desalination program at the Center for Clean Water and Energy in the Department of Mechanical Engineering at Massachusetts Institute of Technology (MIT). She is on the Scientific Advisory Council of the Sharing Knowledge Foundation.

== Awards ==
- 2015, named #7 of Top 25 Water Industry Leaders by Water & Wastewater International
- 2014, Sidney Loeb Award, European Desalination Society
- 2012, Order of the Star of Italian Solidarity (Stella della solidarietà italiana) from the President of Italy
- 2009, Lifetime Achievement award, International Desalination Association, Dubai
- Honorary member of the European Membrane Society (EMS)
