= Evidence Aid =

International platform

- Formation: 2004
- Founded: 2004
- Founded at: Oxford, England
- Type: International organization
- Headquarters: Oxford, United Kingdom
- Region served: Worldwide
- Director: Mike Clarke
- Website: http://www.evidenceaid.org/

Evidence Aid is an international platform that was formed out of the need to deliver time sensitive access to systematic reviews for use in the event of disasters and other humanitarian emergencies. The method of using systematic reviews (a collection of available evidence on any given topic) is to provide evidence for use by policy makers, clinicians, regulators, and even the general public who benefit when these materials are easy to understand and are accessible. The vision of Evidence Aid is to create and satisfy an increasing demand for evidence to improve the impact of humanitarian aid by stimulating the use of an evidence-based approach. Evidence Aid was founded in 2004. It is currently a project that is housed by the Cochrane Collaboration and Queen's University Belfast. Evidence Aid was established by several members of the international Cochrane Collaboration following the 2004 Indian Ocean earthquake and tsunami. Evidence Aid was formed to provide systematic reviews on the effects of interventions and actions of relevance prior to, in the course of and during the aftermath of disasters or other humanitarian emergencies, in order to improve health-related outcomes; their aim is to work with those who need and use this evidence (those preparing for and responding to disasters and humanitarian emergencies – policy-makers, guideline developers, trainers, as well as aid agencies and independent consultants), as well as working with researchers and publishers to facilitate freely accessible materials to meet the information needs for those facing humanitarian emergencies and disasters. Evidence Aid works in collaboration with other organizations including Public Health England; Red Cross Flanders, International Rescue Committee; Centers for Disease Control; Centre for Evidence-Based Medicine; and the University of Oxford.

== Purpose ==
Evidence Aid's purpose is to create and satisfy an increasing demand for evidence to improve the impact of humanitarian aid by stimulating the use of an evidence-based approach.

Evidence Aid collates knowledge from systematic reviews to provide a portal of resources for decision-makers. The systematic reviews seek to highlight which interventions work, which do not work, which need more research, and which, no matter how well meaning, might be harmful. Those in need have the right to receive humanitarian aid that has been proven to be effective and not harmful. With an increasing demand for "value for money", proof of impact and effectiveness in the provision of humanitarian aid it is essential to ensure that decisions and activities are evidence-based. They keep this information up to date where it can serve as a provision to other agencies, planning groups and first responders in, disasters, humanitarian crises or major healthcare emergencies.

The objectives of Evidence Aid are to:

- Establish and increase an evidence-based approach towards humanitarian action
- Uphold and promote the value of evidence in health outcomes across sectors
- Identify the gaps in evidence for humanitarian aid and build the resources and network to address them
- Raise the capacity and commitment of those who guide the humanitarian sector to implement an evidence-based approach

Evidence Aid also provides collections of evidence which are topic specific, such as collections for Ebola, the Health of Refugees and Asylum Seekers in Europe, Windstorms and Earthquakes. These collections contain evidence-based guidelines, randomised controlled trials, and other useful information.

== Resources ==
=== Team ===
Evidence Aid's office is based with the Centre for Evidence-Based Medicine (Oxford, UK) and it also has a desk in Cochrane (London, UK). The core team of four are based in two different locations. Mike Clarke, who founded the initiative and is now the chair of the board of trustees and Research Director, is a professor at Queen's University and also has a position at the Centre for Global Health, Trinity College Dublin. Jeroen Jansen, Evidence Aid's first Director, is based in London and Oxford overseeing the day-to-day management and activities of Evidence Aid, and Claire Allen, Operations Manager, who works from home in Weymouth, UK, channels the integration with the world in need and brings the project and research together to facilitate evidence-based aid when nations are at their most vulnerable. They are supported by Jane Higgins, part-time Office Administrator, based in Oxford, UK. The impact of Evidence Aid is currently undergoing impact evaluation by Dominic Mellon, a Public Health Specialty Registrar based in Bristol, UK, as part of a PhD research project supervised by Mike Clarke at Queen's.

In addition to the core team, Evidence Aid is supported by volunteers who work in various aspects of public health, humanitarian relief, and systematic reviews, where they collaborate from multiple locations around the world. Evidence Aid welcomes volunteers who are self-motivated and who can be flexible about the tasks assigned to them. Evidence Aid, as a Charity, registered with the Charity Commission in the UK also has a board of trustees which comprises Professor Mike Clarke (chair), Dr Phil Davies, Lady Deborah Dixon (Treasurer), Mr Michael Stone, and Mrs Sue Wolstenholme.

=== Special Resources ===
Evidence Aid seeks to bring together systematic reviews of relevance to disasters, humanitarian crises, and major healthcare emergencies, in a single online resource where they can be accessed free of charge and are available to anyone. Though information on best practice and low-cost interventions may be known in the medical, scientific or academic communities, this same information may not be available or easily found by communities or countries in crisis. Evidence Aid and its volunteers search the literature identifying relevant systematic reviews and works with others to produce short evidence summaries so that the information can be easily understood and applied by end users, in this case, those who have suffered as a result of disasters or those facing or who are experiencing humanitarian crises. The organization then uploads them to the searchable resource page where they are offered for the use of all. Additional resources are added as the needs are identified. For example, "Landslides: A draft chapter from the upcoming book Koenig and Schultz's Disaster Medicine: Comprehensive Principles and Practice, 2nd Edition" was made available as free access for Evidence Aid.

Separately, Evidence Aid has partnered with Cochrane to co-ordinate and administer four special collections covering: flooding and poor water sanitation; earthquakes; burns; and posttraumatic stress disorder. The Cochrane Collaboration participated in the production of these collections and they are housed on The Cochrane Library.

=== Urgent response ===
Evidence Aid is able to provide a response to disasters and humanitarian emergencies, examples as follows:

- Through its resources, it provides an urgent response to the evidence needs that arise pre, during and post event. Prior to the disaster, during and in the short-term after the event, Evidence Aid can bundle together very brief summaries of the findings of systematic reviews of relevance to, for example, the impact of windstorms depending on the nature of the event being responded to.
- Evidence Aid works with partners to provide a context-specific resource for the evidence needs that arise during the subsequent weeks and months. This is critical because no disaster will be identical and the needs of the people and nations can change over time and context. It is possible to continue to learn from each disaster in order to adapt useful and relevant problem-solving strategies to meet the current needs. As information about what works best is shared the resources should also be useful as part of the planning for disaster risk reduction and alleviating the impact of a disaster. For an example, see the response to Ebola and the European migrant crisis.
- Gathering information about the need for evidence and to seek to ensure that this need is met through up-to-date systematic reviews of the relevant research. Systematic Reviews are identified and included in the Evidence Aid resources. Evidence Aid works with volunteers and authors of systematic reviews to produce short summaries of each systematic review to help decision-makers to decide whether reading the full review is useful for their area of focus in the disaster.

=== Financial support ===
In addition to core staff and volunteer support, Evidence Aid has traditionally been financed by philanthropic organisations including, but not restricted to the McCall MacBain Foundation, the C&A FoundatioN, Wiley, and the Unorthodox Prize. Evidence Aid works to provide optimal evidence that is location specific.

== Policy setting ==
Evidence Aid has developed recommendations on evidence in humanitarian assistance which identify critical research needs and prioritizes them.

Evidence Aid was awarded funds by the International Initiative for Impact Evaluation (3ie) for a scoping study, "What evidence is available and what is required, in humanitarian assistance?" in 2014. This report was published to coincide with the anniversary of the 2004 tsunami. The aim of the study was to provide an independent analysis of the evidence base of evaluations in humanitarian assistance. It identifies areas where there are key gaps and where there is a need to prioritize rigorous evidence on issues that are most important and valuable. Evidence Aid worked with 3ie, the Karolinska Institutet, and Monash University to develop a working paper. The first scoping paper is "What evidence is available and what is required in humanitarian assistance?"

The scope of this research goes beyond the question of impact evaluation, key recommendations were made to move the provision of evidence forward in the sector, including:

- The case for evidence: agreement from policy makers on the need for an evidence base;
- Priorities for evidence: a suggested framework;
- Improved accessibility to evidence: through a one–stop portal and better classification; and
- Common guidelines and standards: through templates and standards for data collection. Medical Rehabilitation in Natural Disasters: A Systematic Review looks at how rehabilitation can be managed in the course of a natural disaster where functional resources, skilled health care personnel and equipment may be limited

Evidence Aid works with partners, contributors, and volunteers from multiple nations to achieve its aim of providing people and organizations with the knowledge tools they need to make well-informed decisions and choices in their efforts to improve health, increase the quality of life and reduce human errors in disaster management following disasters, humanitarian crises, and major healthcare emergencies.

=== Setting priorities ===
Evidence Aid helped set priorities for the Humanitarian Evidence Programme by the identification and prioritization of themes to meet the top 30 research needs for the sector for health outcomes in humanitarian response, this strategy is one way they can work with communities to ascertain what evidence is needed. This exercise is being co-ordinated by the Feinstein International Centre at Tufts University and Oxfam.

== International aid contributions ==
In supporting this mission, Evidence Aid has undertaken the following activities:

- One of Evidence Aid's first projects was to inform psychiatrists and psychotherapists responding to the Indian Ocean tsunami that counsellors should not use 'brief debriefing' (a single-session counselling service designed to prevent psychological trauma) as a means of preventing PTSD, given Cochrane Review evidence that this intervention is not effective, and, if anything, might be harmful. This decision not only led to better health for the affected population but also saved resources that were used in the deployment of more effective interventions.
- Within 24 hours of the 2010 Haiti earthquake, Evidence Aid provided the World Health Organization (WHO) with a comprehensive list of effective and efficient interventions for wound management, mental health, and infectious diseases. Evidence Aid worked with the WHO again in late 2010 to identify reviews that could assist with the widespread floods in Pakistan.
- On the day of the Great East Japan earthquake and tsunami in March 2011, Evidence Aid provided access to its online resources via The Cochrane Library, which were subsequently translated into Japanese. Evidence Aid was approached by the WHO to assist with the drafting of new public health guidelines for large-scale radiation emergencies.
- Following Typhoon Haiyan in 2013, Evidence Aid packaged together a new set of relevant resources within 48 hours, providing responders in the Philippines with information on the health problems they might encounter. The link to the resources was promoted actively to those responding to the typhoon, both on the ground and at policy level, including those coordinating the United Nations and WHO responses. Evidence Aid compiled resources to supply guidance for ways that those on the ground could increase ways to provide effective care in the aftermath of the tragedy.
- Evidence Aid worked with various individuals to create a resource for those responding to the Ebola outbreak in West Africa in the latter half of 2014. It pulled together a multitude of freely accessible resource sites into a single resource, and identified both ongoing and published systematic reviews relevant to Ebola.
- Wiley-Blackwell along with Cochrane and working with Evidence Aid, released resources and a call for disaster relief collaboration on the Nepal Earthquake Evidence Aid page. The National Library of Medicine has partnered with publishers to deliver temporary free access to major biomedical publications for healthcare professionals responding to the earthquake in Nepal. Access is available at NLM Emergency Access Initiative: User Login
- In 2016, Evidence Aid partnered with Cochrane and MSF to respond to the European migrant crisis by collating information for a collection titled the Health of Refugees and Asylum Seekers in Europe. Cochrane also collated their own reviews which resides alongside the Collection.
- A delicate concern for consideration and balance in Humanitarian aid settings is how to make aid flexible enough to meet individual needs and yet structured enough to reduce fraudulent use of limited disaster relief funds. Three recent studies explore the effects unconditional cash transfers for assistance in humanitarian disasters have on the use of health services and health outcomes for individuals in low- and middle-income countries. The studies found that although early in the disaster benefits are present, additional high-quality evidence is needed to inform best practice and policy for unconditional cash transfers in terms of timing and distribution.
- Malaria in endemic countries is a threat in disasters as stagnant water and people crowded in temporary housing can increase malaria risk. Evidence Aid has provided a free collection of references and evidence-based guidance on how to treat malaria and control malaria across geographical areas, diverse populations and in different conditions

== Raising awareness ==
Evidence Aid has raised the profile of evidence-based actions in the humanitarian sector through international conferences in Oxford in 2011 with the Centre for Evidence Based Medicine, Brussels in 2012 with the Belgian Red Cross–Flanders, at which Herman van Rompuy, the President of the European Council in 2012 said "Evidence Aid has provided governments, agencies, NGOs, and individuals with the most reliable information in order to take the right choices in difficult circumstances… the work you are doing is important for mankind", and a priority setting meeting in London in 2013. In addition, and in partnership with the South Asian Cochrane Centre, Evidence Aid offered its third conference in 2014 in Hyderabad, India – fitting since responding to the Indian Ocean tsunami was the inspiration for the founding of Evidence Aid. Evidence Aid works with a number of organizations in different capacities. Caroline Fiennes, a blogger at Third Sector, wrote about using evidence in dealing with humanitarian crises in a post, "In the decade since the Asian tsunami, we're marshalling the evidence with far better effect."

== World hunger ==
In low and middle-income countries, research has found that providing additional food to children aged three months to five years may result in modest gains in weight and height, and haemoglobin. Food supplementation resulted in positive impacts on psycho-motor development. However evidence on mental development was mixed. Disasters, war and famine increase risk for food shortages and decreased family incomes both during the disaster and in the aftermath therefore getting food to children and vulnerable populations in safe, effective and efficient ways is an important priority in crisis relief.

Malnutrition contributed to the deaths of more than three million children in 2011. Malnutrition leads to higher infection risks, plus it impairs physical and mental development making the undernourished child more susceptible to chronic disease in adulthood. A Cochrane systematic review pointed out that evidence about the effectiveness of nutrition interventions for young children, is fundamentally important. The Evidence Aid summary points to troubling news about the treatment of children in the home when food is scarce. The review found food was commonly redistributed within the family; when feeding was home-delivered, children benefited from only 36% of the energy given in the supplement. However, when the supplementary food was given in day care centers or feeding compounds, leakage was reduced; children took in 85% of the energy provided in the supplement. Supplementary food was more effective for younger children (under two years old) and for those who were poorer or less well-nourished. Quality supervision within feeding programs was found to result in a greater proportion of required daily food for energy. These discrepancies were less common in high-income countries, where two studies found no benefits for growth.

== Refugee resettlement ==
The arrival in a host country is not always the refuge of safety the displaced person hopes for. During the passage they face the challenges of substandard shelter and sanitation, and dangerously long waits for food and water through treacherous weather and with disease ridden companions. Many including the children will witness the death, abuse and torture of fellow travelers and family members. This leaves the refugees vulnerable to mental health disorders including PTSD and depression, vaccine-preventable disease, skin disease such as Impetigo, Scabies and Cellulitis, Tuberculosis, snake and insect bite, malaria and they may also be exposed to violence and sexual abuse.

This presents numerous challenges for the host countries as the conditions may not be common to their population, the refugees are unable to communicate in the host country language and their customs and culture may be at odds with the values commonly understood and practiced. Many displaced persons fear forced repatriation or detention and they are unable to navigate the bureaucracy around the local or national health care culture. This presents a public health issue as chronic health issues or respiratory infections including TB are untreated. The pregnant women may have had no prenatal care and the conflict and persecution they flee from may take its toll on their mental health. Evidence Aid has made evidence available to assist regulators, clinicians, and organizations to increase the ability of host nations to assist refugees settled or in flight. This initiative is a collaboration between Cochrane, Wiley, Kevin Pottie, Leo Ho and Evidence Aid and incorporates the contributions of many volunteers and experts in health.

=== Cochrane Podcasts ===
Cochrane does a series of podcasts on migrant health which are useful for health care professionals and the public

== Awarded "Unorthodox Prize 2013" ==
In September 2013, Evidence Aid received the "Unorthodox Prize 2013". It was one of 250 international submissions. Billions of dollars are spent annually on international humanitarian responses, yet aid budgets are not keeping pace with the increasing frequency and severity of disasters. There is also a movement to professionalize the field. Evidence Aid plays a role in this by: conducting systematic evidence reviews to identify optimal interventions and; providing this information in an easily accessible format to decision-makers and front-line relief workers. Evidence Aid bases their resources on epidemiological and evidence-based information (via systematic reviews) to meet the needs of the populations addressed.
