= Balaban, Khoy =

Balaban بلبان
- Village
- Location within Iran
- Coordinates: 38°36′41″N 44°22′51″E
- Country: Iran
- Province: West Azerbaijan
- County: Khoy
- Bakhsh: Safayyeh
- Rural District: Aland

Population (2006)
  - Total: 306
- Time zone: UTC+3:30 (IRST)
  - Summer (DST): UTC+4:30 (IRDT)

Balaban (Persian: بلبان, also Romanized as Bālābān) is a village in Aland Rural District, Safayyeh District, Khoy County, West Azerbaijan Province, Iran. At the 2006 census, its population was 306, in 63 families.
