= AMWA Journal =

The AMWA Journal is a quarterly peer-reviewed academic journal and the official publication of the American Medical Writers Association (AMWA). The journal "aims to be the authoritative, comprehensive source of information about knowledge, skills, and opportunities in the field of medical communication worldwide." The current editor is Jim Cozzarin.

== History ==
The history of the AMWA Journal is closely tied to the history of the AMWA, which had its roots in the Mississippi Valley Medical Editors Association (MVMEA). The MVMEA published The Mississippi Valley Medical Journal, which became the official journal of AMWA when AMWA absorbed MVMEA. In 1951, the Bulletin of the American Medical Writers Association was first published quarterly. The Bulletin continued into the 1960s, but some years saw more issues than others. In 1970 the AMWA Newsletter was introduced, and the editor wrote that "the inaugural issue benefited from several months of organizational silence and the leftovers of the defunct Bulletin." In 1972, the first issue of Medical Communications was published. By the late 1970s, the AMWA Newsletter was merged into Medical Communications, and, in 1985, the Board of Directors of AMWA voted to produce one official journal. The first issue of the AMWA Journal was published in the fall of 1986, with Ronald Sanchez as editor-in-chief.

== Content ==
The journal publishes feature articles, Science Series articles, Practical Matters articles, coverage of meeting sessions/chapter events, letters to the editor, media reviews, and a freelance forum. Sections include Around the Career Block, Commonplaces, Media Reviews, Practical Matters, Regulatory Insights, Social Media, Statistically Speaking, and Everyday Ethics.

Access to the most recent AMWA Journal issues is currently provided as a benefit exclusive to AMWA members. Issues published prior to 2017 can be accessed on the AMWA website.

== Abstracting and indexing ==
The AMWA Journal is selectively indexed in the CINAHL (Cumulative Index to Nursing and Allied Health Literature) database and the Modern Language Association International Bibliography.
