= Medical writing =

Type of writing used in the medical, healthcare and pharmaceuticals professions

A medical writer, also referred to as medical communicator, is a person who applies the principles of clinical research in developing clinical trial documents that effectively and clearly describe research results, product use, and other medical information. Medical writing is a form of technical writing closely associated with scientific technical writing. A medical writer is often required by regulation or organization to follow the five modules of the Common Technical Document (CTD). The CTD format is most commonly used to write white papers. Medical writers ensure these documents comply with regulatory, journal, or other guidelines in terms of content, format, and structure.

Medical writing as a function became established in the pharmaceutical, medical device industry and Contract Research Organizations (CROs) because the industry recognized that it requires specific expertise to produce well-structured documents that present information clearly and concisely. All new drugs go through the extensive process of clinical trials and regulatory procedures that lead to market approval. This demand for the clear articulation of medical science, drives the demand for well written, standards-compliant documents that medical professionals can easily and quickly read and understand. Similarly, medical institutions engage in translational research, and some medical writers have experience offering writing support to the principal investigators for grant applications and specialized publications.

The medical writing market is estimated to be USD 3.36 billion in 2020 and is growing at a 12.1% compound annual growth rate.

== Overview ==
Medical writing for the pharmaceutical industry can be classified as either regulatory medical writing or educational medical writing.

Regulatory medical writing means creating the documentation that regulatory agencies require in the approval process for drugs, devices and biologics. Regulatory documents can be huge and are formulaic. They include clinical study protocols, clinical study reports, patient informed consent forms, investigator brochures and summary documents (e.g. in Common Technical Document [CTD] format) that summarize and discuss the data a company gathers in the course of developing a medical product.

Educational medical writing means writing documents about drugs, devices and biologics for general audiences, and for specific audiences such as health care professionals. These include sales literature for newly launched drugs, data presentations for medical conferences, medical journal articles for nurses, physicians and pharmacists, consumer education and programs and enduring materials for continuing education (CE) or continuing medical education (CME). It plays a very important role in promotion of various pharmaceutical brands both to the HCPs and the consumers. Different types of communication use different media to present the writings.

Other types of medical writing include journalism and marketing, both of which can have a medical writing focus.

Regardless of the type of medical writing, companies either assign it to an in-house writer, or "outsource" it to a freelance or contract medical writer.

Artificial intelligence (AI) is starting to have an impact on medical writing. It helps in drafting regulatory and educational documents. AI-based platforms use natural language processing and machine learning to create initial drafts, format documents, and summarize data. These tools aim to make some parts of the writing process easier. However, medical writers still conduct the final review and validation to make sure everything is correct and meets requirements.

== Organizations ==
Several professional organizations represent medical writers around the world. These include:

- American Medical Writers Association (AMWA)
- Australasian Medical Writers Association (AMWA)
- European Medical Writers Association (EMWA)
- Indian Medical Writers Association (IMWA)
- Chinese Medical Writers Community (CMWC)

These organizations provide a forum where medical writers meet and share knowledge and experience. They promote professional development and standards of documentation excellence, and help writers find career opportunities. All these organizations offer fundamental medical writing training.

== Books on medical writing ==
Stephanie Deming of the Council of Science Editors compiled in 2003 a list of books that might be helpful in medical and/or science writing. In 1978 the BMJ editor Stephen Lock recommended Hawkins's 1967 book Speaking and writing in medicine and 4 other books.

== Importance of lucidity ==
The single most important feature of any article is lucidity. Useful guidelines are to write in fairly short sentences, keeping the words and phrases as simple as possible. Reading the article aloud is a good way of discovering how intelligible it is and some authors normally write their first drafts by using a tape recorder. It is also helpful to read articles written by masters of medical style, such as Richard Asher and William Boyd.

== Importance of Accessibility ==
In relation to lucidity, accessible language is key to medical writing. Especially when writing medical materials that are targeted to the general public, using simple language ensures that a wider audience can understand vital information. In the realm of healthcare, patients need their healthcare explained concisely and clearly. Additionally, patients deserve to be involved in their healthcare decisions. This has inspired what is known as "shared care" and is a driver towards more patient-centered practices. Using more accessible language in medical writing inspires shared care and levels the playing field between patients and their providers. Patients can then make critical decisions relating to their healthcare with less stress and frustration.

== Medical writing in social media ==
With the invention of the internet, social media has become a main source of information for patients concerned with certain health issues. It differs from other sources through characteristics such as instantaneous and limitless reach and user-generated content. Unfortunately, these aspects can lead to a lack of quality and reliability. User-generated content often leads to content written by unknown authors where the information itself may be incomplete, unreferenced, or informal. Also, unlike evidence-based medicine, social media tends to magnify anecdotal reports. However, there are measures available to decrease this issue. Individuals can help reduce health misconceptions online by countering false or misleading claims with clear, evidence-based responses and cited sources. Social media presents communication challenges in health discussions, but these can be addressed by minimizing technical jargon, using plain language, and maintaining a concise, professional tone. Identifying the target audience allows for a more precise and relevant approach. Skilled medical writers understand medical language and culture, enabling them to effectively tailor content for specific readerships.

== Medical writing in freelance market ==
Medical writing is a growing sector in the freelance market, with writers specializing in healthcare-related content. Freelance medical writers offer services such as writing medical articles, research papers, case studies, and regulatory documents. Many hold advanced degrees in medicine, biology, or related fields and possess expertise in medical terminology and concepts, enabling them to produce accurate and informative content.

One of the advantages of working with freelance medical writers is the ability to review their portfolio and samples of their work. Clients can also read reviews from other clients who have worked with them in the past, which helps them make informed decisions about who to hire and ensures that they receive high-quality work.

In addition, freelance medical writers offer a range of pricing options, making it possible to find a writer who fits within your budget. Some medical writers charge by the hour, while others charge by the project. This flexibility allows clients to find a writer who can provide the services they need at a price they can afford.

== See also ==
- AMWA Journal
- List of physician writers
- Medical ghostwriting
- Scientific writing
- World Association of Medical Editors (WAME)
