= Balabanov =

Balabanov (Balaban, Balabanoff, Ballabon, etc.) and their derivatives (-ovs, -ich, etc.) are common last names in North Macedonia, Serbia, Bulgaria, Ukraine and Russia. Notable people with the surname include:

- Aleksei Balabanov (1959–2013), Russian filmmaker
- Andrey Balabanov, Soviet-born Ukrainian sprint canoer
- Angelica Balabanov (1878–1965), Russian-Italian Marxist revolutionary, Comintern secretary in 1919–1921
- Hanna Balabanova (born 1969), Ukrainian sprint canoer
- Kostantyn Balabanov (born 1982), Ukrainian football player
- Vasile Balabanov (1873–1947), provincial administrator of Imperial Russia

== Origins of the name ==
Possible origins of the name according to Tudor Balabanov:

1. in the Kazakh Mountains there is an eagle called Balaban from which the name may be derived.

2. One of the recipients of this name may have been the Persians that around 4000 years ago started naming the leading three soldiers of a battalion, namely: the one with the flag, those with a drum, and the one with a blow instrument - the Balabans.

3. The Turks may have taken over this name and given it to the relatively tall non-Muslim men from their territories.

== See also ==
- Balaban (disambiguation)
- Ballabon
