= Balaban, Nusaybin =

Village in Mardin Province, Turkey

Balaban
- Neighbourhood
- Location in Turkey
- Coordinates: 37.127°N 41.512°E
- Country: Turkey
- Province: Mardin
- District: Nusaybin
- Population (2021): 347
- Time zone: UTC+3 (TRT)

Balaban (Kurdish: Birêgiriya; (Note: Also spelt as Bîrguriwa.) Syriac: Bīrgurīya) (Note: Alternatively transliterated as Bergorié, Birgirya, Birguriya, Birigirya, Birgüriye, Bīr Gūrirayyā, or Birguriya.) is a neighbourhood in the municipality and district of Nusaybin, Mardin Province in Turkey. The village is populated by Syriacs and Muslim and Yazidi Kurds of the Mizizex tribe. It had a population of 347 in 2021.

== Etymology ==
The Syriac name of the village is derived from "biro" ("well" in Syriac).

== History ==
Bīrgurīya (today called Balaban) was historically inhabited by Syriac Orthodox Christians. In the Syriac Orthodox patriarchal register of dues of 1870, it was recorded that the village had eight households, who paid thirty-five dues, and did not have a church or a priest. There were 300 Syriacs in 1914, according to the list presented to the Paris Peace Conference by the Assyro-Chaldean delegation. Amidst the Sayfo, all of the Syriacs were murdered by Kurds from Kfar-Gawze. In 1966, the population was 455, including 140 Turoyo-speaking Christians in 20 families. By 2013, there were ten Syriacs in two families and two Yazidi families.

== Bibliography ==
- Bcheiry, Iskandar (2009). The Syriac Orthodox Patriarchal Register of Dues of 1870: An Unpublished Historical Document from the Late Ottoman Period. Gorgias Press.
- Biner, Zerrin Özlem (2020). States of Dispossession: Violence and Precarious Coexistence in Southeast Turkey. University of Pennsylvania Press.
- Courtois, Sébastien de (2013). "Tur Abdin : Réflexions sur l'état présent descommunautés syriaques du Sud-Est de la Turquie, mémoire, exils, retours". Cahier du Gremmamo (in French). 21: 113–150.
- Gaunt, David (2006). Massacres, Resistance, Protectors: Muslim-Christian Relations in Eastern Anatolia during World War I. Gorgias Press.
- Jongerden, Joost; Verheij, Jelle, eds. (2012). Social Relations in Ottoman Diyarbekir, 1870-1915. Brill.
- Ritter, Hellmut (1967). Turoyo: Die Volkssprache der Syrischen Christen des Tur 'Abdin (in German). Vol. 1. Franz Steiner Verlag.
- Tan, Altan (2018). Turabidin'den Berriye'ye. Aşiretler - Dinler - Diller - Kültürler (in Turkish). Pak Ajans Yayincilik Turizm Ve Diş Ticaret Limited şirketi. ISBN 9789944360944.
- Turan, Ahmet (1993). Yezidiler Tarihçeleri Coğrafi Dağılımları İnançları Örf ve Adetleri (in Turkish).
