= Mediterranean Editors and Translators =

Mediterranean Editors and Translators (MET) is a non-profit, interdisciplinary association for language professionals who work mainly with or into English within the Mediterranean area. The association's members include translators, authors' editors, copy editors, writing and presentation coaches, teachers of academic writing, applied linguists, interpreters, professional writers and more. MET offers training workshops, an annual conference, networking and other opportunities of continuing professional development for its members. The activities of the association are guided by six objectives, as set out in its charter and summarized as follows:

1. Maintain a stable network and means to hold events for English language consultants
2. Communicate knowledge that can contribute to improving the quality of language support services available in the Mediterranean
3. Be a conduit for exchanging information between language consultants in our geographic area and those in other parts of Europe and the world
4. Stimulate research in Mediterranean communities on the needs of academics, scientists and others and on promising practices that meet their needs well
5. Identify local expertise in language support and help our experts share their knowledge with a wider audience
6. Help users of language support services locate appropriate solutions to their needs and promote mutual understanding between suppliers and users of these services

== History and organization ==
MET was founded in Barcelona, Spain, in the spring of 2006 after an initial, exploratory meeting the preceding autumn. It is registered in the Generalitat de Catalunya and has a legally binding charter (written in Catalan but translated into English). Its activities are directed by a Governing Council. The council, elected every two years, is composed of council chair and vice-chair, secretary, treasurer, officers for membership, continuing professional development and promotion, and a webmaster.

MET is a member of the Spanish Network of the Anna Lindh Euro-Mediterranean Foundation for the Dialog Between Cultures. To facilitate collaboration on continuing professional development activities, MET signed a memorandum of understanding with the Institute of Translation and Interpreting (ITI). MET also maintains relationships with: Associazione Italiana Traduttori e Interpreti (AITI), Associació Professional de Traductors i Intèrprets de Catalunya (APTIC), Associação Portuguesa de Tradutores e Intérpretes (APTRAD), Asociación Española de Traductores, Correctores e Intérpretes (ASETRAD), European Association of Science Editors (EASE), Eastern Mediterranean Association of Medical Editors (EMAME), Nordic Editors and Translators (NEaT), SENSE (based in the Netherlands), and Chartered Institute of Editing and Proofreading (CIEP). The founding of NEaT was inspired by, and based on information from, MET. MET and all these "sister associations" support each other to improve and promote the work of language professionals.

== Members and membership ==
MET's members are mostly based in the Mediterranean region and elsewhere in Europe, but some members from further away join because of their shared interests. MET has both individual and institutional members.

MET's approximately 450 individual members hail from over 35 countries, mostly in Europe but also in North America, South America, Asia and Africa (data of February 2025). They are employed in freelance, entrepreneurial and institutional settings and work in a wide range of subject areas including science, technology, engineering, medicine, business, commerce, finance, law, politics, art and other cultural areas. Because of the association's focus on communication in the English language, many members originate from countries where English is the vernacular.

MET's institutional membership is a way for institutions and companies to access continuing professional development activities for their staff and to support the association's mission. Currently there are about 10 institutional members.

== Conferences ==
MET holds a conference every year, usually in early autumn. This is also the occasion for the general assembly of the members. Conferences tend to last 1.5 days and are preceded by two half-days of training workshops. Each “MET meeting” is named with the acronym of METM followed by the last two digits of the year. For example, METM20 was the name given to the 2020 meeting, which was scheduled for October 2020 but cancelled due to the COVID-19 pandemic. METM25 will be held in Barcelona.

Previous METMs and their themes are:

- METM24, Carcassonne: Crossroads: coming together, crafting the future
- METM23, Mantua: The underlying story
- METM22, San Sebastián: The personal touch
- METM21, online: The style issue
- METM19, Split: Make it count: communicating with clarity and concision
- METM18, Girona: Giving credit where credit's due: recognition for authors, translators and editors
- METM17, Brescia: Understanding our clients: the writing process from concept to completion
- METM16, Tarragona: Raising standards through knowledge sharing and peer training
- METM15, Coimbra: Versatility and readiness for new challenges (held in conjunction with PRISEAL 3: Publishing and Presenting Research Internationally)
- METM14, San Lorenzo de El Escorial: Innovation and tradition: mining the human resource
- METM13, Poblet Monastery (Vimbodí i Poblet, Spain): Language, culture and identity
- METM12, Venice: Craft and critical vision—diving beneath the surface of discourse
- METM11, Barcelona: Quality in English translation and editing—from research to practice and back
- METM10, Tarragona: Facilitating knowledge transfer—editing, translating, coaching
- METM09, Barcelona: Translation, editing, writing—broadening the scope and setting limits
- METM08, Split: Communication support across the disciplines
- METM07, Madrid: Building bridges, constructing networks
- METM06, Barcelona: International communication—promising practices
- METM05, Barcelona: Interdisciplinary collaboration—international communication

== Workshop program ==
MET offers an annual workshop programme with sessions held online or in person at a Mediterranean location during the spring and summer. A full day of workshops is also offered prior to the annual conference. The workshops are usually developed and delivered by MET members and offer continuing professional development for editors and translators. The topics dealt with include knowledge updates in specialized fields, language issues, tools for language professionals, and business development.

== Publications ==
MET members have written a guide entitled "The English-Language Consultant: MET’s guidelines for choosing an editor, translator, interpreter or other language service provider"; the second, revised edition is available on the association's website.

Discussions at MET conferences have led to the publication of several books about how language professionals support academic writing and publishing. In 2013, a limited group of MET members and their colleagues published the edited volume Supporting Research Writing: Roles and challenges in multilingual settings (based on a panel discussion at METM09). This experience motivated one MET member to continue studying a specific type of editing and led to the publication in 2016 of Editing Research: The author editing approach to providing effective support to writers of research articles; this book is based, in part, on qualitative interviews of authors' editors, including MET members. In 2017, another group of members, invited speakers and colleagues published the edited volume Publishing Research in English as an Additional Language: Practices, pathways and potentials (based on talks presented at METM15; free e-book). A METM17 keynote talk on how to facilitate writing retreats inspired a few MET members and colleagues who work as facilitators to publish, in 2023, the edited volume Women Writing Socially in Academia: Dispatches from writing rooms.

Additional publications by MET members related to the annual conferences, including reviews of the meetings and papers based on the presentations, are listed on the association's website.
