= Pharmaceutical publication planning =

Pharmaceutical publication planning is the activity of planning the dissemination of scientific and clinical data on a drug to healthcare professionals at scientific congresses and medical society meetings and in peer reviewed medical journals.

== Procedure ==
Pharmaceutical publication planning involves developing a detailed plan that outlines the timely presentation of verified scientific and clinical data to appropriate types of healthcare professionals such as physicians, pharmacists, nurses, as a drug undergoes clinical trials and after it is marketed. Because of scientific and therapeutic advances, pharmaceutical publication planning has become a well-established and important function by pharmaceutical companies in order to educate healthcare professionals accordingly about new drugs and marketed drugs with new clinical uses or safety information.

Within pharmaceutical companies, publication planning is usually overseen by medical or clinical affairs professionals. In this effort, pharmaceutical companies frequently use the assistance of medical communication agencies with publication planning expertise and professional medical writers.

== Medical communication agencies ==
Medical communication agencies include a broad range of organizations, including those that focus largely or exclusively on publication planning. When developing and executing a publication plan on behalf of a pharmaceutical or biotechnology client, medical communication agencies employ professional publication strategists, scientific medical directors, medical writers and project managers. Working as a team, this group of individuals delves deep into their client's scientific discoveries, and propose the most effective and efficient ways to spread the word about new potential therapies to physicians and other healthcare providers.

There has been some discussion in the media regarding disclosure as it pertains to the use of professional medical writers in this endeavor. Some agencies and professional organizations focused on publication planning have been and continue to develop and refine ethical guidelines and standards for disclosure and transparency.

== Professional publication planning associations ==
Professional organizations for individuals involved in pharmaceutical publication planning include the International Society of Medical Publication Professionals (ISMPP) and The International Publication Planning Association (TIPPA). The purpose of these organizations is to create a forum where individuals involved with pharmaceutical publication planning and biomedical publications can meet and share knowledge and experience. They serve to promote career opportunities and professional development of individuals involved with pharmaceutical publication planning, as well as to promote standards of excellence in ethical professional medical writing and the biomedical publication process in disseminating scientific and clinical data on pharmaceutical products.

In 2009, ISMPP began a certification program for publication planning professionals.
