= Science and Development Network =

- Type: Online Media Outlet
- Founder: David Dickson
- Founded: 2001
- Website: www.scidev.net

SciDev.Net, short for Science and Development Network, is an online source of news and analysis about science and technology in the context of global development. It aims to help individuals and organisations apply science to decision-making in order to promote sustainable development and poverty reduction.

== History ==
SciDev.Net was founded in 2001 by David Dickson as a science news service for developing countries. It originated from a project set up by news staff at the journal Nature (with financial assistance from the Wellcome Trust, United Kingdom) to report on the World Conference on Science, in Budapest, in 1999. It was established in response to the significant gap in scientific knowledge between rich and poor countries and with the understanding that "those who stand to benefit the most from modern science and technology are also those with the least access to information about it." SciDev.Net seeks to redress this imbalance via its free-to-access website, regional networks, and science communications training.

== Ownership ==
Since 2017, SciDev.Net has been owned by CABI (CAB International), a not-for-profit organisation focusing primarily on agricultural and environmental issues in low- and middle-income countries, and the creation, curation, and dissemination of scientific knowledge. SciDev.Net operates editorially independently from CABI with its content overseen by an independent Editorial Advisory Group whose role is to ensure its editorial independence protocol is adhered to. SciDev.Net has a global edition, which is based at CABI's headquarters in Wallingford, Oxfordshire, and there are five regional desks covering Latin America and the Caribbean, the Middle East and North Africa, Asia and Pacific, and Sub-Saharan Africa (English and French).

== Website ==
The SciDev.Net website is made up of a global edition and five regional editions. It publishes in four languages: English, Spanish, French, and Arabic. Content includes news, analysis, opinions, in-depth features, podcasts, and data visualisations. Content is categorised under the following topics: agriculture, environment, health, governance, enterprise and communication. Articles are written mostly by freelance journalists, the majority of whom are based in low- and middle-income countries.

== Podcasts ==
SciDev.Net's Sub-Saharan Africa editions produce a podcast series in English (Africa Science Focus), French (Santé, Science et Développement) and Arabic (The Spark). The podcasts feature scientists from across Africa and the Middle East talking about topical science issues and the impact of science on development in the region. In 2021, the Africa Science Focus podcast was awarded silver in the AAAS Kavli Science Journalism Awards. The podcasts are published on the website and are available to download from a range of other platforms.

== Creative Commons ==
All SciDev.Net website material is free to reproduce under a Creative Commons Attribution 2.0 licence. Under the terms of this licence, users are permitted to copy, distribute, display and perform the content, and make derivative works, so long as the original author and website are quoted as the source. Hundreds of media outlets have syndicated SciDev.Net's work including global media houses such as The Guardian, The BBC and The Thomson Reuters Foundation as well as regional news outlets like AllAfrica, The Asian Scientist and El Espectador.

== Training: Script ==
SciDev.Net trains researchers and journalists to improve the communication of scientific research to the public and policymakers through its science communication training programme, Script. Script provides online training on science communication skills. This aims to enable researchers to simplify complex findings and engage non-specialist audiences and equip journalists to report on science accurately, enhancing public understanding of science. Over the past ten years, Script has trained more than 10,000 researchers and journalists worldwide. It seeks to facilitate connections between researchers and journalists, fostering collaboration to increase media coverage of scientific research. Script supports universities in integrating science communication modules into journalism curricula, with the aim of ensuring that future journalists are equipped to report on scientific issues. By strengthening the communication of scientific findings, the programme aims to promote greater public awareness and the use of evidence in decision-making at policy and personal levels, to enhance the impact of scientific research.

== Communications ==
Visitors who sign-up with SciDev.Net receive a free weekly email with all the latest stories from the website. These are available in English, Spanish, Arabic and French. Readers can also submit announcements, events, jobs and grants to SciDev.Net's noticeboard for free and these are featured on the website and in the weekly emails.

== Funders ==
SciDev.Net's primary funders are the Swedish International Development Cooperation Agency (SIDA)[ and the International Development Research Centre (IDRC). Other organisations that have supported its content include: the American Association for the Advancement of Science (AAAS), the Bill & Melinda Gates Foundation, Wellcome, the European Journalism Centre, Adaptation Research Alliance, and Carnegie Corporation of New York. SciDev.Net works with a range of organisations at global, regional and national levels to achieve shared objectives. These include: the World Academy of Sciences (TWAS); the science news service AlphaGalileo, and the World Federation of Science Journalists.
