= World Association of Medical Editors =

International association of medical journal editors

- Abbreviation: WAME
- Formation: March 16, 1995; 31 years ago
- Founded at: Bellagio, Lombardy, Italy
- Type: Nonprofit
- Purpose: Medical Education
- Headquarters: Chicago
- Region served: International
- Members: 1,830 (2017)
- President: Jose Florencio F. Lapeña
- Vice President: Rajeev Kumar
- Secretary: Jagdish Khubchandani
- Treasurer: Murad Alam
- Board of directors: Omid Beiki, Edsel Ing
- Key people: Margaret Winker, Lorraine Ferris, Ana Marušić, Peush Sahni
- Volunteers: 15
- Website: wame.org

The World Association of Medical Editors (abbreviated WAME, pronounced "whammy") is an international, virtual organization of editors of medical journals. It was originally founded in 1995 by a group of members of the International Committee of Medical Journal Editors (ICMJE), who had grown concerned that the ICMJE had become "too small, self-serving, and exclusive". It was launched on March 16, 1995 in Bellagio, Lombardy, Italy, after a three-day conference to discuss ways to enable greater international cooperation between editors of medical journals. The conference was attended by twenty-two editors from thirteen countries, all funded by the Rockefeller Foundation. One of those in attendance was Iain Chalmers. Any editor of a peer-reviewed biomedical journal is eligible to join WAME.

== Past Presidents ==
- Richard Horton (United Kingdom) March 1995 - Nov 1996
- Drummond Rennie (USA) Dec 1997 - Dec 1999
- Fiona Godlee (United Kingdom) Jan 2000 - Dec 2001
- Ana Marusic (Croatia) Jan 2002 - Dec 2003
- Peush Sahni (India) Jan 2004 - Dec 2005
- Michael Callaham (USA) Jan 2006 - Dec 2007
- Margaret Winker (USA) Jan 2008 - Dec 2009
- John Overbeke (Netherlands) Jan 2010 - Dec 2011
- Farrokh Habibzadeh (Iran) Jan 2012 - Dec 2013
- Lorraine Ferris (Canada) Jan 2014 - Dec 2015
- Rod Rohrich (USA) Jan 2016 - Dec 2017
- Christine Laine (USA) Jan 2018 - Dec 2019
- Rob Siebers (New Zealand) Jan 2020 - June 2022
- Rakesh Aggarwal (India) July 2022 - June 2024
- Chris Zielenski (UK) July 2024- January 2026
