= Council of Science Editors =

United States–based nonprofit organization

The Council of Science Editors (CSE), formerly the Council of Biology Editors (CBE; 1965–2000) and originally the Conference of Biology Editors (CBE; 1957–1965), is a United States–based nonprofit organization that supports editorial practice among scientific writers. In 2008, the CSE adopted the slogan "CSE: Education, Ethics, and Evidence for Editors (E4)".

A volunteer board of directors leads the Council, with the assistance of several committees. CSE is managed by Riggs Enterprise Corp, located in New Jersey.

== History and organization ==
The organization was established in 1957 by the National Science Foundation and the American Institute of Biological Sciences as the Conference of Biology Editors (CBE). In 1965, the organization incorporated as the Council of Biology Editors "and soon thereafter expanded membership to include all scientific publishing endeavors from science editors to copy editors." On January 1, 2000, it was renamed the Council of Science Editors.

The membership of CSE comprises editorial professionals, mainly in the United States.

As well as providing services and advice online, CSE holds an annual meeting that includes short courses on topics such as journal editorship, publication management, manuscript editing, and journal metrics.

== Publications ==
CSE publishes a style guide for scientific papers, The CSE Manual, Ninth Edition: Scientific Style and Format for Authors, Editors, and Publishers, Council of Science Editors.

As of 2024, it is in the 9th edition, and has been renamed The CSE Manual The 8th edition was published in 2014, the 7th edition in 2006, and the 6th in 1994.

CSE has partnered with the University of Chicago Press to use the successful online platform of The Chicago Manual of Style (which provides users with search and personal annotation of the manual) to publish the CSE Manual online. Through this partnership, the eighth edition and ninth edition are available online.

Science Editor is the quarterly publication of the CSE; after one year, articles are available as open access (delayed open access).
