= Language industry =

The language industry is the sector of activity dedicated to facilitating multilingual communication, both oral and written. According to the European Commission's Directorate-General of Translation, the language industry comprises following activities: translation, interpreting, subtitling, dubbing, software and website globalisation, language technology tools development, international conference organisation, language teaching and linguistic consultancy.

According to the Canadian Language Industry Association, this sector comprises translation (as seen in interpreting, subtitling and localisation), language training and language technologies.

The European Language Industry Association limits the sector to translation, localisation, internationalisation and globalisation.

An older, perhaps outdated view confines the language industry to computerised language processing and places it within the information technology industry.

An emerging view expands this sector to include editing for authors who write in a second language, especially English, for international communication.

== Services ==
The scope of services in the industry includes:

- Translation industry
- Editing for authors: author editing
- Editing for publishers, e.g. copy editing, proofreading (including computer-assisted reviewing), developmental editing
- Language interpretation
- Language education
- Computer-assisted translation tools development
- Terminology extraction
- Language localisation
- Software localisation
- Machine translation

The persons who facilitate multilingual communication by offering individualized services—translation, interpreting, editing or language teaching—are called language professionals.

== Evolution ==
Translation (and interpretation) as activities, have existed since mankind started developing trade. That is to say that the origins of language industry are older than those of written language.

The communication industry has developed rapidly following availability of the internet. Achievements of the industry include the ability to quickly translate long texts into many languages. This has created new challenges as compared with the traditional activity of translators, such as that of quality assurance. There are various quality standards such as the International Organization for Standardization's ISO 17100 (used in Europe), the CAN CGSB 131.10-2017 in Canada and ASTM F2575-14 in the US.

A study commissioned by the European Commission's Directorate-General for Translation estimated the language industry in European member states to be worth 8.4 billion euro in 2008. The largest portion, 5.7 billion euros, was ascribed to the activities of translation, interpreting, software localisation and website globalisation. Editing was not taken into consideration. The study projected an annual growth rate of 10% for the language industry. At the time the study was published, in 2009, the language industry was less affected by the economic crisis than other industry sectors.

One field of research in the industry includes the possibility of machine translation fully replacing human translation.

== Controversies ==
Rates for translation services have been in discussion as several translation outsourcers allegedly go in search of cheap labor. Professional associations like the International Association of Professional Translators and Interpreters have in the past tried to put a stop to this development. Currency fluctuation is yet another important factor.

Apart from this, other phenomena such as crowdsourcing appear in large-scale translations.

US President Barack Obama drew criticism after a 2009 White House white paper proposed incentives for automatic translation.
