= Author editing =

Editing an author's draft in preparation for its submission to publishers

An authors' editor is a language professional who works "with authors to make draft texts fit for purpose". They edit manuscripts that have been drafted by the author (or authors) but have not yet been submitted to a publisher for publication. This type of editing is called author editing, to distinguish it from other types of editing done for publishers on documents already accepted for publication: an authors' editor works "with (and, commonly, for) an author rather than for a publisher". A term sometimes used synonymously with authors' editor is "manuscript editor" which, however, is less precise as it also refers to editors employed by scholarly journals to edit manuscripts after acceptance (in place of the term copy editor).

Authors' editors usually work with academic authors, researchers, and scientists writing scholarly journal articles, books and grant proposals. Thus, the authors' editor facilitates the academic writing process by acting before submission or peer review. Authors' editors may also help authors revise manuscripts after peer review, but once the document is accepted for publication the collaboration ends (and other editors, for example, a copy editor or production editor, take over).

== The work of authors' editors ==
An author's collaboration with an authors' editor begins after a manuscript has been drafted. The manuscript must be drafted in the desired publishing language: author editing does not include a translation. The manuscript must be relatively complete, as author editing does not include the tasks of drafting or writing. If authors need help conceiving, structuring or writing their text, then they require the work of a developmental editor, or a writer (e.g. medical writer or technical writer).

The goal of author editing is to help authors produce a clear, accurate, and effective document that meets readers' expectations and that will be favorably received by publishers, journal editors and peer reviewers. Therefore, authors' editors do both linguistic editing and substantive editing (editing of "substance", i.e. content). They improve format, structure, grammar, style, data presentation, argumentation, flow, and accuracy. They query authors about unclear content, inform and educate authors about good writing techniques (called "didactic editing"), and engage authors in revising the text (they "elicit revision"). Rather than simply correct the text, they collaborate with authors by dialoguing with them (through in-text comments, email, phone, internet telephony, etc.) about the content and style; examples of how they annotate texts and negotiate the acceptability of the language have been given in an essay by Burrough-Boenisch. Authors' editors may also advise authors on peer review and the publishing process, and high-impact publishing strategies.

When authors receive the revised manuscript, they usually must dedicate substantial time and effort to reviewing the editor's changes and queries. They may discuss the work with the editor, to learn why certain changes were made, and to resolve issues that were raised during editing. After they have revised the text, they may resubmit it to the editor for an additional round of editing (if the fee agreement so permits) or finalize it on their own.

== Author editing and authors' writing skills ==
The authors' editor is an optional figure in the publishing process. Authors are more likely to hire an authors' editor when they are not fluent in the language in which they wish to publish: this is particularly the case for non-anglophone academics and scientists who publish their research in English for international communication. Another reason for working with an authors' editor regards the author's writing skills, as some scientists and clinicians may face difficulties composing an adequate text in a reasonable amount of time despite being excellent researchers.

Skilled writers will not need to hire such an editor, instead finding sufficient the feedback of colleagues (prior to submitting a manuscript) and peer reviewers (after submission). Nonetheless, even skilled writers may benefit from author editing, especially when they are short of time and have ambitious publishing goals. In fact, since these editors can save researchers time, help them improve their writing, and maximize their chances of publication success, when a regular collaboration is established, authors' editors can become trusted allies of research teams.

Less skilled writers who are aware that editing will improve their manuscripts (or have been told to seek editing by a journal or publisher) also may not go to an authors' editor, but instead may use one of the many specialized editing firms (for convenience, greater availability, possibly lower costs). However, these firms, for their global nature, do not always permit the establishment of the collaborative relationship between editor and author-clients which is necessary for true author editing. Finally, novice writers may not realize how they can benefit by presubmission author editing; by submitting unedited manuscripts, they may find themselves in a situation of multiple rejections.

== Origins ==
Although the term "authors' editor" is little known, even by persons whose work could accurately be called author editing, it is not new but has been in use at least since the 1970s. The roots of this profession seem to lie in the arena of medical editing in the United States. The first known use of the term to describe an editor working in the research setting dates to 1968, in an essay by Mayo Clinic editor Bernard Forscher. In 1973, an article entitled "The author's editor" by L.B. Applewhite was published in the first volume of the journal Medical Communications of the American Medical Writers Association. In 1974, an essay by Barbara G. Cox with the same title was published in the Mayo Clinic Proceedings. In the early 1980s, the Council of Biology Editors (now the Council of Science Editors) began to define and discuss the role of authors' editors, through a seminal paper by Martha M. Tacker followed by a national survey of 100 scientific authors' editors, both published in the journal CBE Views (now Science Editor). The survey sparked an editorial in the Canadian Medical Association Journal. These early papers used the term "author's editor" (with author in singular) but today, when academic papers usually have multiple authors, the pluralized term "authors' editor" is becoming standard usage.

The term "authors' editor" seems to have its roots in American literary publishing. It was used in 1953, in the title of a Doctor of Education thesis, to describe Maxwell Perkins, a literary editor who helped shape American literature in the first half of the twentieth century. The earliest use of the term in print is attributed to US novelist George Washington Cable in a 1910 tribute to his editor Richard Watson Gilder.

== See also ==
- Language professional
- Developmental editing
- Ghostwriter
- Social edition
- Jeannette Hopkins (editor)
