= Technical translation =

Type of translation

Technical translation is a type of specialized translation involving the translation of documents produced by technical writers (owner's manuals, user guides, etc.), or more specifically, texts which relate to technological subject areas or texts which deal with the practical application of scientific and technological information. While the presence of specialized terminology is a feature of technical texts, specialized terminology alone is not sufficient for classifying a text as "technical" since numerous disciplines and subjects which are not "technical" possess what can be regarded as specialized terminology. Technical translation covers the translation of many kinds of specialized texts and requires a high level of subject knowledge and mastery of the relevant terminology and writing conventions.

The importance of consistent terminology in technical translation, for example in patents, as well as the highly formulaic and repetitive nature of technical writing makes computer-assisted translation using translation memories and terminology databases especially appropriate. In his book Technical Translation, Jody Byrne argues that technical translation is closely related to technical communication and that it can benefit from research in this and other areas such as usability and cognitive psychology.

In addition to making texts with technical jargon accessible for a wider ranging audience, technical translation also involves linguistic features of translating technological texts from one language to another.

Translation as a whole is a balance of art and science influenced by both theory and practice. Having knowledge of both the linguistic features as well as the aesthetic features of translation applies directly to the field of technical translation.

== Background ==
As a field, technical translation has been recognized, studied, and developed since the 1960s. Stemming from the field of translation studies, the field of technical translation traditionally emphasized much importance on the source language from which text is translated. However, over the years there has been a movement away from this traditional approach to a focus on the purpose of the translation and on the intended audience. This is perhaps because only 5–10% of items in a technical document are terminology, while the other 90–95% of the text is language, most likely in a natural style of the source language. Though technical translation is only one subset of the different types of professional translation, it is the largest subset as far as output is concerned. Currently, more than 90% of all professionally translated work is done by technical translators, highlighting the importance and significance of the field.

== Methods and practices ==
=== Technical translator ===
The role of the technical translator is to not only be a transmitter of information, but also to be a constructor of procedural discourse and knowledge through meaning, particularly because often, the technical translator may also take on the role of the technical writer. Research has demonstrated that technical communicators do, in fact, create new meaning as opposed to simply repackaging (198) old information. This emphasizes the important role that technical translators play in making meaning, whether they are doing technical translation in one language or in multiple languages.

Much like professionals in the field of technical communication, the technical translator must have a cross-curricular and multifaceted background. In addition to grasping theoretical and linguistic orientations for the actual translation process, an understanding of other subjects, such as cognitive psychology, usability engineering, and technical communication, is necessary for a successful technical translator. Additionally, most technical translators work within a specialized field such as medical or legal technical translation, which highlights the importance of an interdisciplinary background. Finally, the technical translators should also become familiar with the field of professional translation through training.

Technical translation requires a solid knowledge base of technological skills, particularly if the translator chooses to utilize computer-assisted translation (CAT) or machine translation (MT). Though some technical translators complete all translation without the use of CAT or MT, this is often with pieces that require more creativity in the document. Documents dealing with mechanics or engineering that contain frequently translated phrases and concepts are often translated using CAT or MT.

=== Translating technical texts ===
Analysis

Translators might read the document to understand what they will be translating, and determine the context of the text. In technical translation, the register and tone would then be determined based on the type of text and the context, although generally the tone of technical texts are neutral. The register can be very formal and scientific, or made to be easily understood by the general public. A translator might also need to use documentation techniques find resource materials as aids in order to translate the text.

Comprehension

Depending on the translator's experience and nature or the text, the translator might need to assess the degree of difficulty and type of difficulty in a text, such as whether they are able to translate the text properly in a timely manner, or whether there are more specific translation problems that they do not understand. Often, translators may have an area of expertise, and may be very familiar with certain terminology and texts. However, when a translator cannot learn all of the subject knowledge, it is possible to transfer over knowledge from other subjects that might be similar in nature, or do some research.

Research enables translators to have a "good and solid understanding of the basic principles and technologies…" The translator must not only translate the terminology, but also the style in which the author originally wrote the document, to create the same effect in the target language. Along with previous subject knowledge, research helps the translator understand the basics of the text. Some of the tools a technical translator might use are glossaries, encyclopedias, and technical dictionaries, most of which may be recently published, as technology evolves quickly. The translator must always keep up to date with new technologies in the field they are translating into, by attending conferences or courses, or subscribing to magazines, so that they are using the latest terminology.

In the case of terminological or language issues that the translator cannot solve on their own, the translator may do research or call on the experts of a particular field for more clarification and explanations. This includes working with all types of workers in certain technological and industrial fields, such as engineers, managers, etc. Two types of experts that a translator may consult while translating are the author who wrote the text in the source language and the expert in the target language. The author can explain the context and what they are trying to say, whereas the expert in the target language may be able to explain the terminology or what the author was trying to convey in the target language. Translation is teamwork rather than strict cooperation between the translator and the experts. However, if the information the experts provided does not resolve problems, for example, if there are terms that are difficult to translate and some that cannot be translated, it may be possible to explain concepts in the target language through examples.

Translation

Translators may bounce back and forth between steps, depending on their time constraints and their experience in translation. For instance they might revise at the same time as they are translating. A translator may also go through their reference materials and research depending on how familiar they are with the type of text. If they need to find the closest matches for clients, they may use translation memories or machine translation software. The translation process also depends on the laws and ethics codes put into place in certain regions, as well as any censorship, which might affect the outcome of the text.

Revision

Revision may depend on the translator's experience or nature of the text. In translation agencies, revisers may be hired to do the revising, but a freelancer may have to revise their own work. In the case of a pharmaceutical text, depending on the laws, it would require revision since the information in the source text could cause potential harm if mistranslated. There also may be certain style guides that the translation agencies may use that must be followed.

==== Technical writing ====
Although technical writing and technical translation may be similar in the content they work with, they are different as translators translate what the technical writers produce. The purpose of technical writing, is to explain how to do something. Technical translating is similar, however it attempts to communicate how someone else explains how something is done. "The technical translator, like the technical writer, wants to produce a document that is clear and easy to understand". Translators may also consider controlled language and whether it applies in their target language culture.

=== Machine translation ===
==== Overview ====
Practitioners within the field of technical translation often employ what is called machine translation (MT), or machine-assisted translation. This method of translation uses various types of computer software to generate translations from a source language to a target language without the assistance of a human. There are different methods of machine translation. A plethora of machine translators in the form of free search engines are available online. However, within the field of technical communication, there are two basic types of machine translators, which are able to translate massive amounts of text at a time. There are transfer-based and data-driven machine translators. Transfer-based machine translation systems, which are quite costly to develop, are built by linguists who determine the grammar rules for the source and target languages. The machine works within the rules and guidelines developed by the linguist. Due to the nature of developing rules for the system, this can be very time-consuming and requires an extensive knowledge base about the structures of the languages on the part of the linguist; nonetheless, the majority of commercial machine translators are transfer-based machines. Yahoo! BabelFish is a common example of a platform that uses this type of translation technology.

Data-driven machine translators, also known as statistical-based machine translators, work by aggregating massive amounts of previously translated bits of information, and uses statistical analysis to determine matches between the source language and target language with the previously aggregated corpora. This method is less expensive and requires less development time than transfer-based machine translation, but the generated translation is often not to the same quality as transfer-based translation. The translation services offered through Google use transfer-based translation technology. Technical translation could raise privacy concerns for some professional or corporate translators.

==== Effectiveness ====
For technical translators without access to expensive machinery, the Internet hosts many online translation sites that are either free or require a small fee. Some research has been done in order to test the effectiveness of various online translation tools. In one article, researchers looked at the success of online machine translators in retrieving appropriate search results. Looking at Google translator, Babelfish (previous to the merge of Babelfish and Yahoo!), Yahoo!, and Prompt, test searches were based on translating key search words and comparing the search results with a monolingual search. Using computer-based statistical analysis, the results showed that translated search results were only 10% less effective than a monolingual search, making the translated search fairly successful in retrieving appropriate information. However, the success in this particular study was only possible when English was one of the target languages.

Other research points to the effectiveness of machine translation when paired with human interaction. In a mixed methods experiment, researchers first examined the effectiveness of machine translations using statistical analysis and then used subjects to test out a new type of machine translation (TransType2) that required human interaction as a part of the translation process. The results of the experiment showed that human interaction is a vital supplement for overall accuracy in machine translations. This research demonstrates the importance of the role that technical translators can play in the process of translating technical documents.

==== Advantages ====
While no machine translation device is able to replicate or replace the dynamics of a human translator, machine translation certainly poses important advantages. In fact, there are many practical uses for and implications of machine translation for the field of technical translation. Machine translation has major cost advantages as compared to human translation. In fields of technical communication where information is constantly changing, for example, the stock market or jobs related to the weather, the cost of paying a human translator to constantly update information would become quite expensive. Additionally, situations that involve translating massive volumes of information over a short period of time, or situations that require speedy and frequent communication would benefit from machine translation. In such circumstances, a machine translator would be advantageous from a financial perspective.

== Culture ==
=== Translating culture ===
Just as important as proper translation of linguistic qualities of languages is the subject of culture and how specific cultural features are transferred and communicated in the field of technical translation. In fact, a mutual understanding of cultural components is just as important as linguistic knowledge in technical translation. This highlights the complicated nature of working with technical translation. Various cultures can exhibit drastic differences in how communication occurs, even when both cultures are working with the same target language. One Canadian technical translator and consultant working with Russian colleagues detailed difficulties while working with both North American English and global English. Encountering discrepancies in rhetorical writing strategies, differentiation in tones, document formatting issues, and conflicting conceptual goals for engineering reports, the author emphasizes cultural practices, outside of the direct realm of linguistic forms, that can impede proper communication in technical translation.

In an example using a commonly translated document, the United Nations' Universal Declaration of Human Rights, a researcher used correlation analyses, including semantic network analysis and spatial modeling, to interpret data describing differences among seven different translated versions of the document. Demonstrating how culture plays an important role in the process of technical translation, the results of the study showed that while the translations were fairly similar, cultural subtleties and differences existed in each language's translated version. For example, across the seven languages, common words such as "people", "individual", "man", "nation", "law", "faith", and "family' had differing levels of importance in relation to other words in the language. While in Arabic the word "man" exhibited high levels of importance in the text, other languages placed higher levels of importance with words such as "person" or "individual". In another example, the English word for "entitle" and the Chinese word for "enjoy" carried connotations attached to the concept of "rights", demonstrating a linkage of concepts unique to each individual language. These slight differences demonstrate the culturally specific nuances that exist across languages.

As with any type of non-MT, it is still a process completed by human beings, making it impossible for total objectivity. International technical communication cannot ignore cultural differences, so seeing how the differences affect translation is fundamental for professionals in the field.

Additionally, one's cultural knowledge base, or lack thereof, can be detrimental to the effectiveness of communication, particularly when communicating warnings or risk factors. Considering how differing knowledge paradigms as a result of cultural factors can prompt people to respond in a variety of ways to different rhetorical strategies, particularly when communicating messages containing warnings of hazards or risks, understanding culture must be a priority in technical translation. One researcher found that a variance of definition of terms and inconsistent paradigms of cultural knowledge highlight the need for a new delineation of what technical writers consider as the target audience while communicating risk factors. What might be appropriate for one audience must be reconsidered for a culturally different audience. Looking at a specific example concerning the hazardous occupation of mining, one piece of research demonstrates how different cultures exhibit different perceptions about safety information. Comparing risk communication in mining in the United States and the United Kingdom, the researcher discovered variations among the perceptions of who is responsible for promoting safety in the workplace. While one culture felt that the user or worker was responsible for promoting his or her own safety in the workplace, another culture perceived the science behind the process or document to be responsible for the promotion of safety. As risks, warnings, or cautions are often important components of a technical document in need of translation, the technical translator will understand how such cultural differences can affect the effectiveness of the translated message. Avoiding assumptions about a culture and allowing one's own knowledge base to consider more diverse populations will create more effective cross-cultural communication not only when working with risky environments, but in general communication as well.

Some research has investigated the possibility of a universal writing style in order to help with the translatability of writing across different cultures and languages. However, demonstrating the difficulty of such a task, one researcher addressed the assumption that unambiguous wording eases effective communication. He gave examples from certain Asian contexts when unclear communication was actually helpful because the unequivocal language forced communicators to rely more heavily on oral discourse than on written documents. The example of the effectiveness about ambiguous language not only shows problems with a universal writing style for technical translation, but also reiterates another example of how culture plays an important role in proper technical translation.

=== Culture and technology ===
In an age where technology allows for increased accessibility and faster communication, the technical translator must understand the role that culture plays in how people interact with, react to, and utilize technology and how these culturally related concepts can affect communicated messages.

Demonstrating how technology use differs across cultures, one researcher created a presentation that took a holistic look at preparing documents for ethnically diverse audiences, pointing out other non-linguistic topics that require special attention in communication across cultures. For example, the presenter noted items to be considered including measurement systems, types of graphics and symbols, and types of media presentation tools. The author also pointed out significant differences that would affect communication among English languages including paper layouts, spelling, meaning, and use of humor. This important and practical information can be used by professionals working with technical translation.

Additionally, technical translation involves understanding how the Internet has influenced different cultures across the globe. Varying languages, cultural influences on Internet usage patterns, and media preferences force professionals in the field of technical communication to utilize a number of different strategies in order to effectively reach diverse populations across the globe. With international online populations the technical translator must be culturally diverse in a technological sense.

Finally, as technology makes intercultural and international communication easier, the technical translator must understand intercultural communication as it relates to ethics. Traditional models for ethical decision-making can be applied to difficult situations in technical translation, but the professional must avoid stereotyping and ethnocentrism in technical communication and translation.

== English as a lingua franca ==
=== English effect on translation ===
Technical translation is the medium through which language, discourse and communication can exist in a global world. As technology creates easier and faster means of communication and the world moves toward becoming a global community, the need to communicate with people from multiple language backgrounds also grows. Rather than working with multiple languages, some have proposed the idea of using English as the primary language for global communication, making English the lingua franca—or a common world language. However, English as a lingua franca has various implications for the field of technical communication. Particularly for technical translators who are native speakers of English, there is the tendency to assume a unilateral stance on translation. In other words, the technical translator's objective is to translate to and from English, with the English message being the main focus. While English is a language of global communication, it is not the only language being used for communication, highlighting the importance of moving away from "singular perspective" of only communicating in English. The concept of maintaining technical communication in languages other than English is of particular significance in countries with high volumes of multilingual speakers. For example, research has shown that the English-speaking bias, due to the language's position as the lingua franca, within technical translation and communication has negatively affected native Spanish speakers in the United States. Lacking both in quality and quantity, user manuals for various electronic devices exemplified sub-par translations into Spanish, demonstrating the limited accessibility of certain technical documents to speakers of languages other than English, perhaps partly as a result of English as the lingua franca. Finally, when discussing English as a lingua franca it is noteworthy to mention what some researchers call "untranslatable" words and what that means for technical translation. Such words or phrases are composed of concepts that are not easily translated from one language to another. A word is considered "untranslatable" when there is either no direct corresponding word in the target language, requiring the word to be described or when important cultural connotations from the source language are not properly communicated through the target word. For example, a common example in English of an untranslatable word is the German word "schadenfreude", which means to exhibit joy as a result of someone else's misfortune. This word exemplifies untranslatability due to the lack of a corresponding word; however words can be untranslatable due to a lack of a corresponding word, loss of cultural meaning, or for both reasons.

One study demonstrated that when faced with untranslatable words, technical translators resorted to avoidance tactics that evaded using the words altogether. The implications of untranslatable words and phrases suggest that the technical translation may not benefit from only utilizing English as a lingua franca, and rather, should focus efforts toward having more effective means of translating documents among multiple languages. It is notable that technical documentation contains multilingual lexical language, such as use of Latin and Greek terms in English such as "subdural hematoma" referring to "blood clot under the skull", drawing from Latin "sub", "duro", "hematoma"; and the use of Japanese in Chinese terms, e.g. "急性直腸炎開刀手術" in which "盲腸" "blind instestine" first appeared in Japanese as "蟲垂" "hanging worm".

== See also ==
- Tremédica
