= Sight translation =

Sight translation is the rendering of a written text in one language into spoken or signed output in another language. It is commonly performed in real time for immediate use by an audience. Because its input is written while its output is oral or signed, researchers describe it as a cross-modal activity and a hybrid of translation and interpreting. The terms sight interpreting and sight interpreting/translation are also used, particularly to emphasize the real-time nature of the task.

== Process and characteristics ==
In a sight-translation task, the practitioner reads a source text while producing its target-language version aloud or in sign language. The interpreter may be given time to inspect the document and research terminology, or may be required to begin with little or no preparation. Professional guidance recommends allowing the interpreter to skim the text, identify difficult terms and plan the reformulation of complex sentences before delivery when circumstances permit.

Sight translation differs from both written translation and the principal modes of interpreting. Unlike a written translator, the sight translator normally has limited time for revision and produces an ephemeral oral or signed text. Unlike an interpreter working in the simultaneous or consecutive mode, however, the practitioner receives the source message visually and can look ahead or return to an earlier part of the text. The continued visibility of the source can support content accuracy, but its wording and syntax can also interfere with fluent target-language production. Experimental research has found sight translation to be a distinct and cognitively demanding technique rather than merely a simplified form of interpreting.

== Professional use ==
Sight translation is used in legal, health-care and other public-service settings when participants need immediate access to a written document in a language they do not read. Examples include short court documents, discharge instructions, directions for medication and patient-specific information.

Professional organizations generally distinguish suitable short, relatively straightforward documents from texts that require a prepared written translation. The National Council on Interpreting in Health Care recommends strict limits on the length and complexity of documents used for sight translation. It considers specific patient-care instructions potentially suitable when the health-care provider is present to answer questions, but recommends professional written translation for legal documents such as consent forms. Australian guidance similarly advises against using unprepared sight translation for long, complex or technical legal and medical documents. These limits are intended to reduce inaccuracies and to avoid requiring the interpreter to explain or advise on the document's content rather than interpret it.

== Training and research ==
Sight translation is taught in interpreter-education programmes both as a professional skill and as preparation for consecutive and simultaneous interpreting. Training commonly develops rapid text analysis, terminology management, reading ahead, segmentation, reformulation, public speaking and self-monitoring. In health-care interpreter education, recommended practice materials include brief signs, discharge instructions and basic nutritional guidance, alongside discussion of how to decline or redirect requests involving lengthy or legalistic texts.

Research on sight translation has examined divided attention, working memory, eye movements, syntactic processing, source-language interference and differences between trainees and professional interpreters. A 2014 review described the practice as important in both professional work and interpreter training but noted that it remained under-researched compared with written translation and simultaneous and consecutive interpreting.

== See also ==
- Community interpreting
- Legal translation
- Medical translation
- Translation studies
