= Community interpreting =

Interpreting in public and community service settings

Community interpreting is a type of interpreting that enables people who do not share the language of a public or community service provider to communicate with that provider and gain access to its services. It is commonly used in healthcare, legal, educational, social-service, immigration, housing and local-government settings. The field includes both spoken-language and sign-language interpreting.

Unlike conference interpreting, which generally involves formal, largely one-directional communication at international or multilingual events, community interpreting usually takes place in dialogue-based encounters within a society. The participants may differ substantially in institutional authority, knowledge of procedures and social status.

== Terminology and scope ==
The terminology of the field varies among countries and professional traditions. Community interpreting is widely used in North America and in international scholarship, while public service interpreting is particularly common in the United Kingdom and parts of Europe. Other partly overlapping labels include dialogue interpreting, liaison interpreting and cultural interpreting.

Definitions also differ in their treatment of particular specializations. Healthcare and legal interpreting are frequently described as the two principal branches of community interpreting. In some jurisdictions, however, court interpreting and other forms of legal interpreting are regulated as distinct professions. The boundaries of the field therefore depend partly on national institutions, legislation and the degree to which interpreting services have become professionalized.

Community interpreting primarily serves members of linguistic minorities, including migrants, refugees, Indigenous peoples and deaf or hard-of-hearing people. It may also be required by travellers and other temporary users of public services. The service may be supplied by a public institution, private agency, non-governmental organization or independent interpreter.

== Settings ==
Major areas of community interpreting include:

- Healthcare interpreting, in hospitals, clinics, primary-care services, mental-health services and other therapeutic settings;
- Legal interpreting, in courts, police stations, prisons, immigration proceedings and consultations with legal professionals;
- Education interpreting, in communication among students, families, teachers and educational institutions;
- Social-service interpreting, including welfare, housing, child-protection and family services;
- Immigration and asylum interpreting, in interviews, reception services and administrative proceedings;
- Emergency and disaster interpreting, during natural disasters, public-health emergencies and other crises;
- Sign-language interpreting in public and community services.

The consequences of communication failure may be particularly serious in medical and legal settings, where interpreted interaction can affect diagnosis, consent, personal liberty or access to legal rights. These settings also involve specialized terminology, institutional procedures and rules of confidentiality.

== Modes and working methods ==
Community interpreting is often performed in the consecutive mode, with the interpreter rendering relatively short segments of dialogue. Other methods include simultaneous or whispered interpreting and sight translation of forms, instructions and short documents.

Interpreting may be provided face to face, by telephone or through video communication. ISO 13611:2024 sets out requirements and recommendations for community-interpreting services involving both spoken and signed languages and addresses service users, clients, interpreting-service providers and interpreters. The choice of delivery mode may depend on urgency, geographical access, availability of a particular language combination, confidentiality and the communication needs of the participants.

Professional practice generally encourages the primary participants to address one another directly. Interpreters commonly use the first person when rendering speech and disclose any intervention they make in the interaction. Seating or screen position, turn-taking and the management of overlapping speech can all affect the interpreted encounter.

== Interpreter-mediated interaction ==
Early descriptions of interpreting frequently treated the interpreter as a neutral conduit who transferred messages between languages. Research into face-to-face interpreted encounters has instead shown that interpreters participate in the organization and progression of the interaction as well as rendering its verbal content. Choices about turn-taking, requests for clarification and the handling of ambiguity can influence how an encounter develops.

Wadensjö distinguishes between the interpreter's function of relaying utterances and that of coordinating the interaction. This interactional perspective does not mean that interpreters are free to determine the outcome of an encounter. Rather, it draws attention to the practical decisions needed to maintain mutual understanding while preserving the participants' responsibility for what they say.

Community-interpreting encounters may include marked power asymmetries. A service provider generally possesses institutional knowledge and decision-making authority, while the service user may be unfamiliar with both the language and the procedures of the institution. The interpreter's role has therefore been debated in terms of neutrality, impartiality, cultural mediation and advocacy. Professional expectations differ across settings and jurisdictions, especially concerning when an interpreter should explain a cultural reference or intervene to prevent an apparent misunderstanding.

== Ethics ==
Codes of ethics for community interpreters commonly emphasize accuracy, confidentiality, impartiality, professional competence and clearly defined role boundaries. Accuracy generally requires the interpreter to convey the content and communicative effect of an utterance without unjustified additions, omissions or distortions. Confidentiality concerns information acquired during an assignment, subject to applicable law and institutional rules.

Impartiality requires interpreters to avoid allowing personal beliefs, interests or relationships to affect their rendition or professional conduct. It is related to, but not identical with, neutrality: interpreters inevitably help coordinate communication, even when they do not support either party's position. Ethical principles may come into tension in practice. For example, the need to reproduce an utterance accurately may conflict with a service provider's request that an interpreter simplify it, while confidentiality may be limited by mandatory-reporting laws.

Codes and standards may vary according to the setting. Healthcare, court and sign-language interpreting organizations often issue rules adapted to their own legal and professional environments. Consequently, general principles are applied alongside relevant legislation, institutional policy, and the requirements of the particular assignment.

== Competence and training ==
Professional community interpreting requires more than bilingual ability. Competence normally includes advanced proficiency in the working languages, interpreting techniques, knowledge of institutional procedures, subject-specific terminology, intercultural communication and ethical decision-making. Memory, note-taking, discourse analysis, stress management and the ability to recognize the limits of one's competence are also important.

Training may include role-play and simulated encounters drawn from healthcare, legal and social-service settings. Such exercises allow trainees to practise consecutive interpreting, sight translation, turn management, clarification procedures and ethical decision-making. Education for service providers on how to work effectively with interpreters is also regarded as part of an effective interpreting system.

Untrained bilingual relatives, friends, staff members or children are sometimes asked to interpret when professional services are unavailable. This practice is often described as ad hoc interpreting or natural interpreting. ISO 13611 distinguishes professional community interpreting from informal assistance by people without the required qualifications and competences.

== Professionalization and research ==
Although interpreting within multilingual communities has a long history, community interpreting developed as a distinct field of professional organization and academic research mainly during the late 20th century. Increased migration, recognition of minority-language rights and demands for equitable access to public services contributed to its growth.

The first international Critical Link conference was held in Orillia, Ontario, Canada, in June 1995. It brought together practitioners and researchers working in legal, healthcare, and social service settings and provided a forum for the emerging field. Revised papers presented at the conference were published in 1997 as The Critical Link: Interpreters in the Community.

Professionalization remains uneven across countries and specializations. Systems differ in interpreter education, certification, remuneration, access to qualified practitioners and legal recognition. The publication of ISO 13611 in 2014, followed by a revised edition in 2024, was one effort to establish internationally applicable requirements and recommendations for service quality.

Community-interpreting research draws on interpreting studies, applied linguistics, discourse analysis, sociology, law, and health communication research. Subjects of study include interpreter-mediated interaction, role expectations, institutional power, ethics, working conditions, remote interpreting, training and the experiences of service users.

== See also ==
- Consecutive interpreting
- Court interpreting
- Healthcare interpreting
- Language access
- Medical translation
- Sign-language interpreting
- Telephone interpreting
- Video remote interpreting
