= Translation-quality standards =

Like any supplier of goods or services, a translator potentially bears ethical and legal obligations toward their patron or employer. This has turned out to be of enormous importance with the development of the language industry at global scale. For the protection of both parties, standards have been developed that seek to spell out their mutual duties.

== History ==
Standards of quality and documentation were originally developed for manufacturing businesses. Codes for all types of services are now maintained by standardization organizations such as the International Organization for Standardization. Standards of this type include those of the ISO 9000 series.

As interest in quality management has grown, specific quality standards have been developed for translation services. These have included the Italian UNI 10574, the German DIN 2345, the Austrian Önorm D 1200 and Önorm D 1201, and the Canadian CAN CGSB 131.10.

In 2015, EN 15038 was replaced by ISO 17100:2015.

== EN 15038 ==
The European EN 15038 translation-services standard went into effect on August 1, 2006, replacing the previous standards of the 30 individual CEN member countries. It aims to unify the terminology used in the translation field, define basic requirements for language-service providers (human and technical resources, quality control, and project management) and create a framework for the interaction of customers and service providers in terms of their rights and obligations. It also defines certain services, in addition to translation, that may be offered by language-service providers.

A strong focus is on administrative, documentation, review and revision processes, as well as on the functions of different specialists who guide the translation project over its duration. Appendices to the standard provide information and suggestions on how best to comply with the standard.

== CAN CGSB 131.10-2008 ==
On May 12, 2009, the Language Industry Association of Canada, AILIA launched the latest standards certification program in the world. The certification is based on CAN/CGSB-131.10-2008, Translation Services, a national standard developed by the Canadian General Standards Board and approved by the Standards Council of Canada. It involved the participation of representatives from AILIA, professional associations, government, academia, purchasers of service, and other stakeholders.

The Canadian Standard for Translation Services CAN CGSB 131.10 - 2008 establishes and defines the requirements for the provision of translation services by translation service providers.

This National Standard of Canada is a modified adoption of the European Committee for Standardization (CEN) standard EN 15038 Translation Services. This document was prepared with the intent to harmonize where possible with the provisions of EN 15038 Translation Services. Variances in wording and content with EN 15038 reflect the Canadian perspective.

Conformity assessment and certification based on this standard are already in place. With the recent development of national and regional standards for translation services, many translation service providers, nationally and internationally, are now in the process of either considering or seeking certification of the services they provide in meeting the demands of the marketplace.

The standard specifies the requirements for the provision of translation services by the translation service provider (TSP).

There are three key points common to all standards:

- Select your human resources with care.
- Come to an agreement on your project specifications before translation begins.
- Follow the specifications at every step of the project.

The CGSB 131.10 discuss the following:

- Scope
- Definitions
- Human Resources
- Technical Resources
- Quality Management System
- Client-TSP Relationship
- TSP Project Management Procedures
- Translation Process
- Notes
- Appendixes:
  - A. Project Recording
  - B. Pre-Translation Processing
  - C. Additional Services

The standard does not apply to interpreting or terminology services.

TSPs interested in getting certified can review the AILIA Certification Preparation Guide

The AILIA Translation Committee takes care of the promotion of the Canadian Translation Standard and its certification.

== ASTM F2575-06 ==
The American translation-services standard is the ASTM F2575-06 Standard Guide for Quality Assurance in Translation. It provides a framework for customers and translation-service providers desirous of agreeing on the specific requirements of a translation project. It does not provide specific criteria for translation or project quality, as these requirements may be highly individual, but states parameters that should be considered before beginning a translation project. As the document's name suggests, it is a guideline, informing stakeholders about what basic quality requirements are in need of compliance, rather than a prescriptive set of detail instructions for the translator.

== Criticism: over-dependence on standards ==
There is, however, a view within the translation industry that, while not doing any actual harm, an over-reliance on such standards can give a false sense of security. Blindly following translation standards does not on its own provide real assurance regarding translation quality. The argument is that the path to quality in translation is by focusing more on providing on-going training and feedback to translators.

== See also ==
- Translation
- EN 15038
- Medical translation
- Translation project
- Translation criticism
