= A Girl like Me (film) =

A Girl Like Me
- Directed by: Kiri Davis
- Release date: June 1, 2005
- Running time: 7 minutes
- Country: United States
- Language: English

A Girl like Me is a 2005 documentary by Kiri Davis. The seven-minute documentary examines such things as the importance of color, hair and facial features for young African American women. It won the Diversity Award at the 6th Annual Media That Matters film festival in New York City, and has received coverage on various American media sources, such as CNN, ABC, NPR. The documentary has been shown on HBO. The documentary was made as part of Reel Works Teen Filmmaking.

== Synopsis ==
The video begins with interviews with Kiri Davis and her peers about how black features did not conform to society's standards of beauty. The next section was a repeat of an experiment conducted by Kenneth Clark in the 1940s where African-American children were asked to choose between black or white dolls. In the original experiment(s) the majority of the children choose the white dolls. When Davis repeated the experiment 15 out of 21 children also choose the white dolls over the black, giving similar reasons as the original subjects, associating white with being pretty or good and black with ugly or bad. The dolls used in the documentary were identical except for skin colour.

== Awards ==
- The Diversity Award at the 6th Annual Media That Matters film festival
- The SILVERDOCS Audience Award for a Short Documentary.

== Screenings ==
- Tribeca Film Festival
- The 6th Annual Media That Matters.
- Silverdocs: AFI/Discovery Channel Documentary Festival
- HBO
