= Content editing =

Form of copy editing

Content editing, also known as substantive editing, comprehensive editing, macro editing, or heavy editing, is a form of copy editing that evaluates the document's format, style, and content to optimize visual design and comprehensibility. Comprehensive editors are a type of language professional.

== General features ==
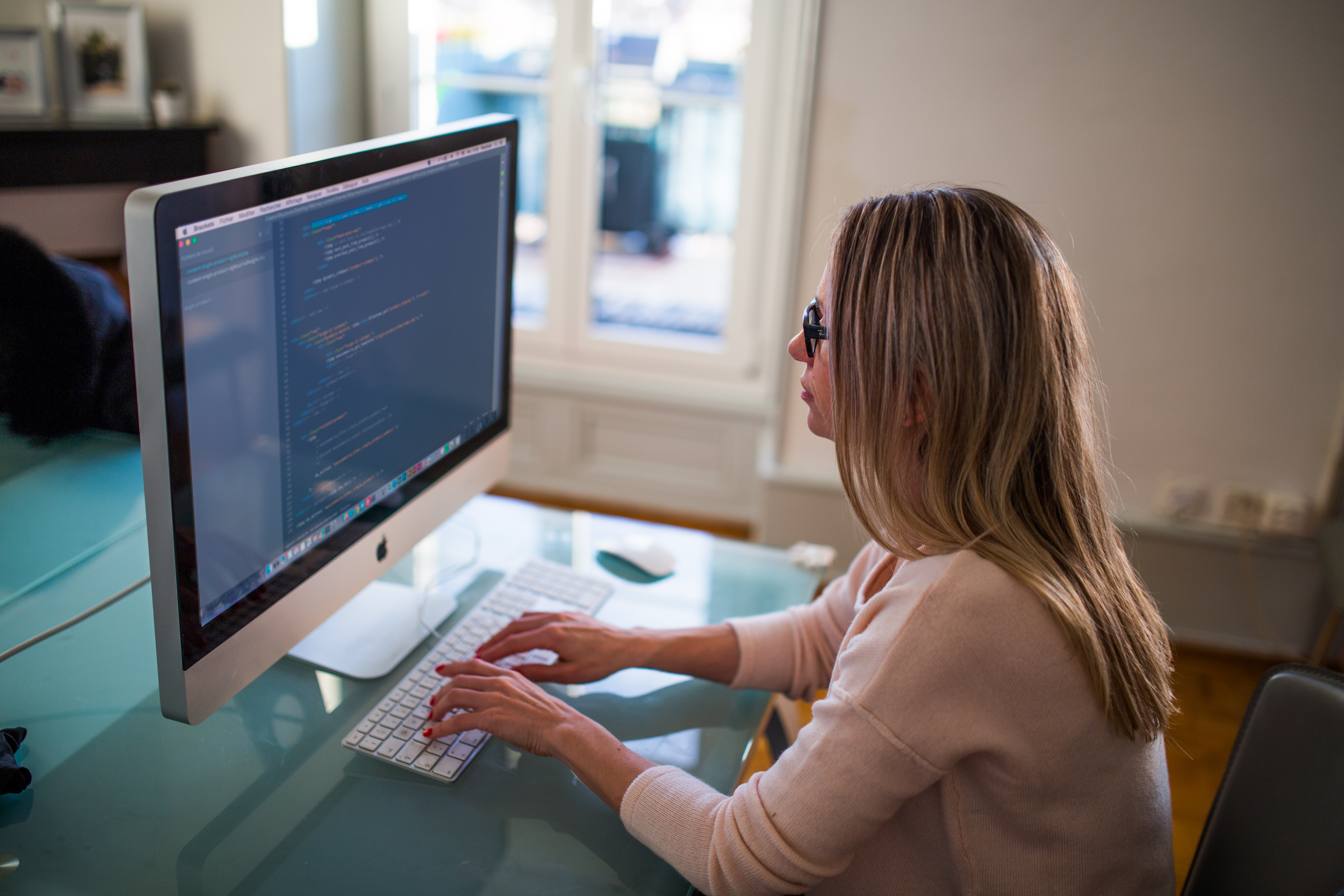
Comprehensive editing being displayed in the workforce.

Content editing does not typically involve the use of a handbook, guide, or manual, and instead, focuses on what will make the substance of the text more understandable based on the subjective assessment of the editor. The process often requires changes based on rhetorical questions related to improvements in understanding and functionality. Content editing focuses on the general conceptual intent, content, organization, and writing style of the text in consideration. Within content editing, different levels and types of edits can be classified based on systematic methods. These methods can be used in the management of companies and organizations to ensure they have a structured way of editing for their editors.

Content editing can require effort beyond that of basic copy editing, and in particular demands editorial judgment because guidelines are often less strict. The objective of precise editing is to reach certainty that each manual is thoroughly developed, well-structured, and written in an engaging manner with utmost accuracy. It can be time-consuming because it requires the entire document to be conceptually deconstructed, broader than that of specific diction or syntax. Such deconstruction could mean reorganizing sections or restructuring the document as a whole.

Content edits not only allow an improvement in readability but also visual appeal. Effective content editing can allow a confusing document to be clearer, more precise, and easier to read. Tables, graphs, and placement of images can be components of effective content editing.

== Complications ==
Unlike copy editing, which usually involves a set of rules, content editing has less strict guidelines, beyond the general requirement that the changes made result in better readability. Content editing anticipates the reader's needs, creating a challenge as subtle changes to content require an understanding of the intended audience. Also, complications may appear if the content is edited by the writer themselves and they may not see their own mistakes. Thus, in such cases, editing tools are used to ensure the writing is error-free.
