= Social edition =

A social edition is a form of textual scholarship that utilizes social media like Wikimedia or blogs to create annotated editions of texts. Crompton, Arbuckle and Siemens describe that "Using social media allows us to integrate a new stage into the editorial process — a stage that fills the gap between an edition’s initial planning stages and its concluding blind peer review, which capitalizes on the engaged knowledge communities inside and outside the academy".

== List of social editions ==
=== Open participation ===
Participation is open to registered and unregistered contributors.

- The Annotated The Tales of John Oliver Hobbes
- A Social Edition of the Devonshire MS

=== Semi-open participation ===
Participation is allowed through a process of review by the project members.

- The Iraq Study Group Report
