= EN 15038 =

EN 15038 is a withdrawn quality standard developed especially for translation services providers. The EN 15038 standard ensured the consistent quality of the service. In 2015, CEN withdrew EN 15038 and adopted ISO 17100 as a European standard.

Many European translation companies have long felt the need for a reliable method of demonstrating the quality of the services they provide to their customers. Many sought ISO 9001 certification as a demonstration of their commitment to quality management systems. However, as the ISO 9001 standard does not address the sort of translation-specific processes which many translators consider important in determining quality outcomes, this standard did not become widely accepted as a "guarantee of quality" in the industry. In 2006, a quality standard, specifically written for the translation industry, EN 15038, was published by CEN, the European Committee for Standardization. This was a serious attempt to provide certification of translation-specific quality management using independent, on-site audits by recognized certification bodies. This standard is gaining acceptance worldwide and the European Union has begun including it as a benchmark in its tender specifications.

== Background ==
There have been a number of initiatives in Europe to create a universal quality standard that could benchmark the quality of the translation services and gain recognition through independent audit certification. This includes the Italian UNI 10574 Standard, the Austrian Önorm D 1200 and Önorm D 1201 Standards, the Dutch Taalmerk Standard and the German DIN 2345 Standard. In 1999 the EUATC (European Union of Associations of Translation Companies) saw the need to develop an industry specific quality standard. This initiative built on previous standards which had been established by some national associations of translation companies. This standard was the first European wide initiative. In 2003 the EUATC took this standard to the next level. They started working with CEN, the European standards body, in April 2003 with the aim of creating a certifiable quality process standard for translation. The public consultation period started in September 2004 and EN 15038 was published by May 2006. The EUATC is made up of national associations of translation companies throughout Europe and these national associations have been translating the standard into their own language and cooperating with their national standardisation bodies for publication and certification by independent third party auditors.

== Scope and definitions ==
An area not covered by EN 15038 is the interpreting and service matrix. While the committee developing the standard recognised the value of including Interpretation within the scope of the standard, it was felt that managing interpreting quality would make developing the standard more difficult and it would extend the process.

Within the translation industry many words are used to describe different processes from one company to another. It is very important for anyone who intends to implement EN 15038 that they understand the meaning of the terms and definitions used in the standard. The standard also uses the terms ‘should’ and ‘shall’. When the word ‘shall’ is used, it is obligatory while ‘should’ is used for recommended.

The following are some of the terms which are defined in the standard:

- Translation Service Provider (TSP) – An organisation or person who supplies translation services. Also known as Language Service Provider (LSP).
- Added value service – Services which can be provided by a TSP in addition to translation.
- Competence – Demonstrated ability to apply knowledge and skill
- Interpreting – Rendering of spoken information in the source language into the target language in spoken form.
- Translation – Rendering of written text in the source language into the target language.
- Translator – Person who translates.
- Source text – The original text. The text which is being translated.
- Target text – The translated text.
- Locale – The linguistic, cultural, technical and geographical conventions of the target audience
- Revise – Examine a translation for its suitability for the agreed purpose, compare the source and target texts, and recommend corrective measures.
- Reviser – Person who revises.
- Review – Examine a target text for its suitability for the agreed purpose and respect for the conventions of the domain to which it belongs and recommend corrective measures.
- Reviewer – Person who reviews.
- Proofreading – Checking of proofs before publication.

== Main provisions ==
The EN 15038 standard set out the:

- Basic requirements for the human resources and process used in the provision of translation services
- Client – TSP relationship
- Procedures for translation services

The appendices provide additional information on project registration, technical pre-translation process, source text analysis, style guides and a non exhaustive list of added value services.

=== Basic requirements for the human resources and process used ===
This section outlines the level of competence required by translators and others working on the project, the need for the right technology and communication equipment and the need for a documented quality management system.

=== Client – TSP relation ===
The standard sets out steps in the Client – TSP relationship. These include:

- Enquiry & feasibility
- Quotation
- Client – TSP agreement
- Handling of project related client information
- Project conclusion

=== Procedures in translation services ===
This section of the standard is divided in three subsections which deal with Project Management, Preparation and Translation.

The standard states the TSP shall have documented procedures in place for handling translation projects, contact with the client, quality assurance and compliance with the client – TSP agreement.

The sub-section on preparation deals with project registration, project assignment, technical resources, pre-translating process, source text analysis, terminology work and the style guide.

The standard specifies the following steps in the translation process: translation, checking, revision, review, proofreading and final verification.

=== Added value services ===
If a TSP offers any added value services, it should make every effort to apply the same level of quality to those services as to the services covered by the standard.

== National standards ==
EN 15038 was published as a national standards by all CEN members.

== EN 15038 and ISO 9001 ==
The EN 15038 standard not only introduced requirements for compliance with certain common procedures, as is the case with ISO 9001, but also monitors the processes especially developed for the overall execution of the translation – from acceptance of the order to delivery. Also, EN 15038 certified the translation service and not the process management, as is the case with ISO 9001.

== See also ==
- Language industry
- Translation
- Translation criticism
- Translation project
- Translation-quality standards
