= Kenneth and Mamie Clark =

African-American married psychologist duo

Kenneth Clark
- Born: Kenneth Bancroft Clark; July 24, 1914; Panama Canal Zone
- Died: May 1, 2005 (aged 90); Hastings-on-Hudson, New York, U.S.
- Education: Howard University
- Occupations: Psychologist, educator, professor, author
- Spouse: Mamie Clark
- Children: 2
- Parent(s): Arthur Bancroft Clark; Miriam Hanson Clark

Mamie Clark
- Born: Mamie Phipps Clark; April 18, 1917; Hot Springs, Arkansas, U.S.
- Died: August 11, 1983 (aged 66); Hastings-on-Hudson, New York, U.S.
- Education: Howard University
- Occupation: Psychologist
- Spouse: Kenneth Clark
- Children: 2
- Parent(s): Harold Phipps; Katie Phipps
- Relatives: Harold Phipps (brother)

Kenneth Bancroft Clark (July 24, 1914 – May 1, 2005) and Mamie Phipps Clark (April 18, 1917 – August 11, 1983) were American psychologists who as a married team conducted research among children and were active in the Civil Rights Movement. They founded the Northside Center for Child Development in Harlem and the organization Harlem Youth Opportunities Unlimited (HARYOU). Kenneth Clark was also an educator and professor at City College of New York, and first Black president of the American Psychological Association.

They were known for their 1940s experiments using dolls to study children's attitudes about race. The Clarks testified as expert witnesses in Briggs v. Elliott (1952), one of five cases combined into Brown v. Board of Education (1954). The Clarks' work contributed to the ruling of the U.S. Supreme Court in which it determined that de jure racial segregation in public education was unconstitutional. Chief Justice Earl Warren wrote in the Brown v. Board of Education opinion, "To separate them from others of similar age and qualifications solely because of their race generates a feeling of inferiority as to their status in the community that may affect their hearts and minds in a way unlikely to ever be undone."

== Mamie Phipps Clark ==
=== Early life ===
The oldest of three children, two girls and one boy, Mamie Phipps was born in Hot Springs, Arkansas, to Harold and Katie Phipps. Her father was a doctor, a native of the British West Indies. Her father also supplemented his income as a manager at a nearby vacation resort. Her mother helped him in his practice and encouraged both their children in education. Her brother became a dentist. Even though Phipps Clark grew up during the Depression and a time of racism and segregation, she had a privileged childhood. Her father's occupation and income allowed them to live a middle-class lifestyle and even got them into some White-only parts of town. Phipps Clark, however, still attended segregated elementary and secondary schools, graduating from Pine Bluff's Langston High School in 1934 at only 16 years old. This upbringing gave her a unique perspective on how society treated White and Black people differently. This realization contributed to her future research of racial identity in Black children. Despite the small number of opportunities for Black students to pursue higher education, Phipps Clark was offered several scholarships for college. Phipps Clark received scholarship offers from two of the most prestigious Black universities at that time, Fisk University in Tennessee and Howard University in Washington D.C.

Francis Sumner allowed her to work part-time in the psychology department where she expanded her knowledge about psychology. During her senior year in 1937 Kenneth, another mentee of Sumner's, and Mamie Clark got married; they had to elope because her mother did not want her to get married before she graduated. A year later, she earned her B.A. magna cum laude in psychology (1938). Both Kenneth and Mamie went on for additional study at Columbia University. They later had two children together, Katie Miriam and Hilton Bancroft.

In the fall of 1938 Mamie Clark went to graduate school at Howard University to get a master's degree in psychology and while she was enrolled her father would send her an allowance of fifty dollars a month. The summer following her undergraduate graduation Mamie worked for Charles Houston as a secretary at his law office. At the time, Houston was a popular civil rights lawyer and Mamie was privileged to see lawyers such as Thurgood Marshall come into the office to work on important cases. She admits that she did not think anything could be done about segregation and racial oppression until after this experience. Believing in a tangible end to segregation inspired Phipps Clark's future studies, the results of which would help lawyers, such as Houston and Marshall, to win the Brown v. Board of Education Supreme Court case in 1954.

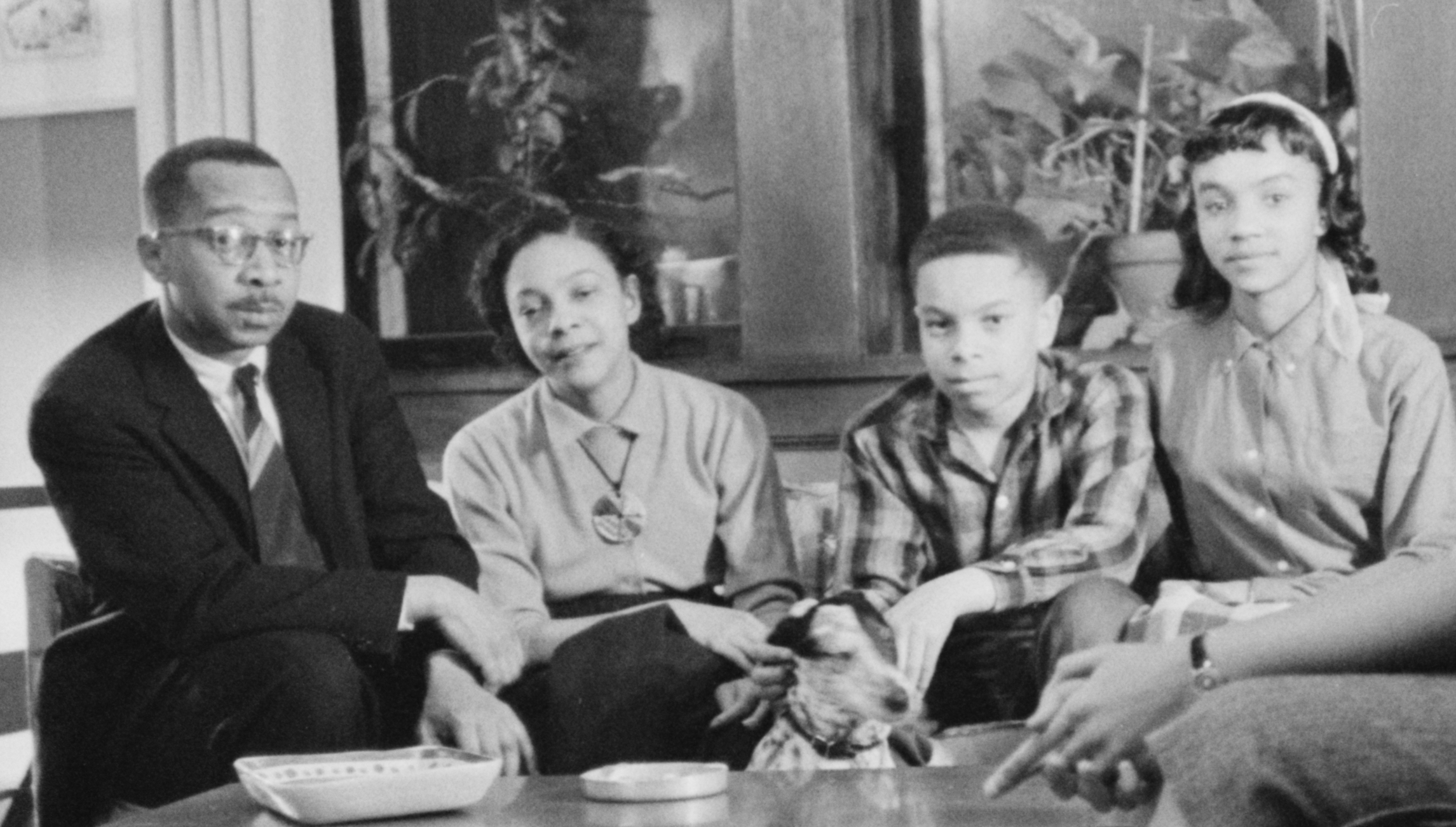
Kenneth and Mamie Clark with their children, 1958

While working on her master's degree, Phipps Clark became increasingly interested in developmental psychology. The inspiration for her thesis came from working at an all Black nursery school. She contacted psychologists Ruth and Gene Horowitz for advice. At the time they were conducting psychological studies about self-identification in young children and suggested that she conduct similar research with her nursery school children. Her master's thesis was entitled "The Development of Consciousness of Self in Negro Pre-School Children." This thesis was the basis from what would later become the Clarks' famous doll study on racial preference. Her husband Kenneth was fascinated by her thesis research and after her graduation they worked together on the research. They developed new and improved versions of the color and doll tests used in her thesis for a proposal to further the research. In 1940 they received a three-year Rosenwald Fellowship for their research that allowed them to publish three articles on the subject and also permitted Phipps Clark to pursue a doctoral degree at Columbia University.

During her time at Columbia, Mamie was the only black student pursuing a doctorate in psychology and she had a faculty adviser, Dr. Henry Garrett, who believed in segregation. Despite their differences in beliefs, Phipps Clark was able to complete her dissertation, "Changes in Primary Mental Abilities with Age." In 1943, Mamie Phipps Clark was the first African-American woman to earn a Ph.D. in psychology from Columbia University. She was the second Black person to receive a doctorate in psychology from Columbia University, following her husband Kenneth.

=== Career ===
After Phipps Clark graduated, she struggled being a psychologist as an African-American woman living in New York. She found it difficult to get a job; she lost some opportunities to less qualified White men and women. In the summer of 1939, Mamie took one of her first jobs as a secretary in the legal office of African-American lawyer Charles Hamilton Houston. This law firm involved the planning of legal action that would challenge the segregation laws. In 1944, she found a job through a family friend at the American Public Health Association analyzing research about nurses, which she hated. She stayed at that job for one year but was grossly overqualified for the position, which she found embarrassing. She then obtained a position at the United States Armed Forces Institute as a research psychologist but she still felt pigeonholed. In 1945 she was able to get a better job working for the United States Armed Forces Institute as a research psychologist; but, as World War II ended they did not feel the need to employ her anymore. She was fired in 1946. Later that year, Phipps Clark got a job in New York at the Riverdale Children's Association where she saw potential to perform meaningful work. Founded by Quakers in 1836 as the Colored Orphan Asylum, in 1944, just two years before Dr. Clark arrived, the then 108 year old institution had changed its name. At Riverdale, she conducted psychological tests and counseled young, homeless Black people. While there, she saw first hand how insufficient psychological services were for minority children. Many of the children were being called intellectually disabled by the state but Clark tested them and found they had IQs above then accepted levels for such claims. She saw society's segregation as the cause for gang warfare, poverty, and low academic performance of minorities. This was a "kick start" to her life's work and led to her most significant contributions in the field of developmental psychology.

Kenneth and Mamie Clark decided to try to improve social services for troubled youth in Harlem as there were virtually no mental-health services in the community. Kenneth Clark was then an assistant professor at the City College of New York and Phipps Clark was a psychological consultant doing testing at the Riverdale Children's Association. Kenneth Bancroft Clark and Mamie Phipps Clark approached social service agencies in New York City urging them to expand their programs to provide social work, psychological evaluation, and remediation for youth in Harlem. None of the agencies took up their proposal. The Clarks "realized that we were not going to get a child guidance clinic opened that way. So we decided to open it ourselves."

Together in 1946 the Clarks created the Northside Center for Child Development, originally called the Northside Testing and Consultation Center. They started in a one-room basement apartment of the Dunbar Houses on 158th Street (Manhattan). Two years later in 1948, Northside moved to 110th Street, across from Central Park, on the sixth floor of what was then the New Lincoln School. In 1974, Northside moved to Schomburg Plaza. As of 2023, Northside continues to serve Harlem children and their families from its center at the intersection of E. 108th Street and Park Avenue, New York.

The Clark's goal was to match or surpass for poor African Americans, the mental health services then available for other children. Northside provided a homelike environment for poor Black children that provided pediatric and psychological help. It served as a location for initial experiments on racial biases in education and the intersection of education and varying theories and practices around social psychology. The psychological work they did led them to the conclusion that the problems of minority children are "neither purely psychiatric, purely social, nor purely environmental, but psychosocial." Northside was the first center that offered psychological services to minority families around Harlem.

Mamie remained the director of the Northside Center for 33 years. Upon her retirement, Dora Johnson, a staff member at Northside, captured the importance of Mamie Clark to Northside. "Mamie Clark embodied the center. In a very real way, it was her views, philosophy, and her soul that held the center together". She went on to say that "when an unusual and unique person pursues a dream and realizes that dream and directs that dream, people are drawn not only to the idea of the dream, but to the uniqueness of the person themselves." Her vision of social, economic, and psychological advancement of African-American children resonates far beyond the era of integration.

Phipps Clark did not limit her contributions to her Northside work. She was a very involved member of the community. She was on the boards of directors for several community organizations, along with being involved with the Youth Opportunities Unlimited Project and the initiation of the Head Start Program. She also volunteered in the psychiatric clinic of the Domestic Relations Court while she was completing her doctorate at Columbia and went on to teach at Yeshiva University.

=== Published work ===
One of Phipps Clark's early, published studies was titled The Development of Consciousness of Self and the Emergence of Racial Identification in Negro Preschool Children. This research was an investigation of early level of conscious racial identity in Black preschool children. The study included 150 Black children from segregated, nursery schools in Washington, D.C. with 50% of the participants being girls and 50% boys. There were 50 three-year-old, 50 four-year-old, and 50 five-year-old children in the study. Each participant was shown a set of pictures that included a white boy, a black boy, a lion, a dog, a clown, and a hen. The participants were asked to point to the drawing that represented who or what they were asked about. An example of this procedure would be a Black boy being asked to point to his cousin or brother. The results showed that the group tended to choose the drawing with a black child over the white child but as age increased, there was still some increase in the ratio of those identifying with black over white. Their finding indicated that a great amount of self-conscious development and racial identity happens between ages three and fours years old. Once past four years old, this identification with the Black boy plateaus. This plateau may imply that the picture study is not sensitive enough for children over four. It also suggests that maybe five-year-old children have reached a self-awareness and now see themselves in an intrinsic way and are less capable of external representations.

=== Legacy ===
Phipps Clark's work provided key contributions to the fields of developmental psychology and the psychology of race by shedding light on the impact of racial discrimination. She made lasting contributions at the United States Armed Forces Institute and the Public Health Association. Her unrelenting research on the identity and self-esteem of Black people expanded work on identity development.

Clark is not as famous as her husband. It has been noted that she adhered to feminine expectations of the time and often took care to "remain in the shadows of her husband's limelight". She often presented as shy. It should also be noted, that Phipps Clark's tendency to remain in her husband's shadow occurred in the backdrop of blatant sexism and racism in the psychological field and it is believed that the extent of her contributions was significantly downplayed.

Together, the Clarks devoted their entire lives to improving the mental health of Black people. For her contributions, Phipps Clark received a Candace Award for Humanitarianism from the National Coalition of 100 Black Women in 1983.

Phipps Clark retired in 1979 and died of lung cancer on August 11, 1983, at 66 years old at her home in Hastings-on-Hudson, New York. In addition to her husband, Phipps Clark was survived by her daughter, Kate Harris of Hastings-on-Hudson; her son, Hilton, of Manhattan, and her brother, Harold Phipps of Pine Bluff, Arkansas.

== Kenneth Clark ==
=== Early life and education ===
Kenneth Clark was born on July 24, 1914 in the Panama Canal Zone to Arthur Bancroft Clark and Miriam Hanson Clark. His father worked as an agent for the United Fruit Company. When he was five, his parents separated and his mother took him and his younger sister Beulah to the US to live in Harlem in New York City. Miriam Clark worked as a seamstress in a sweatshop, where she later organized a union and became a shop steward for the International Ladies Garment Workers Union. Kenneth Clark arrived in New York City as the ethnic diversity of Harlem was disappearing, such that his elementary school was predominantly black. Clark noted that he first "became aware of color" when he was taught by a black teacher, who happened to be Hubert Thomas Delaney. Clark was to be trained to learn a trade, as were most black students at the time. Miriam wanted more for her son and transferred him to George Washington High School in Upper Manhattan. Clark graduated from high school in 1931 (Jones & Pettigrew, 2005).

Clark attended Howard University, a historically black university, where he first studied political science with professors including Ralph Johnson Bunche. During his years at Howard University, he worked under the influence of mentor Francis Cecil Sumner, the first African American to receive a doctorate in psychology. He returned in 1935 for a master's in psychology. Clark was a distinguished member of Kappa Alpha Psi fraternity. After earning his master's degree, Sumner directed Clark to Columbia University to work with another influential mentor, Otto Klineberg (Jones & Pettigrew, 2005).

While studying psychology for his doctorate at Columbia, Clark did research in support of the study of race relations by Swedish economist Gunnar Myrdal, who wrote An American Dilemma. In 1940, Clark was the first African American to earn a Ph.D. in psychology from Columbia University.

=== Career ===
During the summer of 1941, after Clark was already asked to teach a summer session at City College of New York, the Dean of Hampton Institute in Virginia asked Clark to start a department of psychology there. In 1942 Kenneth Clark would become the first African-American tenured, full professor at the City College of New York. Clark also managed to start a psychology department at Hampton Institute in 1942 and taught a few courses within the department. In 1966 he was the first African American appointed to the New York State Board of Regents and the first African American to be president of the American Psychological Association.

Much of Clark's work came as a response to his involvement in the 1954 Brown v. Board of Education US Supreme Court desegregation decision. Lawyers Jack Greenberg and Robert L. Carter, with resources and funding from the American Jewish Committee (AJC) and Topeka Jewish Community Relations Bureau, hired Clark to present his work on the effects of segregation on children. After the Brown v. Board of Education case, Clark was still dissatisfied by the lack of progress in school desegregation in New York City. In a 1964 interview with Robert Penn Warren for the book Who Speaks for the Negro?, Clark expressed his doubts about the efficacy of certain busing programs in desegregating the public schools. Clark also felt very discouraged by the lack of social welfare organizations to address race and poverty issues. He criticized newly developing forms of racial segregation and ghettoization as a form of "internal colonialism" (Freeman 2008). He argued that a new approach had to be developed to involve poor blacks, in order to gain the political and economic power needed to solve their problems.

In 1962, Clark was among the founders of Harlem Youth Opportunities Unlimited (HARYOU), an organization devoted to developing educational and job opportunities. With HARYOU, Clark conducted an extensive sociological study of Harlem. He measured IQ scores, crime frequency, age frequency of the population, drop-out rates, church and school locations, quality of housing, family incomes, drugs, STD rates, homicides, and a number of other areas. It recruited educational experts to help to reorganize Harlem schools, create preschool classes, tutor older students after school, and job opportunities for youth who dropped out. Clark hoped that the Kennedy-Johnson administration's War on Poverty would address problems of increasing social isolation, economic dependence and declining municipal services for many African Americans. The Johnson administration earmarked more than $100 million for the organization. When it was placed under the administration of a pet project of Congressman Adam Clayton Powell Jr. in 1964, the two men clashed over appointment of a director and its direction.

Clark used HARYOU to press for changes to the educational system in order to help improve black children's performance. While he initially supported decentralization of city schools, after a decade of experience, Clark believed that this option had not been able to make an appreciable difference and described the experiment as a "disaster".

Following race riots in the summer of 1967, U.S. President Lyndon Johnson appointed the National Advisory Commission on Civil Disorders (Kerner Commission). The Commission called Clark among the first experts to testify on urban issues. In 1973, Clark testified in the trial of Ruchell Magee for his role in the Marin County Civic Center attacks.

Clark retired from City College in 1975 but remained an active advocate for integration throughout his life, serving on the board of the New York Civil Rights Coalition, of which he was Chairman Emeritus until his death. He opposed separatists and argued for high standards in education, continuing to work for children's benefit. He consulted to city school systems across the country and argued that all children should learn to use Standard English in school.

Clark died in Hastings-on-Hudson, New York on May 1, 2005. He was 90.

=== Books ===
- Prejudice and Your Child (1955)
- Dark Ghetto (1965)
- The Negro and the American Promise (1963)
- A Relevant War Against Poverty (1968), co-written with Jeannette Hopkins
- A Possible Reality (1972)
- Pathos of Power (1975)
- King, Malcolm, Baldwin: Three Interviews (1985)

== The Coloring Test ==
The coloring test was another experiment that was involved in the Brown v. Board of Education decision. Mamie and Kenneth did this experiment in order to investigate the development of racial identity in African American children and examine how a negro child’s color and "their sense of their own race and status" influenced "their judgment about themselves" and their "self esteem." The coloring test was administered to 160 African American children between the ages of five and seven years old. The children were given a piece of coloring paper with a leaf, an apple, an orange, a mouse, a boy and a girl on it. They were all given a box of crayons and asked to first color the mouse to make sure they had a basic understanding of the relationship between color and object. If they pass, they were then asked to color a boy if they were a boy and a girl if they were a girl. They were told to color the boy or girl the color that they are. They were then told to color the opposite sex the color that they want that sex to be. The Clarks categorized the responses into reality responses (accurately colored their skin color), fantasy responses (very different from their skin color), and irrelevant responses (used bizarre colors like purple or green). The Clarks examined the reality and fantasy responses to conclude that children typically color themselves noticeably lighter than their actual color, while the fantasy responses reflect children trying through wishful thinking to escape their situation. Although 88% of the children did draw themselves brown or black, they oftentimes drew themselves a lighter shade than the mouse. Children that were older generally were more accurate at determining how dark they should be. When asked to color the picture of the child that was the opposite sex, 52% put either white or an irrelevant color.

== Doll experiments ==
The Clarks' doll experiments grew out of Mamie Clark's master's degree thesis. They published three major papers between 1939 and 1940 on children's self-perception related to race. Their studies found contrasts among African-American children attending segregated schools in Washington, DC versus those in integrated schools in New York. The doll experiment involved a child being presented with two dolls. Both of these dolls were completely identical except for the skin and hair color. One doll was white with yellow hair, while the other was brown with black hair. The child was then asked questions inquiring as to which one is the doll they would play with, which one is the nice doll, which one looks bad, which one has the nicer color, etc. The experiment showed a clear preference for the white doll among all children in the study. One of the conclusions from the study is that a Black child by the age of five is aware that to be "colored in American society is a mark of inferior status". This study was titled, "Emotional Factors in Racial Identification and Preference in Negro Children", and was not created with public policy or the Supreme Court in mind, lending credibility to its objectiveness. The study was published only in the Journal of Negro Education before appearing before the Court. These findings exposed internalized racism in African-American children, self-hatred that was more acute among children attending segregated schools. This research also paved the way for an increase in psychological research into areas of self-esteem and self-concept.

This work suggests that by its very nature, segregation harms children and, by extension, society at large, a suggestion that was exploited in several legal battles. The Clarks testified as expert witnesses in several school desegregation cases, including Briggs v. Elliott, which was later combined into the famous Brown v. Board of Education (1954). In 1954, Clark and Isidor Chein wrote a brief whose purpose was to supply evidence in the Brown v. Board of Education case underlining the damaging effects racial segregation had on African-American children. Brown v. Board was a test case supported by the NAACP to end the precedent of legal segregation when conditions are "separate but equal," established by the case Plessy v. Ferguson in 1896. In a 9–0 decision for Brown, the Court decided that segregation based on race in public schools violates the Equal Protection Clause of the Fourteenth Amendment.

The Supreme Court declared that separate but equal in education was unconstitutional because it resulted in African American children having "a feeling of inferiority as to their status in the community." The Doll Study is cited in the 11th footnote of the Brown decision to provide updated and "ample" psychological support to the Kansas case. The Brown decision quotes that, "segregation of white and colored children in public schools has detrimental effect upon the colored children" and this sense of inferiority "affects the motivation of a child to learn." The evidence provided by Clark helped end segregation in the public school systems. Regarding Brown, this question of psychological and psychic harm fit into a very particular historical window that allowed it to have formal traction in the first place. It was not until a few decades prior (with the coming of Boas and other cultural anthropologists) that cultural and social-science research—and the questions that they invoked—would even be consulted by the courts and therefore able to influence decisions.

=== Response to Doll tests ===
Not everyone accepted the Doll tests as valid scientific studies. Henry E. Garrett, Mamie Clark’s former professor and advisor at Columbia, was an avid supporter of segregation and a witness in Davis v. County School Board of Prince Edward County, VA (one of the five court cases that combined to form Brown v. Board). Garrett argued that no tests could adequately gauge a student’s attitudes toward segregation, and that the Clarks’ tests in Virginia were biased and had too small of a sample size. Garrett advocated in his Virginia school board testimony that if a negro child had access to equal facilities surrounded by his own teachers and friends, "he would be more likely to develop pride in himself as a Negro, which I think we would all like to see him do – to develop his own potential, his sense of duty…" and Garrett even claimed that they would "prefer to remain as a Negro group" instead of mixing and facing hostility, animosity, and inferiority. Garrett and his colleague Wesley C. George’s 1964 letter to the Science journal further questioned the Brown decision, claiming the only reference to science in the entire decision is in footnote 11. Garrett and George argue that the Court overlooked the "mental difference" between races, and that Clark’s evidence was invalid and misleading because "integration, not segregation, injured the Negro child’s self-image." In an alternative interpretation of the Clark doll experiments, Robin Bernstein has recently argued that the children's rejection of the black dolls could be understood not as victimization or an expression of internalized racism but instead as resistance against violent play involving black dolls, which was a common practice when the Clarks conducted their tests. Historian Daryl Scott also critiqued the logic of the Doll Study, because contemporary studies suggest that black children with greater contact with whites experience more psychological distress. The Clark Doll Study was influential scientific evidence for the Brown v. Board decision, but a few academics questioned the study.

In 2005, filmmaker Kiri Davis recreated the doll study and documented it in a film entitled A Girl Like Me. Despite the many changes in some parts of society, Davis found the same results as did the Drs. Clark in their study of the late 1930s and early 1940s. In the original experiments, the majority of the children chose the white dolls. When Davis repeated the experiment 15 out of 21 children also chose the white dolls over the black doll.

CNN recreated the doll study in 2010 with cartoons of five children, each with different shades of skin color. The experiment was designed by Margaret Beale Spencer, a child psychologist and University of Chicago professor. Children were asked to answer the same doll test questions, such as "who is the nice child" or "who has the skin color most adults like" and choose between the cartoon people arranged in order of lightest to darkest skin. The results were interpreted as indicating "white bias," meaning that children (mostly white, but also "black children as a whole have some bias") continue to associate positive attributes with lighter skin tones, and negative attributes with darker skin tones.

== Family ==
The Clarks had two children: a son Hilton and daughter Kate. During the Columbia University protests of 1968, Hilton was a leader of the Society of Afro-American Students; his father negotiated between them and the university administration. The Clarks were happily married for forty-five years, until Mamie's death. Kate Clark Harris directed the Northside Center for Child Development for four years after her mother's death.

A 60 Minutes report in the 1970s noted that the Clarks, who supported integration and desegregation busing, moved to Westchester County in 1950 because of concerns about failing public schools in the city. Kenneth Clark said: "My children have only one life and I could not risk that."

== Legacy and honors ==
- 1961 – Kenneth Clark received the Spingarn Medal of the National Association for the Advancement of Colored People (NAACP) for his contributions to promoting integration and better race relations.
- 1966 – Columbia University awarded each Clark the Nicholas Murray Butler Silver Medal, for the significance of their work.
- 1970 – Kenneth B. Clark was awarded an honorary doctorate (LL.D.) by Columbia University.
- 1975 – Kenneth B. Clarks was awarded the William L. Dawson Award, Congressional Black Caucus
- 1983 – Mamie Phipps Clark receives a Candace Award for Humanitarianism from the National Coalition of 100 Black Women
- 1985 – Four Freedoms Award in the category Freedom of Speech
- 1986 – Presidential Medal of Liberty
- 1994 – 102nd annual meeting of APA, 40 years after Brown v. Board of Education, Clark was presented with the APA Award for Outstanding Lifetime Contribution to Psychology. He was only one of six psychologists to receive that prestigious award.
- 2002 – Molefi Kete Asante named Kenneth Clark on his list of 100 Greatest African Americans.
- 2003 – American Psychological Foundation establishes the Kenneth B. and Mamie P. Clark Fund, to support "research and demonstration activities that promote the understanding of the relationship between self-identity and academic achievement with an emphasis on children in grade levels K-8".
- 2017 – Columbia University Department of Psychology established the Mamie Phipps Clark and Kenneth B. Clark Distinguished Lecture Award, which recognizes "extraordinary contributions of a senior scholar in the area of race and justice".
