= Wesleyan University Press =

American university press

- Parent company: Wesleyan University
- Founded: 1957
- Country of origin: United States
- Headquarters location: Middletown, Connecticut
- Key people: Suzanna Tamminen
- Publication types: Books
- Official website: wesleyan.edu/wespress

Wesleyan University Press is a university press that is part of Wesleyan University in Middletown, Connecticut. The press is currently directed by Suzanna Tamminen, a published poet and essayist.

== History and overview ==
Founded (in its present form) in 1957, the press publishes books of poetry and books on music, dance and performance, American Studies, and film. In 1965, Wesleyan sold its American Education Publications, a division of the press that published My Weekly Reader, but the university retained the scholarly division. All editing occurs at the editorial office building of the press on the Wesleyan campus. Publishing (printing) now occurs through a consortium of New England college academic presses.

Wesleyan University Press joined The Association of American Publishers trade organization in the Hachette v. Internet Archive lawsuit which resulted in the removal of access to over 500,000 books from global readers.

The press is notable among prestigious American academic presses for its poetry series, which publishes both established poets and new ones. The press has released more than 250 titles in its poetry series and has garnered, in that series alone, awards including five Pulitzer Prizes, a Bollingen Prize, three National Book Awards, two National Book Critics Circle Awards, and an American Book Award. According to The New York Times, university presses with bigger endowments, with financial backing from the state, or with large graduate programs do not enjoy the same status in the field of poetry that the Wesleyan University Press enjoys, nor have they won a comparable array of prizes in poetry. The press also has garnered Pulitzer Prizes, American Book Awards, and other awards in its other series.

Norman O. Brown and John Cage were two of the prominent early authors whose work was published by the press. The press's poetry series was nurtured in its infancy by noted poet Richard Wilbur, then an English professor at the university. In the mid-1950s, William Manchester, who would become a long time writer-in-residence and professor at the university, served as an editor at the press. Donald Hall, a future Poet Laureate of the United States, served as a member of the editorial board for poetry at the press from 1958 to 1964. In the 1960s, T.S. Eliot served both as a roving editor for the poetry series and special editorial consultant of the press. In the former capacity, Eliot's responsibilities included finding rising English and European poets for the press.

Wesleyan is the smallest college or university in the nation to have its own press, and the Wesleyan University Press has the second-oldest poetry series in the nation. Approximately 25 books are published each year.

Authors and poets published by the press include John Luther Adams, Rae Armantrout (including her Pulitzer Prize-winning collection Versed), Samuel R. Delany, James Dickey (18th U.S. Poet Laureate), Brenda Hillman, Paul Horgan (including two Pulitzer Prize-winning books), David Ignatow, Yusef Komunyakaa (including his Pulitzer Prize-winning collection Neon Vernacular), Justine Larbalestier, Heather McHugh, Juliet McMains, Farah Mendlesohn, Alice Notley, Leslie Scalapino, Louis Simpson (including his Pulitzer Prize-winning collection At The End Of The Open Road), Richard Slotkin, James Tate (including his Pulitzer Prize-winning collection James Tate: Selected Poems), Jean Valentine, Gerald Vizenor, Charles Wright, James Wright (including his Pulitzer Prize-winning collection Collected Poems). Recently, Wesleyan published a new edition of poetry from Jack Spicer, which went on to win a 2009 American Book Award, contributing to the resurgence of a poet who died in public obscurity (of acute alcoholism) in 1965.

== See also ==
- List of English-language book publishing companies
- List of university presses
- Jeannette Hopkins, director and editor-in-chief of Wesleyan Press (1980-89)
