= Specialized translation =

Concept in the translation business

Specialized translation is a term and concept used in the translation business and in translation schools. A text to be translated is specialized if translating it calls for knowledge in some field that would not normally be part of a translator's or translation student's general knowledge.

== Specialized translation in the translation business ==
The word 'specialized' applies differently to translators and to texts. Some translators work in a variety of fields (such as law, finance, medicine or environmental sciences), while others are 'specialized' or 'specialists' in the sense that they work exclusively in just one or two fields. A specialist may translate both specialized and non-specialized texts in those fields. A text to be translated is specialized if translating it calls for knowledge of the field that would not normally be part of a translator's general knowledge. A translator who advertises as a 'finance specialist' may sometimes be translating finance texts which are not specialized (do not require more than general financial knowledge). Professional translators who are able to translate specialized texts in a field can usually command higher prices for their work.

In order to understand the specialized text that is to be translated, and write the translation, the translator must have or acquire somewhat advanced or even highly advanced concepts of the relevant field. However, the level of understanding required to translate specialized texts is considerably less than the level possessed by practitioners of the field in question. Sometimes even experienced translators must consult practitioners when their knowledge falls short.

Understanding is necessary because translation is not a matter of replacing words in one language with words in another. Translators have to be able to guarantee that their translations have more or less the same meaning as the text in the original language. If they do not have a fairly good understanding of what the writer of that text was trying to say about the subject matter, then no such guarantee can be given.

Some translation businesses make a three-way distinction between 'general' texts (calling only for general knowledge of a field), 'specialized' texts (calling for advanced knowledge of a field) and 'highly specialized' texts (calling for detailed knowledge of a subject, such as jet engines or commercial law). The price charged per word will then vary with the degree of specialization. Many texts have parts which are general and parts which are specialized or highly specialized.

Aside from the concepts of a field, translators must know or discover the related terms in both languages. With some target languages, terms in fields new to the culture of its speakers must be invented.

It is often said that translators must also master the typical writing styles used in each of the genres in which they work (for example, a legal translator might handle contracts, court decisions, transcripts of court proceedings and so on). And they must tailor their writing style to the future readers of the translation. It is important for translators to have a clear idea of who those future readers will be. Some specialized texts are written by experts for other experts, some by experts for non-experts, some by people who are not experts but have more knowledge of the field than the intended readers (for example, science journalists writing for the general public). Some texts may address more than one kind of reader; for example, a study for the refurbishment of a bridge may have a section addressed to transportation managers, a section addressed to finance people, and a section addressed to engineers. The different sections will require different styles.

== Who translates specialized texts? ==
There used to be considerable debate about whether specialized texts should be translated by practitioners of the field in question or by professional translators. It might be thought that practitioners would make the best translators because specialized texts are very commonly 'expert-to-expert' (both the author and the intended readers are practitioners). However attempts to have texts translated by practitioners will very often encounter insuperable obstacles: it will be difficult or impossible to find a practitioner who not only possesses the necessary linguistic and translational skills, but is also interested in translating and available to complete the translation by the time it is wanted. It is easier to have a practitioner play the role of an advisor who is consulted by a professional translator, or else the role of a reviewer/editor who reads the completed translation looking for any conceptual or terminological errors.

That said, some people with degrees in law, for example, do become professional legal translators. In addition, practitioners in a field do sometimes engage in a little translation 'on the side'.

== Specialized translation at translation schools ==
Translation schools usually have courses designed to teach students how to acquire specialized concepts and the related terms. The students apply what they have learned by translating specialized texts, typically in a single field, or sometimes a couple of fields, with which the instructor is familiar. Such courses may focus on concepts and terms, or they may also cover field-specific and genre-specific writing styles. These courses are typically given after students have completed courses in which they translate non-specialized texts (texts which can be understood by calling on general knowledge that students will usually already possess), usually in a variety of fields.

Instructors grade student translations in various ways. Some simply subtract marks for each error in the translation, though the errors are often classified (mistranslations, term errors, grammar mistakes, and so on), with different numbers of marks subtracted for different kinds of error, and perhaps different degrees of seriousness of error. Other instructors base their marking on 'competencies': they identify certain skills the students must acquire (ability to find terms, ability to write coherently in the target language, ability to understand specialized concepts and so on); then they assign a mark for each skill (a student might get 80/100 for terminology, 60/100 for coherent writing, and so on).

== Some uses of "specialized translation" and its synonyms ==
Here are some examples of the ways the term specialized translation has been used. Some people use technical translation, pragmatic translation or LSP translation as synonyms (LSP = language for special purposes or language for specific purposes).

1) "Specialized translation covers the specialist subject fields falling under non-literary translation, the best known of which include science and technology, economics, marketing, law, politics, medicine and mass media...as well as lesser researched areas such as maritime navigation, archaeology...."

2) "Due to the semantic ambiguity of the English adjective ‘technical’, the term can relate to content either from technology and engineering or from any specialized domain. In this article, the term is understood in the narrower sense. In the broader sense, the activity is also called ‘specialized translation’. Much of what is said here about technical translation equally holds for specialized translation and to some extent also for specialized communication in general."

3) "I felt that a journal dedicated to specialised translation was needed, both to promote research in non-literary communication and to exchange information between translators, subject-field specialists and academics."

As can be seen, specialized translation is often defined by contrast with literary translation, though one person has written an entire book opposing this view. Much translation theory has been rooted in literary translation even though, in today's world, most translation is not literary (figures are hard to come by, though most people in the field would probably agree).

Apparently similar terms in other languages (French 'traduction spécialisée', German 'Fachübersetzung') are not necessarily used with the same range of meanings as the English term specialized translation.

In 2018, the Journal of Specialized Translation Issue 38 included a detailed review of the articles it had published since its founding in 2004, showing how the journal's concept of specialized had changed.

== See also ==
- Technical translation
- Language for specific purposes
