= Literary editor =

Editor overseeing aspects of written work

A literary editor is a editor responsible for refining and overseeing the quality of written content in a newspaper, magazine or other publication. Literary editor deals with aspects concerning literature and books, especially reviews. A literary editor may also help with editing books themselves, by providing services such as proof reading, copy-editing, and literary criticism. Their work often involves reviewing literary pieces, book reviews, and essays to ensure clarity, coherence, and adherence to editorial standards. Literary editors are sometimes referred to as copy editors or production editors, depending on their specific role within a publication.

== Responsibilities ==
Literary editor is responsible for overseeing content related to literature and books in newspapers, magazines, and other publications. A literary editor is primarily concerned with the mechanics of writing and the overall structure of the content rather than its technical subject matter. Their responsibilities may include ensuring accuracy in grammar, punctuation, and formatting; refining language use and improving sentence and paragraph structure; applying capitalization, punctuation, and typographical elements to enhance readability; maintaining consistency in style and format, such as in headings and figure captions; conducting proofreading to identify and correct spelling errors and layout inconsistencies and overseeing various technical aspects of writing and production. Literary editors ensure that written material is presented in a clear and readable manner, often collaborating with writers to enhance the overall quality of a manuscript.

=== Book coverage ===
Most magazines and newspapers have a literary editor who organizes the coverage of books. They are responsible for selecting books for review, editing book-related articles, and maintaining relationships with publishers and literary critics. As the primary contact for book review submissions, they are responsible for determining which literary works receive media attention. In addition to overseeing the literary section, literary editors may facilitate the inclusion of book-related content in other parts of a publication.

== Consulting editor ==
A consulting editor is a non-staff, independent literary editor. A consulting editor may be an independent, freelance editor, or a scholar providing expertise via consulting.

== See also ==
- Developmental editor
- Book editor
