= Juliet McMains =

Juliet E. McMains is an American dance scholar and instructor, the author of the Glamour Addiction, the first comprehensive study of the United States DanceSport.

Juliet McMains started doing ballroom dancing as a teenager. Eventually she became professional ballroom dancer until she stopped competing in 2003. Her Senior thesis in the college was Tradition and Transgression: Gender Roles in Ballroom Dancing. She earned B.A. in Women's Studies from Harvard University and PhD in dance history and theory (2003) at the University of California, Riverside.

As of 2006, she is a teacher of World Dance History, Beginning Salsa, Beginning Tango, Beginning Swing and Beginning Ballroom dance at the University of Washington, Seattle. Her academic specializations include dance ethnography, social dance history, post-structural theory, cultural studies, and feminist theory.

== Scholar works ==
- 2006: Juliet E. McMains, "Glamour Addiction: Inside the American Ballroom Dance Industry" Wesleyan University Press, ISBN 0-8195-6774-4
- 2002: Juliet McMains and Danielle Robinson. "Swinging Out: Southern California's Lindy Revival." in: I See America Dancing: Selected Readings, 1685–2000, Ed. Maureen Needham. University of Illinois Press
