= Digital Humanities Summer Institute =

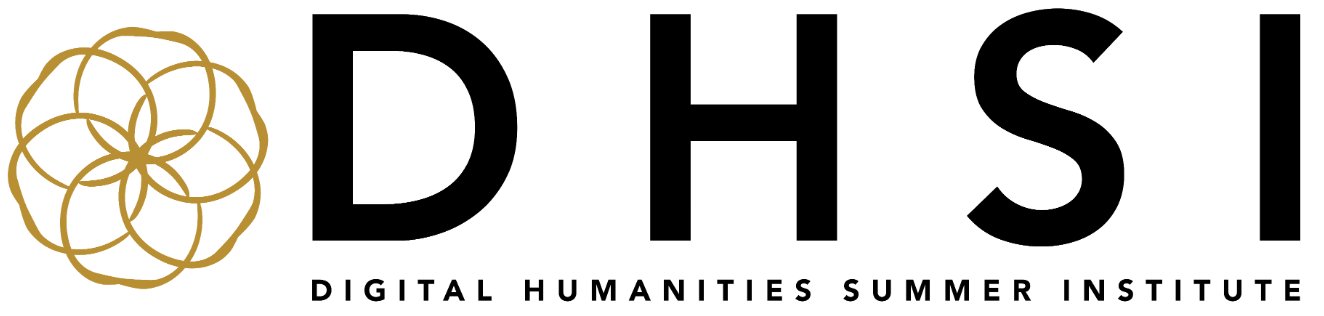
- Genre: Digital Humanities
- Frequency: Annually
- Venue: Université de Montréal
- Locations: Montréal, Québec
- Coordinates: 45°30′14.76″N 73°36′51.48″W
- Country: Canada
- Inaugurated: 2001
- Organiser: Michael Sinatra, DHSI Co-Director and CRIHN Director; Parham Aledavood, DHSI Co-Director
- Members: Centre de Recherche Interuniversitaire sur les Humanités Numériques
- Sponsors: Centre de Recherche Interuniversitaire sur les Humanités Numériques (CRIHN); Social Sciences and Humanities Research Council (SSHRC); Université de Montréal;
- Website: dhsi.org

The Digital Humanities Summer Institute (DHSI) is an annual digital humanities training program held in June at the University of Victoria, British Columbia, and since 2024 at the University of Montréal, Canada. It is an example of an academic summer school. DHSI now attracts over 600 participants for two weeks of courses, forum discussions, paper sessions, and unconferences. DHSI has an International Advisory Board.

In both the past and present, major overarching themes of DHSI have included collaboration, interdisciplinarity, and the creation and cultivation of a larger Digital Humanities community beyond the structure of the typical academic environment. It has been especially noted that DHSI encourages opportunities for digital humanists at all stages of their careers, levels of expertise in the field, and roles in the contribution to the Digital Humanities to engage and network with each other.

DHSI's course offerings run parallel to the DHSI Conference & Colloquium, formerly known as the DHSI Colloquium. Founded in 2009 by Diane Jakacki and Cara Leitch, the event invited graduate-only submissions until 2011.

== History ==
DHSI started in 2001 at Vancouver Island University. The inaugural DHSI event included lead speakers Susan Hockey, Nancy Ide, Willard McCarty, and John Unsworth, and there were some 35 participants in attendance. In 2004, DHSI moved to the University of Victoria, where it was hosted for 25 years, under Ray Siemens, a research fellow at the Institute for English Studies. When at the University of Victoria, DHSI was led by Siemens's research lab, the Electronic Textual Cultures Lab (ETCL) and welcomed an average of 800 students per year. Beginning with the 2025 institute, DHSI relocated to the Université de Montréal, where it is hosted by the Centre de recherche interuniversitaire sur les humanités numériques (CRIHN). It is estimated that, as of 2012, there were approximately 1,800 alumni of the institute, with a large portion returning over a period of multiple years to take further courses.

== Programming ==
DHSI offers multiple courses over a two-week period, during the month of June and is open to faculty, staff, and students. The wide selection of courses ranges from foundational digital humanities courses requiring little to no prerequisites, such as Coding Fundamentals for Humanists, to more specialized courses like Convivial Machine Learning. Some courses are offered in French, but most are taught in English. All courses taught at the annual DHSI are eligible for the Canadian Certificate for Digital Humanities/Certificat Canadien en Humanités Numériques (cc:DH/HN) which is supported by the Canadian Society for Digital Humanities and the Digital Research Alliance of Canada.

Alongside practical trainings, DHSI runs the DHSI Conference and other aligned events over the same two week timeframe. Some of the events include Lunch Time DH Talks with digital humanities experts, info sessions for the DH certificate, lightening talks by DH scholars and end-of-day presentations.

== Keynote Speakers ==
=== 2026 DHSI ===
- Dr. Tully Barnett from Adelaide University, Australia,
- Dr. David Wrisley from NYU Abu Dhabi, UAE,
- Dr. Jean-Philippe Magué from ENS Lyon, France
- Dr. Cecily Raynor from McGill University, Canada.

=== 2025 DHSI ===
- Dr. Béatrice Joyeux-Prunel from Université de Genève
- Dr. Marcello Vitali-Rosati from Université de Montréal
- Dr. Amanda Lawrence from RMIT University
- Dr. Ichiro Fujinaga from McGill University
