= Kiri Davis =

American film director

Kiri Laurelle Davis is an American filmmaker based in New York City. Her first documentary, A Girl Like Me (2005), made while enrolled at Reel Works Teen Filmmaking, received significant news coverage.

Kiri Davis' mother, an education consultant, raised her daughter to be proud of her African-American heritage. After completing her high school education two years after making her award-winning documentary, Davis was due to matriculate at Howard University, a historically black university in Washington DC for the fall 2007 semester.

When aged just 16 and a student at the Urban Academy, Davis became interested in Brown v. Board of Education, and also Kenneth and Mamie Clark's groundbreaking study of color preferences among young black children. She repeated the Clark study and asked children to choose between two dolls: a light-skinned one and a dark-skinned one. Fifteen out of the twenty-one children preferred the lighter-skinned doll when asked to pick "the nice doll." The documentary that resulted includes selections from her repeat study and interviews with friends who talk about the importance of color, hair quality, and facial features for young black women today in the United States.

== Screenings ==
- Tribeca Film Festival
- The 6th Annual Media That Matters.
- Silverdocs: AFI/Discovery Channel Documentary Festival
- HBO

== Awards ==
- Winner of The Diversity Award at the 6th Annual Media That Matters film festival

== Film appearances ==
Davis discusses A Girl Like Me in the 2008 film The Black Candle, directed by M. K. Asante Jr. and narrated by Maya Angelou.
