= Stealth edit =

Journalism term

A stealth edit occurs when an online resource is changed without leaving a record to indicate that the information has been changed from its original published state. Stealth edits are considered unethical in journalism, as they are a technique that allows authors to retroactively change what is written.

A common scenario would be a reporter posting a diatribe against something, followed by a blogger posting that the reporter is too extreme, followed by the reporter stealth editing the original post to be less extreme. The result is that the blogger looks like the one who is too extreme, since the public can't tell that the original post has been changed.

Stealth edits may often be detected by comparing a current web page against its archived or cached version.

Editors and journalists have argued that making undeclared edits to articles is a routine part of digital journalism, claiming that it allows them to give the most complete version of a story. Readers, however, often feel that it is unethical or suspicious for a news publication to make undeclared changes to a story, especially when the edits significantly change the story's context.

== Non-stealthy edit ==
There are a variety of ethical techniques to make corrections or updates to published content.

- The title of the page can have an update notification prepended or appended to it, along with a brief description of what has changed.
- Deletions may remain but be crossed out, while additions are made in a different colour.
- Publicly accessible change logs may be kept for every edit.

The common feature is that all these methods explicitly let the reader know that an edit has been made. A grey area exists when the edit is trivial (such as a typographic error). Some organizations flag all updates; others make a judgment call about what is considered a substantive update.

== See also ==
- NewsDiffs – Archive website tracking changes to news articles
- Web archiving – Preserving history of web pages
- The Ministry of Truth – Fictional governmental organisations in the novel Nineteen Eighty-Four
