= Tremédica =

Organization for medical translation

The International Association of Medical Translators and Writers and Related Sciences (Spanish: Asociación Internacional de Traductores y Redactores de Medicina y Ciencias Afines, acronym Tremédica) is an international organization devoted to the promotion of the professions related to medical translation.

== Overview ==
Tremédica was established in December 2005 in Washington, D.C. as a non-profit organization and currently registered in Barcelona, Spain.

It has members from all the Spanish-speaking world. This organization actively takes part in the organization of events relevant for the benefit of the linguistic aspects of the medical fields.

== See also ==
- Translators Association
