= Language professional =

Individuals who support authors in publishing

Language professionals are individuals who support authors in publishing by helping produce documents of appropriate scope and quality (in any language). Their role is particularly important in the research setting, especially whenever the authors are not native English speakers but are required to publish in English for international communication. The work of language professionals falls within the language industry.

== Activities ==
The writing support provided by language professionals may involve teaching specific writing skills, translating documents into the desired publishing language, editing drafts at various stages of completion, guiding the creation of a new document, and—in some cases—writing for authors. Thus, the services offered by language professionals include language teaching (especially the teaching of academic writing), translation, author editing, developmental editing, and writing (medical writing and technical writing). These activities differ in functional terms but share a common goal, namely helping authors produce quality papers for publication.

== Business characteristics ==
Language professionals may be self-employed (freelance or small entrepreneurs) or employed at universities, research institutes and companies that generate scientific-technical documentation. They may also work indirectly through a translation or editing agency (although the presence of an intermediary may hinder the development of a direct, professional relationship with the author-client). Their services are provided in classroom, distance or one-on-one settings. They may offer only one type of service or combine several services to best serve a particular author group; often they specialize in a subject area in which they have prior training or work experience.

By adopting the label language professional, those who offer writing support services emphasize that they are dedicated to running a service business (or, if employed, they adopt an entrepreneurial spirit) and that their conduct is guided by professional values and ethics. As professionals, they work with confidence and use specialized knowledge and skills to find tailored solutions for each client's request. Language professionals have also been called professional language consultants, as outlined by Mediterranean Editors and Translators: "Professional language consultants distinguish themselves by the quality of their product, by a strong sense of business ethics, and [by] a high level of professional organization." Another term sometimes used is language service provider, while the related, but broader literacy broker includes "editors, reviewers, academic peers, and English-speaking friends and colleagues, who mediate text production in a number of ways".

== Ethical working practices ==
The language professional facilitates the writing process without interfering with the authors' ownership of and responsibility for the published document. They do not substitute the authors' role in conceiving the document and producing the content: they are not ghostwriters. They are familiar with issues of publication ethics and adhere to publishing guidelines, especially those of the Committee on Publication Ethics and, in the medical field at least, the International Committee of Medical Journal Editors. In particular, the work of the language professional does not cross the boundary into authorship. Rather, it is becoming increasingly common (especially in the biomedical sciences) for the language professional's contribution to a paper to be recognized in the paper's acknowledgements section.

== Continuing professional development ==
Given that language professionals are called on to solve problems that cannot be standardized, they engage in educational activities to keep up with new developments in, for example, publishing standards, tools and technology, didactic methods and ethics. Educational opportunities and materials, including conferences, training workshops and publications, are offered by the numerous membership associations open to linguists, editors, translators and writers. Examples of associations providing continuing professional development activities are the European Association for the Teaching of Academic Writing, the Council of Science Editors, the European Medical Writers Association, the European Association of Science Editors, the Chartered Institute of Linguists, the Chartered Institute of Editing and Proofreading and Mediterranean Editors and Translators, the first association to specifically aim to bring together different types of language professionals.
