= Jeannette Hopkins =

- Born: 1923; Camden, NJ
- Died: 2011 (aged 87–88); Portsmouth, NH
- Education: Vassar, BA, English, 1944; Columbia School of Journalism, MS, 1945
- Known for: Book editing

Jeannette Hopkins (1923–2011) was an American editor known for her career at a time when few women worked in the field. In the mid-1940s, she was a reporter for the New Haven Register, the Providence Journal-Bulletin and the Oklahoma City Times. In 1952, she was senior editor at Beacon Press, Harcourt Brace & World, and Harper & Row. In 1973, she worked as a consulting editor for Harper & Row, McGraw-Hill, MacMillan, Random House, and Yale. In 1980, she was named director and editor-in-chief at Wesleyan University Press.

Praised for her "wide-ranging intellectual curiosity that informed her taste in books combined with a sophisticated sense of language and book structure ... [and] her extraordinary intellectual toughness," Hopkins developed a "stable" of historians, journalists, political scientists, theologians, and scholars, including James MacGregor Burns, Jacques Barzun and Eugene Genovese, Frank Mankiewicz, Edwin Newman, Annie Dillard, and C. S. Lewis. In a letter to the editor of the New York Times Magazine, she noted that "Authors have an afterlife that may be lasting, the life of their books."

Guided by an interest in "public affairs, specifically civil liberties and race relations" and described by PEN America as a "social justice advocate," Hopkins was an elected at-large member of the American Civil Liberties Union (ACLU) National Board, as well as a member of their National Advisory Council. In 1970, Hopkins co-authored A Relevant War Against Poverty with Kenneth B. Clark. Hopkins also authored articles and books on Unitarianism, civil rights, and New Hampshire history. Despite her focus on nonfiction, however, she was credited for providing some editing to BOA Editions Ltd., a not-for-profit literary publisher known for their poetry, poetry-in-translation, and short fiction.

== Authors ==
A partial list of Hopkins's authors include:

- James MacGregor Burns
- Ben H. Bagdikian
- Jacques Barzun
- Robert Bendiner
- Marquis W. Childs
- Kenneth B. Clark
- Annie Dillard
- Eugene Genovese
- Leonard W. Levy
- C.S. Lewis
- Frank Mankiewicz
- Lewis Mumford
- Edwin Newman
- Stan Steiner

== Bibliography ==
- Clarke, Kenneth B., and Hopkins, Jeannette. A Relevant War Against Poverty. Harper & Row, 1970. ASIN B00B2CXVEC
- Hopkins, Jeannette. Fourteen Journeys to Unitarianism. Beacon Press, 1959. ASIN B00188159I
- Hopkins, Jeannette, "Racial justice and the press: Mutual suspicion or 'the saving remnant'?" Metropolitan Applied Research Center, 1968. ASIN B0006CHDW0
- Hopkins, Jeannette. Legacy: A history of the South Church endowment. Unitarian-Universalist Church of Portsmouth, N.H., 1995. ISBN: BX9861.P67 H67.
- Butler, Jeffrey. Cradock: How Segregation and Apartheid came to a South African Town. Richard Elphick and Jeannette Hopkins, eds. University of Virginia Press, 2017. ISBN: Sc E 18-129
- The Warner House. Joyce Geary Volk and Jeannette Hopkins, eds. The Warner House Association, 2006. ISBN: JQG 07-622

== Archive ==
- Guide to the Jeannette Hopkins Papers, 1922-2011
