= Ray Siemens =

Canadian professor

Ray Siemens is a professor in the faculty of humanities at the University of Victoria, British Columbia, Canada and former Canada Research Chair in Humanities Computing. Siemens is a recipient of the Antonio Zampolli Prize, presented by the Alliance of Digital Humanities Organizations (ADHO) for outstanding contributions to the field of Digital Humanities.

== Appointments ==
In addition to his role at the University of Victoria, Siemens has been a visiting research fellow at the Institute for English Studies, London (2005 & 2008), visiting professor at Sheffield Hallam University (2004–2011), Ritsumeikan University (2010), New York University (2013), the University of Passau (2014), the University of Tokyo (2014), and Western Sydney University (2014–2015). As of 2017, he was visiting senior research fellow in the Department of Digital Humanities at King's College London.

Siemens is the Director Emeritus of the Digital Humanities Summer Institute, one of the largest community gatherings in the Digital Humanities.

Siemens is a member of the Governing Council of Canada's Social Science and Humanities Research Council (SSHRC), Chair of the Modern Language Association (MLA) Committee on Scholarly Editions, and Chair of the Alliance of Digital Humanities Organizations (ADHO). He former chair of the MLA Committee on Information Technology, president of the Canadian Society for Digital Humanities, and Vice-president of the Federation for the Humanities and Social Sciences.

== Scholarship ==
Siemens is a literary and textual scholar who largely focuses on Renaissance literature, electronic books, and the Digital Humanities. He has edited several Renaissance texts, as well as a number of high-profile DH titles, including A Companion to Digital Humanities (Blackwell 2004), A Companion to Digital Literary Studies (Blackwell 2008), and the MLA's evolving digital anthology, Literary Studies in the Digital Age. He also talked in an interview with fellow researcher Julianne Nyhan about this first experience in the Digital Humanities as an initial English undergraduate.

Siemens received the ADHO's Antonio Zampolli Prize in 2014. He has also received the University of Victoria Humanities Award for Research Excellence (2009), and the University of Waterloo Arts in Academics Alumni Achievement (2008).
