= Developmental editing =

Writing support during manuscript production

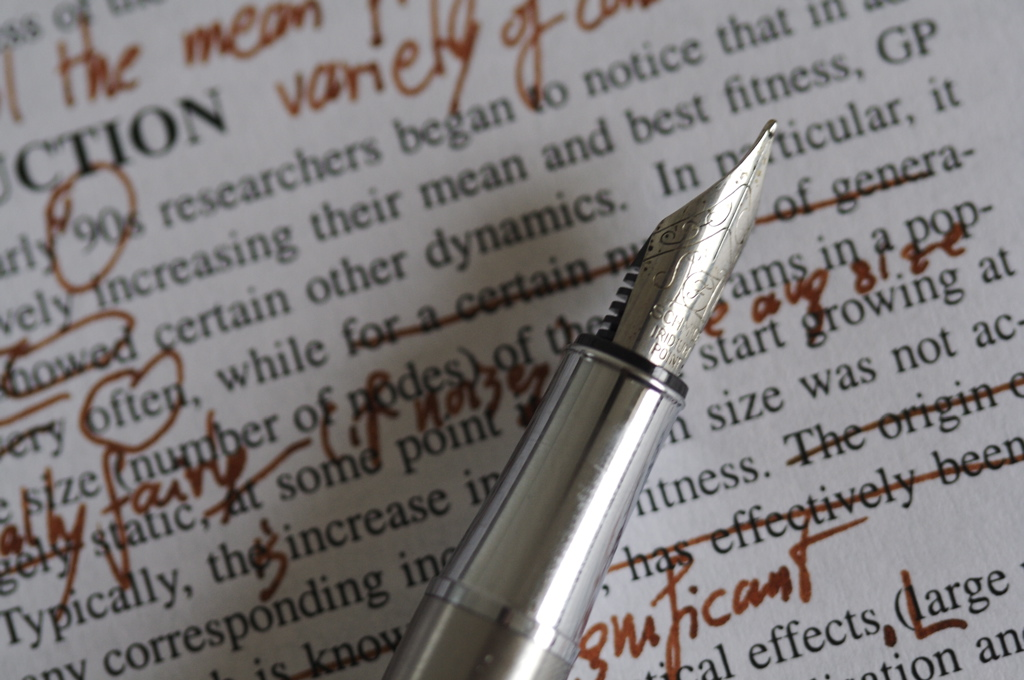
Edits made in red ink on a paper

Developmental editing is a form of writing support that comes into play before or during the production of a publishable manuscript, in fiction, non-fiction, and academic writing (including textbooks). As explained by Scott Norton in his book Developmental editing: a handbook for freelancers, authors, and publishers, developmental editing involves "significant structuring or restructuring of a manuscript's discourse". Developmental editors are a type of language professional.

== The work of developmental editors ==
A developmental editor may guide an author (or group of authors) in conceiving the topic, planning the overall structure, and developing an outline—and may coach authors in their writing, chapter by chapter. This is true developmental editing, but not the most common way of working. A complete developmental edit involves addressing organization and restructuring the manuscript, such as moving content from one chapter to another and requesting additional content from the author. More commonly, a developmental editor is engaged only after someone (usually the publisher) decides that the authors' draft requires substantial revision and restructuring. In these cases, developmental editing is a radical form of substantive editing.

Irrespective of when the developmental editor is brought into a writing project, authors retain control over the document and are responsible for providing the content. Developmental editors typically don't make the changes directly to the manuscript but instead provide guidance and suggestions, although some "hands-on editing is used to illustrate principles of craft and mechanics." An editor who creates significant amounts of content is no longer an editor but a contributing author or a ghostwriter. After completing a developmental edit, an editor typically provides a letter to the author (often in the form of an email) explaining the main suggestions.

In a traditional publishing house, developmental editors work with an author to refine the manuscript. Many publishing houses today, however, do little developmental editing. Instead, they rely on agents to vet and submit manuscripts that are already in shape, reducing the work required in the developmental editing stage.

== Textbooks ==
Textbooks represent one book genre in which developmental editors are involved from the beginning, and often serve as the book's project manager. Their role is fundamental in textbook publishing because it is often the publisher, not the author, who decides on the book's content, scope, and level. Thus, developmental editors are often on staff at scholastic publishing houses. In textbook publishing, the developmental editor may be responsible for creating the outline to guide the author's writing—and may also prepare short parts of text, such as legends, exercises, and supporting materials. Furthermore, the editor manages text length, edits the developing manuscript, and may instruct an artist regarding illustrations.

== Academic Research ==
In academic research, career advancement and funding depend on the quantity and quality of published papers. However, many researchers lack formal training in research paper writing. They may benefit from substantive editing by a language professional, such as an academic writing instructor or authors' editor. When a manuscript requires major restructuring to align with genre expectations, developmental editing may be necessary, though professional and ethical considerations apply.

Developmental editing in research is useful in two main situations. First, researchers who struggle to produce a manuscript likely to pass peer review may seek assistance from language professionals during the writing process. Second, those facing repeated journal rejections may require help addressing complex reviewer comments. In both cases, this support extends beyond author editing to academic mentoring. Developmental editing-based mentoring programs have been implemented by an international education journal and a U.S. medical school. It is also central to AuthorAID, which connects researchers from developing countries with experienced mentors and editors to enhance knowledge dissemination.

Authors' editors, academic writing instructors, and translators may provide developmental editing alongside other support services, such as writing education, translation, and linguistic editing. When assisting novice researchers, language professionals focus on editorial—not authorial—duties, ensuring they do not engage in ghost writing if authorship is not intended.

== Fiction ==
The tasks that developmental editors face in fiction are fairly different from those faced by editors working with nonfiction. Adam O'Connor Rodriguez, senior editor at Hawthorn books, splits the tasks of developmental fiction editing into three main parts: structure, narrative, and language.

Structure is the container that holds the story, including its length, order, and pacing. Narrative is all of the story elements such as characters, major scenes, pacing, and other big picture elements. Language includes dialogue, physical description, sensory information, and sentence structure (O'Connor Rodriguez 2018).

For example, an editor would take a finished manuscript and provide ideas for fixing plot holes, inconsistencies in characters, scenes that need more depth, and scenes that need to be cut.
