= ISO 17100 =

ISO standard

ISO 17100:2015 Translation Services-Requirements for Translation Services was published on May 1, 2015. It was prepared by the International Organization for Standardization's Technical Committee ISO/TC 37, Terminology and other language and content resources, Subcommittee SC 5, Translation, interpreting and related technology.

== Description ==
This standard "specifies requirements for all aspects of the translation process directly affecting the quality and delivery of translation services." It includes provisions for translation service providers (TSPs) concerning the management of core processes, minimum qualification requirements, the availability and management of resources, and other actions necessary for the delivery of a quality translation service. The use of raw output from machine translation plus post-editing is outside the scope of this standard. Neither does it apply to interpreting services.

Based on EN 15038, this standard transfers the original EN 15038 requirements to the ISO framework. For example, it defines resource types including human resources (such as translators, revisers, reviewers, proofreaders and project managers) as well as technical and technological resources. Translation steps including translation (including a check of translation by the translator themselves), revision by a second person, review (an optional step, designed in order to assess the suitability of the translation against the agreed purpose, domain, and the recommended corrective measures), proofreading (an optional pre-publication check) and final verification are defined by this standard. Besides the standard itself, there are six Annexes that help to explain certain aspects of the standard by providing examples or graphics so as to visualize the standard, e.g. Annex A visualizes translation workflow, Annex D lists pre-production tasks.

=== Minimum standards ===
The new characteristics of ISO 17100 compared to EN 15038 are: firstly, it sets minimum standards such as the requirements for translations to be subject to revision by a second person, which is an obligatory part of the standard. Minimum standards certification in the U.S.A. is administered by the U.S.A. Translators Association (the U.S. A.T.A.).

=== Qualifications ===
Secondly, although widely and controversially discussed whilst in development, a new requirement regarding the appropriate qualifications in the subject area regarding the translation work is added in the standard as it prescribes that a translator should have “a certificate of competence in translation awarded by an appropriate government body”. "In this way, translator, proofreader and reviser all need to have sufficient knowledge in the field of the texts to be translated to understand and deal with any problems ".

=== Pre-production ===
Thirdly, the work involved in the pre-production processes has been extended considerably. In this ISO standard, the success of a translation project lies in the cooperation between clients and contractors, rather than completely a responsibility of the contractors. Meanwhile, all relevant requirements, including quality of the target text, nature and scope of quality assurance, and use of style guides, should also be defined and agreed on in advance.

=== Feedback process ===
Fourthly, the standard requires a process for handling client feedback, which is used to find out the actual quality of translation and the satisfaction of client. Meanwhile, the translation service provider is also responsible for the archiving of translation projects.

=== Data protection ===
Last but not the least, ISO 17100 states that data protection requirements must be met as translations are sometimes confidential, involving sensitive information from the client.
