= List of American copy editors =

This is a list of some notable current and former American copy editors.

== American copy editors ==
- Lois Bryan Adams – editor, Michigan Farmer
- Margaret L. Bailey – editor and proprietor, The Philanthropist; editor, The Youth's Monthly Visitor and The National Era
- Catharine Webb Barber – editor, Madison Visitor and Southern Literary Companion; editor and proprietor, Miss Barber's Weekly
- Melvin L. Barnet – copy editor, The New York Times
- Josephine Cushman Bateham – editor, ladies department, Ohio Cultivator
- Emma Lee Benedict – editorial staff, New York School Journal; managing editor, Scientific Temperance Journal
- Tosh Berman
- Theodore M. Bernstein – former editor of The New York Times; author of The Careful Writer, Watch Your Language and several other books on grammar and usage
- Anna Braden – editor, Presbyterian Visitor
- Florence Anderson Clark – co-editor, The Kentucky People
- William G. Connolly – co-author of The New York Times Manual of Style and Usage; member of the American Copy Editors Society executive board
- Harriet L. Cramer – editor and publisher, The Evening Wisconsin
- Nannie Webb Curtis – editor, Texas White Ribbon, the official organ of the Texas Woman's Christian Temperance Union
- Josephine Donovan
- Benjamin Dreyer – copy chief, Random House
- Mary Fels – editor, The Public: A Journal of Democracy
- Jessie Forsyth – editor, The Temperance Brotherhood, The Massachusetts Templar, International Good Templar, and The Dawn
- Ella M. George – editor, Pennsylvania W.C.T.U. Bulletin
- Hugh Hefner – worked at Fortune magazine as a copy editor before founding Playboy magazine
- Annabel Morris Holvey – editor, The Bulletin (Pennsylvania); assistant editor, The People
- Corinne Stocker Horton – society editor, The Atlanta Journal-Constitution
- Liv Mammone — editor of Uma Dwivedi’s poetry collection They Called her Goddess; we Named her Girl, the speculative fiction series Margins and Murmurations by author and activist, Otter Lieffe, and the literary press Game Over Books
- Annie Virginia McCracken – proprietor and editor of The Pine Forest Echo
- John McIntyre – assistant managing editor for the copy desk at The Baltimore Sun; a past president of the American Copy Editors Society; author of the blog You Don't Say of The Baltimore Sun
- Dorothea Rhodes Lummis Moore – dramatic editor and musical editor, Los Angeles Times
- Mary Norris (copy editor)
- Patricia T. O'Conner
- Eleanor Gould Packard
- Elizabeth Fry Page – associate editor, American Homes and Taylor-Trotwood Magazine
- Sarah Maria Clinton Perkins – editor, A True Republic
- Alice Hobbins Porter – editor, Chicago Inter Ocean
- Anna Rankin Riggs – founder, editor, Oregon White Ribbon
- Pam Robinson – co-founder and first president of the American Copy Editors Society
- Allan M. Siegal – co-author of The New York Times Manual of Style and Usage; retired
- Lura Eugenie Brown Smith – editor, Milwaukee Sunday Telegraph; co-editor and owner, Northwestern Freemason; associate and literary editor, The Masonic Tribune
- Jennie O. Starkey – journalist, editor, Detroit Free Press
- Jane Agnes Stewart – associate editor, The Union Signal; editor, Oak and Ivy Leaf and Young Women
- Susie Forrest Swift – editor, All the World, the international organ of the Salvation Army
- Sarah Katherine Taylor – editor, The Little Christian, All Nations Monthly, and Bible Faith Mission Standard
- Bill Walsh – copy editor for the Washington Post, he also authored three books about the profession of copy editing and ran a website focused upon copy editing titled "The Slot".
- Alice Willard – editor, Times (Loup City, Nebraska); managing editor, Woman's Signal Budget (London)

== See also ==
- ACES: The Society for Editing
- Lists of Americans
- Proofreading
