= Bill Walsh (disambiguation) =

Bill Walsh (1931–2007) was an American football coach, most known for his career with the San Francisco 49ers.

Bill Walsh may also refer to:

- Bill Walsh (rugby league) (1891–1981), New Zealand rugby league player
- Bill Walsh (footballer, born 1909) (1909–1965), English footballer, see List of Oldham Athletic A.F.C. players (25–99 appearances)
- Bill Walsh (producer) (1913–1975), American film producer
- Bill Walsh (hurler) (1922–2013), Irish hurler
- Bill Walsh (footballer) (1923–2014), English footballer
- Bill Walsh (American football, born 1927) (1927–2012), American football player at University of Notre Dame, player and coach in the National Football League
- Bill Walsh (author) (1961–2017), American author and newspaper editor
- Bill Walsh (firefighter) (born 1957), American firefighter and television actor
- Bill Walsh, former drummer for punk band Cosmic Psychos
- Ravager (Bill Walsh), a villain from DC Comics

== See also ==
- Billy Walsh (disambiguation)
- William Walsh (disambiguation)
- Bill Walsh College Football, a 1993 American football videogame
- Bill Welsh (1911–2000), American television announcer
- William Welsh (disambiguation)
