= William Welch =

William Welch may refer to:

- William C. Welch (born 1977), American professional wrestler for the CZW
- William Welch (cricketer, born 1907) (1907–1983), Australian cricketer
- William Welch (cricketer, born 1911) (1911–1940), Australian cricketer
- William Welch (printer), American manufacturer
- William Welch II, former chief of the Public Integrity Section of the DOJ Criminal Division
- William A. Welch (1868–1941), American engineer and environmentalist
- William H. Welch (1850–1934), founder of Johns Hopkins Medical School and instrumental reformer of medical education in the United States
- William Welsh (actor) (1870–1946), or William Welch, American actor
- William H. Welch (judge) (1805–1863), fourth and last Chief Justice of the Supreme Court of Minnesota Territory
- William H. Welch, known as Wilton Welch (born 1884) Australian actor, dramatist, director
- William Welch (designer) (born 1972), English industrial designer
- William W. Welch (1818–1892), member of the U.S. House of Representatives from Connecticut
- William Neville Welch (1906–1999), Church of England bishop
- William Welch Deloitte (1818-1898), British founder of what became the professional services network, Deloitte
- Will Welch (William Andrew Welch, born 1990) , English rugby union player
- Bill Welch (William Lee Welch Jr., 1941–2009), American politician and mayor
- SS William H. Welch, a Liberty ship

== See also ==
- Will Welch (editor) (born 1981), American magazine editor and writer
- William Welsh (disambiguation)
