= William Welsh =

William Welsh may refer to:

- William Welsh (RAF officer) (1891–1962), British Royal Air Force officer
- Willie Welsh (1907–1987), Scottish rugby player
- William Welsh (actor) (1870–1946), American actor
- William Welsh (Canadian politician) (1822–1905), merchant, ship owner and politician in Prince Edward Island
- William Welsh (footballer) (fl. 1919–20), footballer for Grimsby Town
- William P. Welsh (1889–1984), American muralist, portrait painter, and illustrator
- William Halliday Welsh (1879–1972), Scottish rugby union player
- Bill Welsh (1911–2000), American television announcer
- Bill Welsh (footballer, born 1908) (1908–1987), Australian rules footballer for Geelong
- Bill Welsh (footballer, born 1924) (1924–2019), Australian rules footballer for Collingwood
- William Welsh, brother of John Welsh

== See also ==
- William Welch (disambiguation)
- Bill Walsh (disambiguation)
- William Walsh (disambiguation)
