= Billy Walsh =

Billy Walsh may refer to:

- Billy Walsh (polo) (1907–1992), Irish polo player
- Billy Walsh (Australian footballer) (1911–1986), Australian rules footballer
- Billy Walsh (curler) (1917–1971), Canadian curler
- Billy Walsh (footballer, born 1921) (1921–2006), Irish footballer
- Billy Walsh (boxer) (born 1963), Irish boxer
- Billy Walsh (soccer, born 1972), American soccer player and coach
- Billy Walsh (Third Watch), character on the American TV series Third Watch, portrayed by Bill Walsh

== See also ==
- William Walsh (disambiguation)
- Bill Walsh (disambiguation)
