= Los Angeles Times–Washington Post News Service =

Former joint news service

- Company type: News agency
- Industry: Media
- Founded: 1962; 64 years ago
- Founders: Otis Chandler & Philip Graham
- Defunct: 2009; 17 years ago
- Fate: corporate divorce
- Headquarters: United States
- Area served: United States
- Key people: Leonard Downie Jr.
- Services: domestic and foreign news coverage, columns, syndication
- Parent: Los Angeles Times and The Washington Post

The Los Angeles Times–Washington Post News Service, sometimes referred to as simply the Times-Post News Service, was a joint news agency in the United States that was created as a partnership between the Los Angeles Times and The Washington Post and existed from 1962 to 2009. It served to provide news coverage to its clients, which numbered over 600, and to syndicate articles from both papers for other news organizations. Rather than being a full-fledged wire service such as the Associated Press or Reuters, the Los Angeles Times–Washington Post News Service was what was known as a supplemental news service.

== Origin ==
The joint service was formed in 1962 and was the product of discussions between the two newspapers' well-known publishers, Otis Chandler and Philip Graham. Chandler and Graham considered sharing foreign correspondents, as both were expanding foreign coverage to compete with the New York Times; instead they decided to set up a joint news service.

Each newspaper had 50 percent ownership of the entity. Its stated emphasis was to provide coverage of international news with dispatches from the two papers, and the same for national news from Washington, D.C., in order to augment the coverage of more regionally-focused clients such as The Arizona Republic.

The sales forces of the two papers were sent to sign up clients; at first there were about 25 newspapers using the service. Rex Barley, manager of the Los Angeles Times Syndicate, was manager of the Times-Post service from its foundation until at least 1968.

== Use ==
Supplemental news services had great growth during 1960s and 1970s and by the end of the 1970s the Times-Post News Service had upwards of 200 clients. This was an era where newspapers were very profitable and were the key news source for most people. The growth of supplemental news sources continued even more so into the 1980s.

The Times-Post News Service was beneficial to many newspapers who had little or no national or international coverage. Indeed, some of its clients, such as New York World Journal Tribune, had no foreign correspondents at all and relied on the service for coverage of such matters. By 1992 the Times had 32 foreign correspondents and Post 25, second and third to The New York Times 37 but outweighing that number when combined. Subscribing clients also benefited from any investigative reporting that the two papers were doing, such as the Post's coverage of the Watergate scandal.

Among the columns syndicated by the service were ones by Jack Smith of the Times. At one point Leonard Downie Jr. was director of the service. Over time, the service also incorporated coverage by Newsday, The Baltimore Sun, and the Hartford Courant into what it put out. Pam Robinson worked for the service while based at Newsday and the Robinson Prize for copy editors is named for her.

By 1989 the service had 650 clients in the United States and around the world, with a total circulation of some 110 million. The number of clients was the most of any of the newspaper-based news services in the United States and ahead of rival supplemental news services New York Times News Service with 500 and the Scripps Howard News Service with 350 as the next two closest. The service is said to have sent out 125 stories each day comprising 100,000 words.

In addition to its regular service, Times–Post also offered a smaller service for a lesser price. The pair also started an all-sports service in 1984, which gained around 175 clients.

An additional benefit of the service to the two sponsoring papers was that it enhanced the reputation and lustre of the Times and the Post. A side effect of the service's success was that it harmed the fortunes of United Press International, since this was a less costly alternative for newspapers for improving coverage compared to subscribing to two full-fledged wire services.

The service picked up additional clients after the September 11 terrorist attacks, due to the surge in interest in foreign developments. By the late 2000s the service still had more than 600 clients.

== End ==
The service ended in 2009 when both partners decided to move in a different direction. Board vice chair Boisfeuillet Jones Jr. of the Post said, "As the news business and our newsrooms have evolved, the ways in which the organizations cover and distribute the news have changed. We felt at this time it made sense for us to proceed separately." Publisher Eddy Hartenstein of the Times said "after enjoying many years of great success together, we've agreed the time has come to move in separate directions."

The split was likely motivated by The Tribune Company's purchase of the Times in 2000, the recent effects of the Great Recession, and economic difficulties in general for the newspaper industry. Media writer Howard Kurtz wrote, "One of the oldest corporate marriages in the newspaper business ended in divorce [yesterday]." The Los Angeles Times joined McClatchy-Tribune, co-owned by parent company Tribune Company, while the Washington Post News Service began a partnership with Bloomberg News.

== See also ==
- Los Angeles Times Syndicate
- The Washington Post Writers Group
