= William Walsh =

William Walsh may refer to:

== Academia ==
- William Thomas Walsh (1891–1949), American historian
- W. H. Walsh (William Henry Walsh, 1913-1986), British philosopher and classicist
- William Walsh (educationist) (1916–1996), British educationist, literary scholar and acting vice-chancellor of the University of Leeds

== Politics and government ==
- William Walsh (Guildford MP), English landowner and MP for Guildford, 1417
- William Walsh (Worcestershire MP) (c. 1561–1622), English MP for Worcestershire, 1593
- William Henry Walsh (politician) (1823–1888), Queensland squatter and politician
- William Walsh (Maryland politician) (1828–1892), U.S. representative from Maryland
- William L. Walsh (1857–1938), Canadian lawyer and judge, lieutenant governor of Alberta
- William E. Walsh (Wisconsin tailor) (1869–1943), American tailor and Wisconsin state legislator
- William J. Walsh (politician) (1880–1948), Newfoundland politician
- William Allen Walsh (1887–1940), Canadian member of parliament
- William C. Walsh (1890–1975), American judge in Maryland
- William E. Walsh (Oregon politician) (1903–1975), member and president of the Oregon State Senate
- William F. Walsh (1912–2011), U.S. representative from New York
- William D. Walsh (1924–2003), American politician, member of the Illinois House of Representatives
- Joe Walsh (Illinois politician) (William Joseph Walsh, born 1961), U.S. representative from Illinois

== Religion ==
- William Walsh (bishop of Meath) (c. 1512–1577), Irish Roman Catholic bishop
- William Walsh (archbishop of Halifax) (1804–1858), Irish-born Canadian Roman Catholic archbishop
- William Horatio Walsh (1812–1882), English Anglican priest in Australia and England
- William Walsh (bishop of Ossory, Ferns and Leighlin) (1820–1902), Irish Anglican bishop and author
- William Walsh (bishop of Dover) (1836–1918), British Anglican bishop of Mauritius and later bishop of Dover
- William Walsh (archbishop of Dublin) (1841–1921), Irish Roman Catholic archbishop
- Willie Walsh (bishop) (William Walsh, born 1935), Irish Roman Catholic bishop of Killaloe

== Sports ==
- William A. Walsh (1871–1967), American football player
- Billy Walsh (polo) (William Francis Walsh, 1907–1992), British polo player
- Shawn Walsh (William Shawn Walsh, 1955–2001), American ice hockey coach

== Other ==
- William Walsh (Irish soldier) (fl. 1605–1616), Irish soldier and officer
- William Walsh (poet) (1662–1708), English poet and Whig politician, MP for Worcestershire
- William Walsh (piper) (1859–?), Irish/American piper and police officer
- William B. Walsh (1920–1996), American physician and founder of Project HOPE
- William G. Walsh (1922–1945), United States Marine and Medal of Honor recipient

== See also ==
- Bill Walsh (disambiguation)
- Billy Walsh (disambiguation)
- Willie Walsh (disambiguation)
- W. S. Pakenham-Walsh (1868–1960), British missionary to China and writer
- William Welsh (disambiguation)
