= Cleveland Athletic Club =

- U.S. Historic district – Contributing property
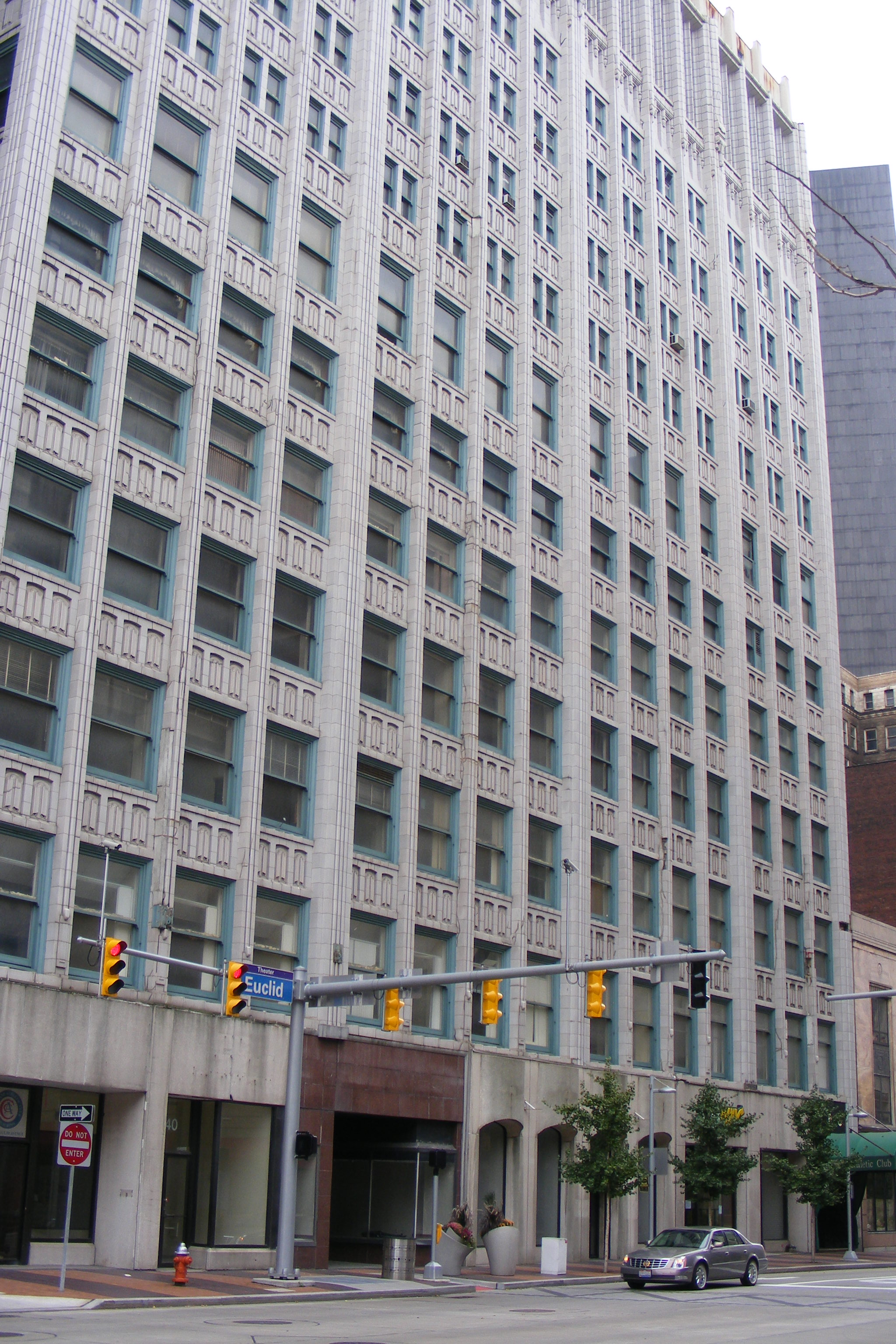

- Location within Ohio Location within the United States
- Location: 1118 Euclid Avenue, Cleveland, Ohio
- Coordinates: 41°30′00.7″N 81°41′04.9″W
- Built: 1911
- Architect: J. Milton Dyer
- Architectural style: Neoclassical
- Part of: Euclid Avenue Historic District (ID02000702)

The Cleveland Athletic Club (CAC) was a historic organization founded in 1908. Founding members included Mayor Charles A. Otis, Walter Baker, and Elbert Baker; banker William Parmalee Murray was its first president.

In 1911 the organization commissioned a 15-story social club building at 1118 Euclid Avenue, a structure with facilities for its boxing tournaments, office space, a 12-room hotel, a dining room, an eight-lane bowling alley, a basketball court, and many other amenities. Olympic and Hollywood swimmer Johnny Weissmueller broke the record for the 15-yard backstroke in the club's penthouse pool in 1922.

The architect was J. Milton Dyer, who also designed the Cleveland City Hall. Murals in the club were among the first commissions of American muralist William P. Welsh. The building is a contributing property to the city's Euclid Avenue Historic District on the National Register of Historic Places, and a part of the Nine-Twelve District as designated by the Downtown Cleveland Alliance.

The club was in financial difficulty in 2007. It closed its doors permanently on December 31, 2007, because of "sagging membership and financial problems".

In 2015, the building was sold for $3.3 million in a sheriff's sale, with announced plans for its conversion into a residential or mixed-use property. As of early 2020 the building had been extensively renovated into a luxury apartment building called "The Athlon".

Another, earlier Cleveland Athletic Club was established in 1890, with early baseball executive Frank Robison as its president. Despite an impressive new headquarters in the former Dodge mansion at 500 Euclid Avenue, and despite a large membership, it appears to have faded after 1895.

At present, the building that was once the Cleveland Athletic Club, is now known as the Athlon.
