= Leonard Downie Jr. =

American newspaper reporter and editor

- Downie Jr. in 2021
- Born: Cleveland, Ohio, U.S.
- Education: Ohio State University
- Occupations: Journalist, author, academic
- Known for: Executive editor of The Washington Post
- Children: 4
- Awards: Pulitzer Prize (25 times as executive editor)

Leonard "Len" Downie Jr. is an American journalist who was executive editor of The Washington Post from 1991 to 2008. He worked in the Post newsroom for 44 years. His roles at the newspaper included executive editor, managing editor, national editor, London correspondent, assistant managing editor for metropolitan news, deputy metropolitan editor, and investigative and local reporter. Downie became executive editor upon the retirement of Ben Bradlee. During Downie's tenure as executive editor, the Washington Post won 25 Pulitzer Prizes, more than any other newspaper had won during the term of a single executive editor. Downie currently serves as vice president at large at the Washington Post, as Weil Family Professor of Journalism at the Walter Cronkite School of Journalism and Mass Communication at Arizona State University, and as a member of several advisory boards associated with journalism and public affairs.

Downie is the author of six nonfiction books: All About the Story: News, Power, Politics, and the Washington Post (2020); The News Media: What Everyone Needs To Know (with C.W. Anderson and Michael Schudson, 2016); The News About the News (with Robert G. Kaiser, 2003); The New Muckrakers (1976); Mortgage on America (1974) and Justice Denied: The Case for Reform of the Courts (1971) The News About the News won the Goldsmith Award from the Joan Shorenstein Center at Harvard University’s John F. Kennedy School of Government.

Downie was also a major contributor to Ten Blocks from the White House: Anatomy of the Washington Riots of 1968 and has written many newspaper and magazine articles. He authored two major special reports for the Committee to Protect Journalists, The Trump Administration and the Press (2020) and The Obama Administration and the Press (2013) and co-authored The Reconstruction of American Journalism (2009), a major report on the state of the news media, published by the Columbia University Graduate School of Journalism. In 2009, Random House published his fiction debut, The Rules of the Game.

== Early life and education ==
Downie grew up in and around Cleveland, Ohio. He decided to become a journalist at the age of eleven and edited student newspapers at his elementary school and at Wilbur Wright Junior High School and John Marshall High School. He received his BA and MA degrees in journalism and political science from Ohio State University. While at Ohio State, he served as sports editor of the student newspaper The Lantern. During his tenure there he covered Ohio State football as well as the riots that surrounded the school's decision to turn down a bid to the 1962 Rose Bowl. In June 1993, he received an honorary Doctor of Humane Letters degree from Ohio State, in conjunction with his address during the university's commencement exercises. Downie has been married three times. He has four children and two stepchildren. His eldest son, David L. Downie, is a scholar of international environmental policy.

== Career ==
Downie first joined the Washington Post as a summer intern in 1964. He soon became a well-known local investigative reporter in Washington, specializing in crime, courts, housing and urban affairs. His 1966 investigative series on the malfunctioning local court system in Washington, D.C. helped lead to the system's abolition and replacement by the D.C. Superior Court. His reporting during his time on the metro staff won him two Washington-Baltimore Newspaper Guild Front Page awards, the American Bar Association Gavel Award for legal reporting, and the John Hancock Award for excellent business and financial writing. In 1971, he was awarded a two-year Alicia Patterson Journalism Fellowship to study urban problems in the United States and Europe.

Downie's first three books grew out of his newspaper journalism during those years. Justice Denied (Praeger, 1971) examined poorly functioning city courts across the country. Mortgage on America (Praeger, 1974) investigated the impact and costs of certain types of destructive urban real estate speculation. The New Muckrakers (New Republic Books, 1976) detailed the rise and impact of a new generation of investigative reporters, including his colleagues Bob Woodward and Carl Bernstein. Earlier, Downie had also been a major contributor to the book, Ten Blocks From the White House: Anatomy of the Washington Riots of 1968 (Praeger, 1968), drawing on his first hand reporting of the riots and their aftermath.

Downie worked on the Post's metropolitan staff as a reporter and editor for 15 years, and ran the staff as assistant managing editor for metropolitan news from 1974 until 1979. As deputy metropolitan editor, Downie supervised much of the Post's Watergate coverage. According to Bob Woodward's 2005 book The Secret Man, Downie was one of the few people to know the true identity of Watergate scandal informant Deep Throat before it was revealed to be Mark Felt.

Downie was named London correspondent in 1979 and worked in this capacity until mid-1982, covering the rise of Margaret Thatcher, the troubles in Northern Ireland, the royal wedding of Prince Charles and Princess Diana, and the Falklands War. He returned to Washington in 1982 as national editor. He became managing editor in 1984. He became executive editor in 1991, succeeding Benjamin Bradlee. As national editor, managing editor, and then executive editor, Downie personally oversaw the Washington Post's coverage of every national election from 1984 through 2008.

During his 17 years as executive editor, Downie led the newsroom to 25 Pulitzer Prizes, including three gold medals for public service. Downie's mantra—reflected in routine stories as well as such Pulitzer-winning efforts as the 2007 exposé of shoddy conditions at Walter Reed Army Medical Center—was "accountability journalism." After 44 years in the Post newsroom, Downie retired as executive editor in 2008. That year, the National Press Foundation named Downie the Benjamin Bradlee Editor of the Year.

In 2008, Downie was appointed as vice president at large of the Washington Post Co. In 2009, he became the Weil Family Professor of Journalism at the Walter Cronkite School of Journalism and Mass Communication at Arizona State University. Downie is also a founder and board member of Investigative Reporters and Editors, Inc (2009–present); a member of the Aspen Institute Commission to Reform the Federal Appointments Process; a former member of the board of directors of the Center for Investigative Reporting (2009–present); chair of the national advisory committee, Kaiser Health News (2009–present); an advisory board member of the Shirley Povich Center for Sports Journalism at the University of Maryland's Philip Merrill College of Journalism; and a director of the Los Angeles Times-Washington Post News Service.

In 2009, Random House published Downie's fictional debut, The Rules of the Game. Random House described the book as "a novel of corruption and cover-ups at the highest levels of Washington politics, as a national newspaper digs up the dark secrets of a powerful lobbying firm thereby exposing a network of wrongdoing by government contractors in Iraq that extends all the way to the White House."

In addition to his books, and publications in the Washington Post, Downie has written articles for a variety of publications, including the Columbia Journalism Review, The New Republic, and Washington Monthly. In 2009, Downie co-authored, with Columbia University Professor Michael Schudson, a major report on the state of the news media, "The Reconstruction of American Journalism," which was published by the Columbia University Graduate School of Journalism.

Downie has spoken at Oxford University, Columbia University, Duke University, Ohio State University, Harvard University, Stanford University, Fairfield University, Arizona State University, the University of Wisconsin, the University of Kentucky, Chautauqua, and for the American Society of Newspaper Editors, among others. He gave the Flinn Foundation Centennial Lecture at Arizona State University in October 2008, a keynote address at the Nieman Foundation Seventieth Anniversary Convocation at Harvard University in November 2008, and the keynote address at the 2009 graduation event of the Walter Cronkite School of Journalism and Mass Communication, a commencement address at Ohio State University, and the James Cameron Memorial Lecture at City University, London, among others. He has been interviewed frequently on network, cable, and local television, on national and local public radio, and by print reporters and academic researchers.

== Awards and honors ==
- Award for Editorial Leadership, American Society of News Editors, 2009.
- Ben Bradlee Editor of the Year Award, National Press Foundation, 2008.
- Goldsmith Award, Joan Shorenstein Center, John F. Kennedy School of Government, Harvard University, for The News About the News (with Robert G. Kaiser) 2003.
- Honorary Doctor of Humane Letters from The Ohio State University, 1993.
- Overseas Press Club Citation for Excellence for coverage of Britain.
- Gavel Award of the American Bar Association for coverage of the courts.
- John Hancock Award for Excellence in Business and Financial Journalism.
- Front Page Award, Washington-Baltimore Newspaper Guild.
- Alicia Patterson Journalism Fellowship.

== Selected publications ==
External videos
- Book party hosted by the Washington Post for The News About the News, February 22, 2002, C-SPAN
- Booknotes interview with Downie on The News About the News, April 7, 2002, C-SPAN
- Book party hosted by the Chautauqua Institution for The News About the News, July 25, 2002, C-SPAN

Books:

- All About the Story: News, Power, Politics, and the Washington Post, PublicAffairs, 2020.
- The News Media: What Everyone Needs To Know(with C.W. Anderson and Michael Schudson), Oxford University Press, 2016.
- The Rules of the Game (a novel), Alfred A. Knopf, 2009.
- The News About the News (with Robert G. Kaiser), Alfred A. Knopf, 2002; Vintage (paperback), 2003.
- The New Muckrakers, New Republic Books, 1976; Mentor (paperback), 1978.
- Mortgage on America, Frederick A. Praeger, 1974, (paperback) 1975.
- Justice Denied: The Case for Reform of the Courts, Frederick A. Praeger, 1971; Penguin (paperback), 1972.

Report:

- The Trump Administration and the Press (with research by Stephanie Sugars). A special report of the Committee to Protect Journalists, 2020
- The Obama Administration and the Press (with reporting by Sara Rafsky). A special report of the Committee to Protect Journalists, 2013.
- The Reconstruction of American Journalism (with Michael Schudson), Columbia University, 2009.

Contributor:

- Ten Blocks From the White House: Anatomy of the Washington Riots of 1968 (Ben Gilbert and the staff of The Washington Post), Frederick A. Praeger, 1968.
- Inside the System (Washington Monthly book edited by Charles Peters and John Rothchild), Frederick A. Praeger, 1973.

Articles:

- Various, including in the Columbia Journalism Review, The New Republic, Washington Monthly, and The Washington Post.

Preceded by Ben Bradlee	Executive Editor of The Washington Post; 1991-2008	Succeeded by Marcus Brauchli
