= Eleanor Gould Packard =

American grammarian (1917–2005)

Eleanor Lois Gould Packard (1917–2005) was The New Yorker's copy editor and grammarian. During her employment, she was responsible for the precision and consistency of language in the magazine.

== Personal life ==
Eleanor Gould was born in Newark, New York, on October 3, 1917. When she was very young, her parents, Eleanor Loveland Gould and lawyer Wilson Mosher Gould, moved to Ohio. Growing up, Gould quickly discovered her passion for the English language and her love of reading. She read multiple books each day and worked hard to excel at school. Her self-described "retentive memory" served her well; she would go on to graduate from high school in three and a half years, attaining the "highest average in the history of the school." She was awarded a scholarship to Oberlin College as an English major, where she would graduate summa cum laude in 1938.

In 1939, Gould moved to Manhattan, New York City. She worked in several low-paying editing jobs before she decided to apply to The New Yorker. In her application, she mentioned two errors that she had found in a new issue of The New Yorker, citing her ability to fix them as a reason to hire her. Her qualifications and this exemplification of her skills got her hired directly following her interview. She became copy editor for The New Yorker in 1945. There, she came to be known by most as "Miss Gould."

Shortly after her hire, Gould developed a romantic relationship with coworker Frederick "Freddie" Packard, head of the fact-checking department. The couple married in 1946. A year later, she gave birth to their daughter, Susan Hathaway Packard. The Packard family enjoyed traveling to faraway places, making regular trips to France, Scotland, Ireland, and Morocco. Later, Eleanor and Susan even took a trip to Antarctica.

Gould suddenly became deaf in 1990. In her deafness her voice changed; it now had a higher pitch and was described as "birdlike." Gould could no longer deeply enjoy her favorite performances: concerts and ballet. She suffered a stroke in 1999 and abruptly retired (she had originally planned to retire in 2000). She trained several staff members to continue her work in her absence. She occasionally expressed a desire to go back to work. She died in 2005 at the age of 87. Her family did not disclose the cause of death.

== Career at The New Yorker ==
Gould began her career as a copy editor for The New Yorker on November 5, 1945. She edited for poetry, fiction, and nonfiction writings. After ten years, she transitioned to editing mainly nonfiction. It has been suggested that her strict, logic-based approach to editing was sometimes unhelpful in the realm of poetry and fiction.

Gould was indispensable to The New Yorker, where the title “Grammarian” was coined in her honor. She strove for a clarity and precision that would make each article read smoothly. Her understanding of grammar went far past that of many colleagues. She always considered the larger form of an article. A piece she marked up and returned with feedback was called a “Gould-proof” and often contained phrases like “How so?" “This Clear? (not to me)” “NOT Grammar!” and “Have we completely lost our mind?”. She said her work was like cleaning a room: “I just try to make things right.” Peers knew Gould to be meticulous and hardworking. It was not uncommon for her to remark on several errors in the smallest of sentences; she is said to have found four errors in a sentence composed of only three words.

It is said by many of The New Yorker staff that Gould had as significant a role as many of the most notable authors and editors in house. She looked over nearly every one of the thousands of articles the magazine wrote in her time there. In her 54 years on staff she rarely took days off. She spent long hours in her office working without distraction. Even after she became deaf, Gould continued her work as The New Yorker's only grammarian, though she now communicated with the authors by written note.

E.B. White said that he was quite grateful to have Gould's assistance in revising The Elements of Style, Her edits can be seen in nonfiction works by White, Roger Angell, Wolcott Gibbs, Ved Mehta, Pauline Kael, Philip Hamburger, John McPhee, and Lillian Ross.
