= New York World Journal Tribune =

Defunct New York City daily evening broadsheet newspaper created by mergers

- The inaugural issue of World Journal Tribune (Vol. 1, No. 1, September 12, 1966)
- Type: Evening daily newspaper
- Format: Broadsheet
- Owner(s): World Journal Tribune, Inc. (40% Hearst Corp., 30% Scripps, 30% J.H. Whitney)
- Publisher: Matt Meyer
- Editor: Frank Coniff
- Founded: September 12, 1966
- Ceased publication: May 5, 1967
- Language: English
- Headquarters: Manhattan, New York City

The New York World Journal Tribune (WJT) was an evening daily newspaper published in New York City from September 1966 until May 1967. The World Journal Tribune represented an attempt to save the heritages of several historic New York City newspapers by merging the city's three mid-market papers (the Journal-American, the World-Telegram and Sun and the Herald Tribune) together into a consolidated newspaper.

== Background ==
The late 1940s through the 1950s were a troubled time for newspapers throughout North America. Newspapers had acquired a major new competitor for the news audience in television, adding to the competition already ongoing from radio and magazines. in particular, the market for evening papers was affected by television news, but all papers were affected by it to some extent. The New York media market was by far America's largest at the time (by an even larger margin than it is currently) and had the most daily newspapers. Mergers between them had been ongoing for several years.

In the 1960s the market became even more competitive, forcing the closure of the Hearst-owned New York Daily Mirror in 1963. The newspaper industry was struggling financially by the mid-1960s, and had warned their unions, some of the more militant in the city at the time, that they could not survive yet another strike following devastating walk-outs in 1962–1963 and 1965.

== Merger ==
In April 1966, in an attempt to avoid closing down, the Scripps-Howard owned New York World-Telegram and Sun merged with Hearst's New York Journal-American and the New York Herald Tribune to become the New York World Journal Tribune, an evening broadsheet newspaper which would rely on newsstand sales to survive.

The management of the merged paper told their employees that to succeed the new enterprise would need concessions from the unions, but the unions, upset that several thousand workers were planned to be laid-off, demanded their own concessions from management. The result of the impasse was a 140-day strike which delayed the debut of the new paper until September 12, 1966.

== Closing ==
The World Journal Tribune never became economically viable, and it ceased publication eight months later, on May 5, 1967. During its short life, the paper never opened a Washington bureau, and did not have any foreign correspondents on its staff, relying instead on the Los Angeles Times–Washington Post News Service for foreign coverage.

The folding of the WJT left The New York Times, the New York Daily News, and the New York Post as the only daily English-language general circulation newspapers in New York City for many years, when in 1900 there had been fifteen. The end of World Journal Tribune represented the end also of all the predecessor newspapers that had previously been absorbed by the three papers that merged, including the Advertiser (the oldest of the predecessors, founded in 1793), the American, the Evening Telegram, the Herald, the Journal, the Press, the Sun, Tribune and the World.

One survivor of the demise of the World Journal Tribune was New York magazine, which began as the Sunday supplement for the Herald Tribune and continued after the merger as the supplement for the WJT. After the newspaper folded, Clay Felker, the editor of New York, bought the rights to the title with partners and brought it out as a glossy magazine.

== See also ==
- Journalism
- Newspaper
- Joint operating agreement (JOA)
