= Bill Walsh (author) =

American copy editor

William F. Walsh (December 20, 1961 – March 15, 2017) was a copy editor at The Washington Post. He spoke on copy editing and was a regular presenter at annual conferences of the American Copy Editors Society. His books include Lapsing into a Comma (2000); The Elephants of Style (2004); and Yes, I Could Care Less (2013).

Walsh also worked on the Slot, a website for copy editors that he founded in August 1995.

== Personal ==
Walsh was born in Pottsville, Pennsylvania, and raised in Madison Heights, Michigan, and Mesa, Arizona. He obtained his degree in journalism from the University of Arizona in 1984. Upon graduating, he began working as a reporter and editor for the Phoenix Gazette. He also worked for The Washington Times and The Washington Post as an editor.

Walsh died in Arlington, Virginia, on March 15, 2017, after a bout with bile-duct cancer.
