= William G. Connolly =

American journalist (1937–2023)

William Connolly
- Born: William Gerard Connolly; October 12, 1937; Scranton, Pennsylvania, U.S.
- Died: December 12, 2023 (aged 86); Maplewood, New Jersey, U.S.
- Education: University of Scranton (BA); Columbia University Graduate School of Journalism (MS)
- Occupation: Copy editor
- Spouse: Clair Connor (m. 1964; died 2013)
- Children: 3

William Gerard Connolly (October 12, 1937 – December 12, 2023) was an American newspaper editor who worked at The New York Times across four decades. He co-authored The New York Times Manual of Style and Usage and was a member of the executive committee of the American Copy Editors Society.

== Education ==
Born in Scranton, Pennsylvania on October 12, 1937, William Gerard Connolly attended St. Paul's School, and graduated from the Scranton Preparatory School in 1955 and the University of Scranton in 1959, with a degree in philosophy and English. Following his service in the U.S. Army (1959–1962), in 1963 he earned a master's degree from the Graduate School of Journalism at Columbia University.

== Career ==
Connolly began his career at The Minneapolis Tribune, The Houston Chronicle, and The Detroit Free Press as a reporter and editor. However, he spent most of his career at The New York Times. He joined the paper in 1966, working as a copy editor on the foreign news desk. He later served as copy editor on the New York Times Magazine and assistant real estate editor. In 1975, he joined the national news staff. He and Allan M. Siegal wrote several revisions of the newspaper's style guide. In 1979, he left the Times to become managing editor of The Virginian-Pilot, but returned to New York within a few years. He retired in 2001.

Connolly was active in promoting racial and ethnic diversity in journalism and supporting student journalism and mentoring with the Maynard Institute for Journalism Education. He lectured several times at the American Press Institute. From 1981 to 2001, he taught courses at the Maynard Institute's editing program, University of Arizona, and the University of California, Berkeley. Connolly was president of the American Copy Editors Society's Education Fund from 2005 to 2010, and served on its board until 2023.

== Personal life and death ==
Connolly married Clair Connor in 1964; they had three children and were married until her death in 2013. Connolly died at a rehabilitation facility in Maplewood, New Jersey, on December 12, 2023, from complications of a fall. He was 86.

== Works ==
Connolly also wrote The New York Times Guide to Buying or Building a Home. From 1987 to 1989, he wrote "Winners & Sinners," a critique of a paper that was read by journalists, writers, and educators.
