= Allan M. Siegal =

American journalist (1940–2022)

- Born: Allan Marshall Siegal; May 1, 1940; New York City, U.S.
- Died: September 21, 2022 (aged 82); New York City, U.S.
- Education: New York University
- Occupations: Editor; journalist
- Years active: 1960–2006
- Employers: The New York Times (1960–1965; 1967–2006); ABC News (1966)
- Spouse: Gretchen Leefmans (m. 1977)
- Children: 2

Allan Marshall Siegal (May 1, 1940 – September 21, 2022) was an American newspaper editor and journalist who worked at The New York Times for 45 years. In 1987, he was named an assistant managing editor, and in 2003, he became the Times' first standards editor, charged with maintaining high standards of accuracy, fairness and ethical conduct.

== Early life ==
Siegal was born in the Bronx on May 1, 1940. His father, Irving, immigrated from Poland during his teenage years and managed a seltzer delivery company before becoming a landlord; his mother, Sylvia (Wrubel), was a housewife. Siegal attended Christopher Columbus High School in his home borough's Pelham Parkway neighborhood, where he served as editor of the school newspaper. He was then awarded a scholarship to study journalism at New York University.

== Career ==
While he was still in university, Siegal joined The New York Times in 1960 as a copy boy. He eventually worked his way up to becoming a copy editor. During the 1960s, he briefly worked at ABC News (under the aegis of Peter Jennings) in 1966 but soon returned to the Times. He also had a stint as a reporter, but realized he preferred editing, and successfully lobbied to return to an editing position. He first worked on the foreign desk and later as the head of the news desk. Siegal was part of the team that turned the Pentagon Papers into news. In 1986, he became an assistant managing editor. Siegal was the lead editor of the newspaper's investigation of Jayson Blair.

Siegal served as the in-house authority on language, style, taste, professional ethics and practical newspapering. He co-authored the New York Times' stylebook and its ethics manual along with designing the first computer system in the newsroom. His last post at the Times was as assistant managing editor and standards editor, a position that he was the inaugural holder of from its creation in 2003. His responsibilities in that capacity included maintaining the newspaper's ethics, accuracy, fairness, and accountability. He retired in 2006.

== Personal life ==
Siegal married Gretchen Leefmans in 1977. She worked as a freelance manuscript editor at the time, and they remained together until his death. Together, they had two children.

Siegal died on September 21, 2022, at his home in Manhattan. He was 82 and had suffered from heart issues.

== Bibliography ==
- With William G. Connolly. The New York Times Manual of Style and Usage, Revised and Expanded Edition. New York: Three Rivers Press, 2002. ISBN 0-8129-6389-X ISBN 978-0-8129-6389-2

== See also ==
- List of American copy editors
