= Robinson Prize =

Annual award for excellence in copy editing

The Robinson Prize is one of two awards given out by ACES: The Society for Editing annually to one copy editor whose work demonstrates exceptional effectiveness.

== History ==
Established in 2005, the prize is named for Pam Robinson, formerly a news editor at the Los Angeles Times-Washington Post News Service in suburban New York. Robinson was the co-founder of ACES in 1997 and the society's first president.

== Evaluation ==
Nominees are evaluated on a combination of elements, which include editing, design, mentoring and training, fostering a sense of teamwork and pride among colleagues, and anything else that furthers the role of the editing profession. Says Teresa Schmedding, one of the drafters of the award, and a member of the Society's Executive Committee,

This award isn't designed to applaud the best speller in the newsroom or the best grammarian. Being a good wordsmith isn't enough. Today's copy editors need to be skilled in conflict resolution, show excellent news judgment, demonstrate initiative and be able to find creative solutions to help their papers succeed in this era filled with increased competition.

== Eligibility ==
The contest is open to all copy editors working for English-language news publications, though work considered for nomination must be current. Members of the Society's Executive Committee, employees, and the administrators of the contest are ineligible.

== Winners ==
Winners of the Prize, in addition to recognition, receive $2,000.

- 2005: Paul Soucy, USA Today
- 2006: Tim Lynch, Los Angeles Times
- 2007: Adam Smith, The Augusta Chronicle
- 2008: Michael Roehrman, The Wichita Eagle
- 2009: Beth Blair, Boy Scouts of America
- 2010: Andy Angelo, The Grand Rapids (Mich.) Press
- 2011: Kim Profant, Chicago Tribune
- 2012: Doris Truong, Washington Post
- 2013: Katharine O'Moore-Klopf, medical editor for ACES, American Medical Writers Association, Board of Editors in the Life Sciences, Editorial Freelancers Association etc.; Copyeditors Knowledge Base online
- 2014: Larissa Newton, Central Penn Business Journal
- 2015: Sarah Grey, Grey Editing
- 2016: Karen Yin, Conscious Style Guide
- 2018: Karen S. Conlin, Grammargeddon
- 2019: Rob Reinalda, Ragan Communications
- 2020: Laura Poole, Archer Editorial Services
- 2021: Emily Ayubi, APA Style
- 2022: Talysa Sainz
- 2023: Lily Thomas, Washington Post
- 2024: Erin Brenner, Right Touch Editing
- 2025: Jamaal D. Pittman, Capital Group
- 2026: Nadia Geagea Pupa, Pique Publishing
