= Willie Walsh =

Willie Walsh may refer to:

- Willie Walsh (bishop) (1935–2025), Irish Roman Catholic prelate, Bishop of Killaloe
- William Matthew Walsh (born 1961), Irish businessman and director general of the International Air Transport Association (IATA)
- Willie Walsh (hurler, born 1888) (1888–1964), Irish hurler with Sarsfields and Cork
- Willie Walsh (hurler, born 1938), Irish hurler with St Finbarr's and Cork
- Willie Walsh (hurler, born 1948), Irish hurler with Youghal and Cork

== See also ==
- William Walsh (disambiguation)
