= William P. Welsh =

American painter

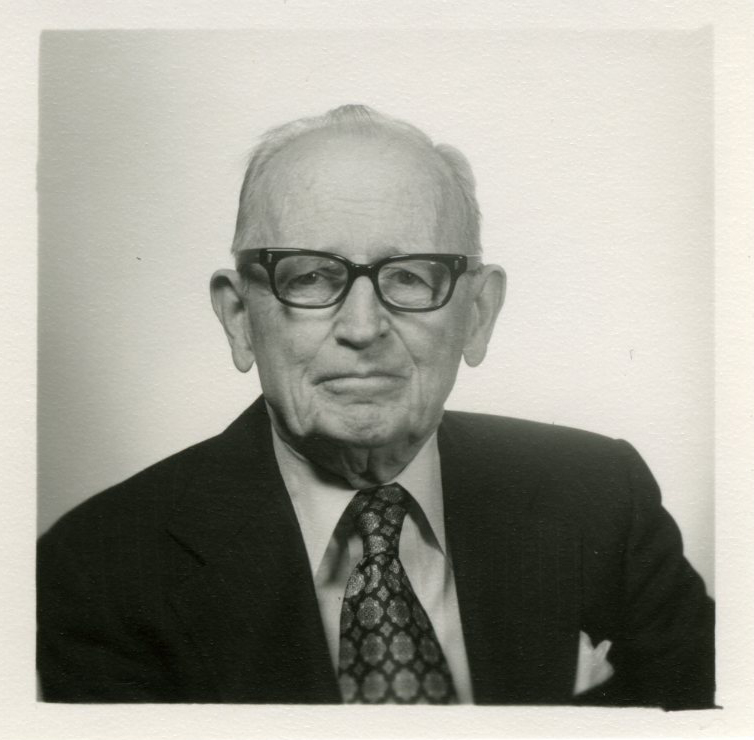
- William Welsh in a suit in his middle age
- Born: September 20, 1889; Lexington, Kentucky
- Died: March 9, 1984 (aged 94); Lexington, Kentucky
- Occupations: Artist; Soldier

William Peter Welsh (1889–1984) was a muralist, portrait painter, and illustrator from Kentucky as well as a soldier who served in both world wars and in the Mexican Border campaign with General Pershing in 1916. He died at age 95 in his hometown of Lexington, Kentucky. His mural painting Lexington Street Scene, October 1793 was at the Kentuckian Hotel on High Street and was recreated by the artist after its destruction and displayed at Hymon's Department store with prints also sold. His painting "Prisoner of War" is part of the Art Institute of Chicago's collection. He also painted murals for the Chicago Room of Palmer House and did a series of European style poster advertisements for Pullman sleeping cars. He won awards and recognition for the campaign. He worked in Illinois. His work was also part of the painting event in the art competition at the 1936 Summer Olympics.

== Early life and education ==
William Peter Welsh was born to Bartholomew J. Welsh and Sara Ellen Cunningham King Welsh in Lexington, Kentucky. He was one of six children, four boys and two girls: an older brother, King; a sister, Agatha; Welsh; twins Barry and August (Gus); and Marguerite.

Welsh attended Saint Paul's, a boys-only school taught by nuns. School for him started at 7:30 a.m. and he attended Mass each day before class.

Welsh's father, Bartholomew, died of cancer following a three-year bout with an aneurysm that finally burst. Welsh was three years old, when his father developed the aneurysm. After his father's death, his mother Sara supported the children by living in boarding homes that belonged to relatives and friends so she could work and earn money.

Welsh took his first job, a summer position at the Lexington Leader, at age 12 making $2 a week. His boss, Sam Roberts, fired him after the summer so he could return to school. At age 14, he started working at the Kaufman Clothing Company in Lexington where he was soon promoted and made $3 a week, and later $6. His boss at this store, Phil Strauss, would prove influential in his success as an artist.

== Ella Williams School for Girls ==
When Welsh was 15, he began studying under Mary Kinkead, his first painting teacher, at the Ella Williams School for Girls in Lexington. He was one of only a few boys who attended. It was here that he met Henrietta Clay. They were later sweethearts and engaged. After Clay ended their engagement for another man, they remained good friends. In his oral history account, Welsh credited his time at Ella Williams studying under Kinkead as what would inspire him to travel abroad and study art.

== Academie Julien and Atelier Delecleuse in Paris ==
Welsh got into Academie Julien and Atelier Delecleuse in Paris, France thanks to a connection of his Lexington art teacher, Mary Kinkead. His boss at the Kaufman Clothing Company, Phil Strauss, funded Welsh's time in Paris with a monthly check of $40 because he trusted Mart Kinkead's judgement that Welsh was suited for Paris. After he returned from Europe, he spent two years in Lexington doing odd art jobs and sports activities at a YMCA. He then went to New York to pursue art. He had a promise of $25 a week in New York for working in George Ford Morris's studio (Morris was a New York horse painter). While in New York, he worked and attended the Arts Student League.

== Military service ==
Welsh first enlisted in the Army in 1914 at the First New York Field Artillery, Battery B as a private despite only have one good eye (his left). His first field experience was in 1916 during his time serving with General Pershing in the Mexican Border Campaign in search of Pancho Villa. He never encountered Villa. After his Mexican Border tour of duty, he went overseas with his regiment and served in Brittany, Brest. Here his French language skills, acquired during his art school days in Paris, made him invaluable to his regiment. After Brest, he was shipped to Bordeaux to a camp called Desseus. Soon after, his French language skills grabbed the attention of his superiors, along with his artistic training, and he was transferred to Langres, where he worked with a camouflage unit. Later, during the second world war, Welsh joined again, this time at age 52. He again worked in camouflage, this time in charge of a St. Louis unit for a short time. He was later an executive officer in the same unit to his replacement officer, a younger man named Austin who was 35 and sent from Washington to replace Welsh.

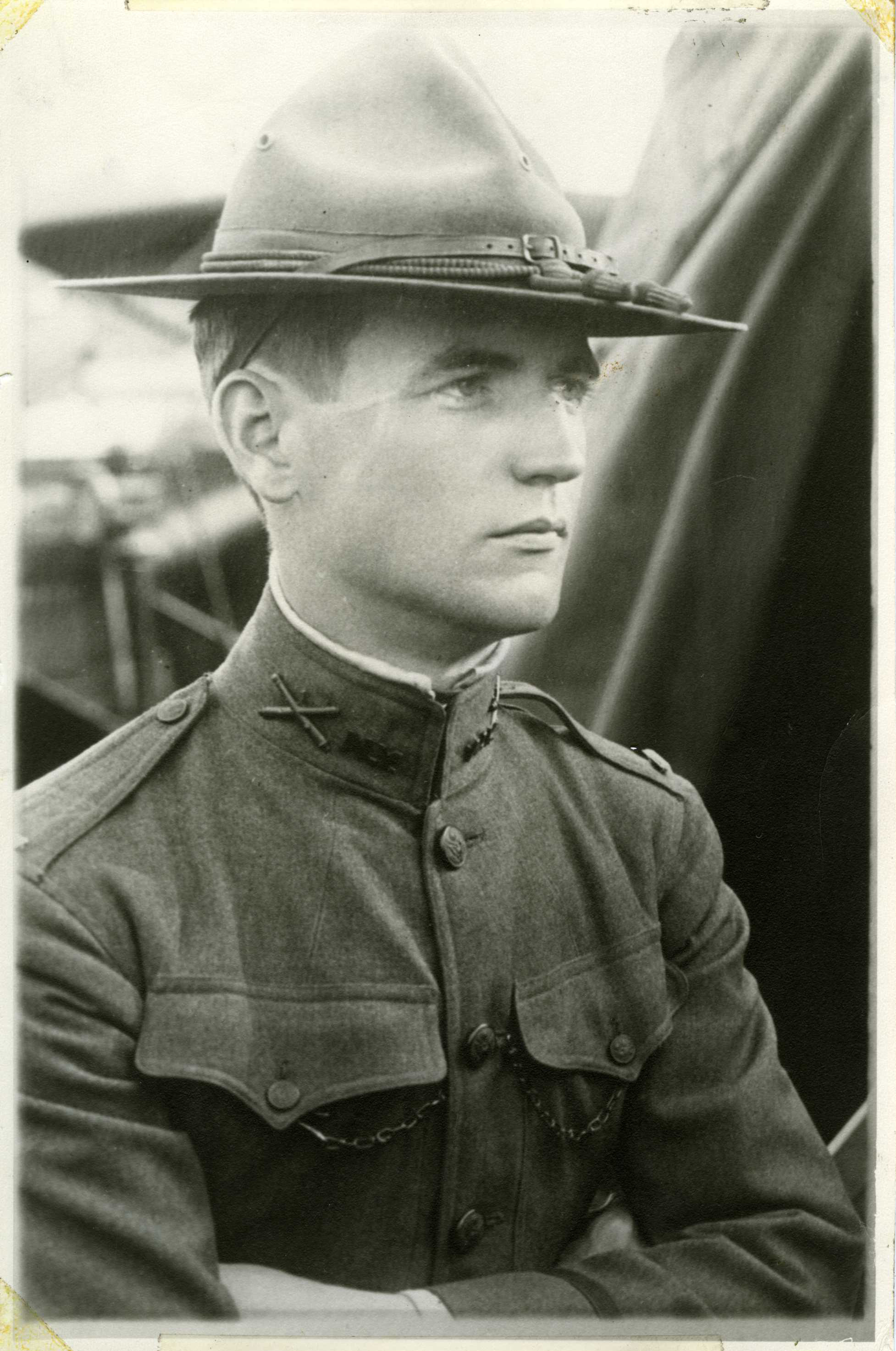
A young William Welsh in uniform during World War I

== Japan ==
During World War II, while in his 50s, Welsh received a commission to use his art skills to document the war. Welsh landed in Japan in October 1945 and left in July 1946 after the military requested that he go overseas and paint and draw images for historical war records. He chose the Japanese theater and spent ten months drawing and painting the destruction and beauty he found in the country. He completed ten paintings while there. He would later give presentations and speeches about his time in Japan to various clubs in Kentucky. Pictures of his Japanese paintings appeared in newspapers across several states such as the Louisville Courier-Journal, the Chicago Tribune, the Lexington Herald-Leader, and others.

== Military awards ==
- American Campaign Medal
- Asiatic Pacific Campaign Medal
- World War I Victory Medal with Star
- World War II Victory Medal
- Mexican Border Ribbon
- Personal Commendation (Hoyt. S. Vandenberg, Chief of Staff, United States Air Force, 1953).

== The Lexington Street Scene ==
Among Welsh's most notable work was his "Lexington Street Scene", a 24-foot-long, 6-foot-high mural that was thought to have been destroyed during the demolition of the Kentuckian Hotel. He re-painted his famous mural in 1975. Members of The Welsh Society rediscovered the original mural in 1981.

== Family and personal life ==
Welsh was born into a Catholic family, but never took religion seriously. By the time his oral history was published in 1982, he said he neither believed in life after death nor eternal punishment and reward. He said he lived by no philosophy or religion, thinking both to be "utter nonsense" and said what got him through life was his ability and passion to paint.

== Other honors and awards ==
- 1910–1913—Cleveland Murals at the Cleveland Athletic Club, Berghoff Rathskellar, and the Hotel Statler
- 1921—First prize in the International Watercolor Exhibition in Chicago
- 1930–31—Art Directors Club medal in New York City.
- 1936—Barron Collier Medal for Advertising Art.
- 1936–37—Award of Merit, Chicago Society of Typographic Art.
- 1938—First and Third prizes for Century of Progress poster Competition in Chicago.
- 1942—Commissioned Captain in the Army Air Force.
- 1943—Commissioned Major in the Army Air Force. Developed and directed the training for the camouflage operations in the Pacific Theater of War in the Army Air Force.
- 1946—Commissioned Lieutenant Colonel.
- 1949—Margaret Cooper Prize from the Allied Artists of America
- 1950—Popular Vote Prize from the Artists Along the Mississippi Exhibition.
- 1950—Elected to the Royal Society of Arts in London. As of 1982, he was thought to be the only living American Fellow in this society.

== Life timeline ==
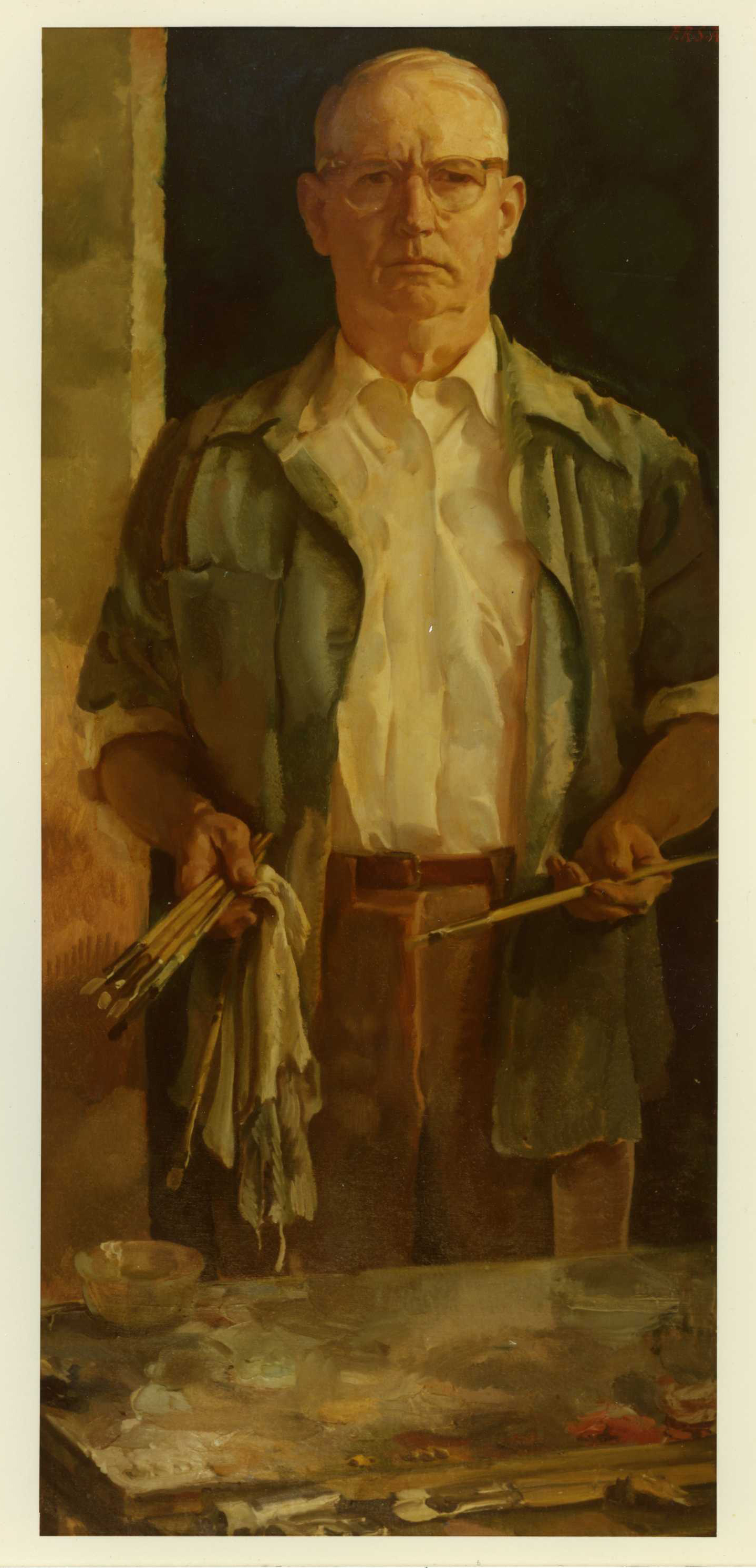
William Welsh's self-portrait

- 1889—born on September 20, to Bartholomew J. Welsh and Sara Ellen Cunningham King Welsh in Lexington, Kentucky
- 1904—Studied drawing and painting at the Ella Williams School in Lexington under Mary Kinkead, a former student of Frank Duveneck
- 1906–07—Student, Academie Julien and Atelier Delecleuse in Paris
- 1909–1910—Student at Art Students League in New York under Vincent Dumond
- 1910–1913—Cleveland Murals at the Cleveland Athletic Club, Berghoff Rathskellar, and the Hotel Statler
- 1914—Entered the Army in the First New York Field Artillery as a private
- 1915—Commissioned as a second lieutenant in the Army
- 1916—Mexican Border campaign with General Pershing
- 1917—Commissioned as a first lieutenant in the Army
- 1918—American Expeditionary Forces, Langres, St. Mihiel, decorated
- 1919—Established the College of Fine and Applied Arts at the American Expeditionary Forces University, Beaune, Côte d'Or, France, where he met Marie Prieur
- 1919–42—Established himself in Chicago as an illustrator for The Woman's Home Companion, Good Housekeeping, Hearst International, and Cosmopolitan Cosmopolitan magazines. During this time he also became noted for his advertising and his portraiture
- 1921—First prize in the International Watercolor Exhibition in Chicago
- 1924—Murals for the Chicago Room, The Palmer House, Chicago
- 1930–31—Art Directors Club medal in New York City
- 1936—Barron Collier Medal for Advertising Art
- 1936–37—Award of Merit, Chicago Society of Typographic Art
- 1938—First and Third prizes for Century of Progress poster Competition in Chicago
- 1940—Completed "The Fat Lady", considered to be his best work
- 1942—Commissioned Captain in the Army Air Force
- 1943—Commissioned Major in the Army Air Force; developed and directed the training for the camouflage operations in the Pacific Theater of War in the Army Air Force
- 1945–46—Recorded events in the Philippines and postwar Japan in art media for the Historical Records office in the Army Air Force
- 1946—Commissioned Lieutenant Colonel
- 1948—Returned to Lexington, Kentucky to devote himself to portraiture and teaching
- 1949—Margaret Cooper Prize from the Allied Artists of America
- 1950—Popular Vote Prize from the Artists Along the Mississippi Exhibition
- 1950—Elected to the Royal Society of Arts in London; as of 1982, he was thought to be the only living American Fellow in this society
- 1956—One Man Exhibition, Speed Art Museum in Louisville
- 1960–1974—Taught classes in portrait painting in Louisville
- 1978—Welsh's friends founded the William P. Welsh Society
- 1980—One Man Exhibit at the United States Military Academy at West Point
- 1981—Only living artist represented in the retrospective exhibition, "Kentucky Painter: From the Frontier Era to the Great War" at the University of Kentucky Fine Arts Museum
- 1984—death
