= William Welch (designer) =

English Industrial Designer

William Welch FCSD FRSA
- Born: 2 April 1972 (age 54)
- Education: Royal College of Art
- Occupations: Industrial designer and CEO of Studio William Welch Ltd
- Years active: 2005 - Present
- Spouse: Frances Bull (m. ? - Present)

William Leonard Welch (born 2 April 1972) is an English Industrial designer. William is the son of the late post-war Industrial Designer Robert Radford Welch (21 May 1929 – 15 March 2000). In 2004 Welch became a Fellow of Chartered Society of Designs. In 2007 Welch was invited to become Fellow of The Royal Society of Arts and as a Freeman, holds a key to the city of London.

== Early life and training ==
William Welch was born in Leamington Spa and raised in nearby Stratford-upon-Avon, Warwickshire. From 1995, he studied design at the University of Central England (now Birmingham City University) where he completed courses in Furniture Design and Silversmithing, before going on to complete his Master of Arts Degree at The Royal College of Art, London in 2001.

(1995–1997) Welch also worked for Pentagram Design London as a junior designer under practice partner Kenneth Grange, and later worked in the same design consultancy for Daniel Wiel (1997–1999).

Through completing a research and development project, designing for people with physical disabilities at The Helen Hamlyn Centre for Design, Welch created cutlery for people with physical disabilities called "Adaptable Cutlery", which changed shape to accommodate the user’s physical abilities. This gained the graduating year’s top Helen Hamlyn Award for Design in 2001, The Lord Snowdon Award. The Adaptable Cutlery was also a category award winner for the Peugeot/Oxo Design Awards in 2002, and was crowned overall winner of all ten design categories, securing prize money of £16,000.

(2001–2005) Following the death of his father, William was appointed Company Director at Robert Welch Designs Ltd. Employed as a Design Director, William worked alongside his brother Rupert, until breaking away from the company and launching Studio William Cutlery in 2005.

== Silversmithing ==
Welch worked as an apprentice at his late father’s studio and workshop, studying design and silversmithing under his father and also Silversmith and model maker John Limbery. Welch completed his Silversmithing training focusing his Master of Arts Degree towards mass-production and industrial design at The Royal College of Art, London.
