= The New York Times Manual of Style and Usage =

Style guide used by The New York Times

- The New York Times Manual of Style and Usage, 2015 edition
- Editor: The New York Times Editors (1851–1949); Robert E. Garst (1950–1956); Lewis Jordan (1962–1972); Allan M. Siegal and William G. Connolly (1999–2002); Philip B. Corbett, Jill Taylor, Patrick LaForge, and Susan Wessling (2015)
- Author: The New York Times Editors
- Cover artist: Mimi Park
- Language: English
- Subject: Style guide
- Genre: Journalism reference
- Publisher: Three Rivers Press
- Publication date: 1950 (first edition); revised 1974, 1999, 2002, 2015
- Publication place: United States
- Media type: Print (paperback), digital
- ISBN: 978-1101905449

The New York Times Manual of Style and Usage is a style guide to American English grammar and journalistic writing, developed by editors and journalists of The New York Times. It provides detailed guidelines for writing and editing across the newspaper's publications.

First compiled in 1895, the manual has been regularly updated, with the most recent public edition released in 2015.

== History ==
The New York Times was established as the New-York Daily Times in 1851. To ensure consistency among reporters, a style guide was created in 1895.

In 1928, the guide was distributed as a 70-page pamphlet, and by 1937 it had expanded to a 99-page booklet.

The first hardcover edition appeared in 1950 under the title Style Book of The New York Times, edited and revised by editor Robert E. Garst. This edition was reprinted in 1956.

In 1962, Lewis Jordan, then news editor of The New York Times, reorganized the guide into The New York Times Style Book for Writers and Editors, presenting it as an alphabetical reference. This format has since influenced much of the wider journalism industry. Jordan's 1972 revision gave the guide its modern name.

Further revisions were made in 1999 by Allan M. Siegal and William G. Connolly, expanding the guide to 365 pages. This edition disavowed racial slurs and encouraged the use of respectful language for all groups. Placeholder names in examples, previously standardized as John Manley, were updated to reflect diverse surnames. Siegal and Connolly also contributed to the 2002 edition.

The online version of the style guide, the New York Times Stylebook, became available in 1999 for use by Times writers and editors.

The 2015 edition of The New York Times Manual of Style and Usage was revised and updated by Philip B. Corbett, senior editor and overseer of the stylebook, with assistance from Jill Taylor, Patrick LaForge, and Susan Wessling.

== Style ==
The New York Times Manual has various differences from the more influential Associated Press Stylebook. For example, in The New York Times style:

- Uses 's for possessives, regardless of whether the word or name ends in s.
- Gives rationales for many practices for which the AP simply states a rule.
- Is strictly alphabetical and thus self-indexed, while the AP has separate sections for sports and weather entries, and combines many entries under such terms as weapons.
- Has some whimsical entries – such as one for how to spell shh – in contrast to the AP's drier, more utilitarian format, though it is not alone in its tone among journalistic style guides.
- Requires that the surnames of subjects be prefixed with a courtesy title (such as Dr., Mr., Ms., or Mrs.). Since about 2015, courtesy titles have not been used in sports pages, pop culture, or fine arts. After the first use of honorifics denoting posts (such as President or Professor, but not Dr.) in an article, the person is subsequently referred to by an egalitarian courtesy title (e.g. President Biden then Mr. Biden).
- Uses its own style for abbreviations rather than deferring to common usage; for example, the National Football League is abbreviated NFL in most sources but N.F.L. in The New York Times.
