= Third Watch =

American crime drama series (1999–2005)

- Genre: Crime drama; Police procedural
- Created by: John Wells; Edward Allen Bernero
- Starring: Michael Beach; Coby Bell; Bobby Cannavale; Eddie Cibrian; Molly Price; Kim Raver; Anthony Ruivivar; Skipp Sudduth; Jason Wiles; Amy Carlson; Chris Bauer; Tia Texada; Nia Long; Bonnie Dennison; Cara Buono; Josh Stewart
- Opening theme: "Keep Hope Alive" by The Crystal Method (Note: In "Welcome to Camelot", the opening theme is an instrumental version of "Right Here, Right Now" by Fatboy Slim.)
- Country of origin: United States
- Original language: English
- No. of seasons: 6
- No. of episodes: 132 (list of episodes)

Production
- Executive producers: Christopher Chulack; John Wells; Edward Allen Bernero; John Romano; Brooke Kennedy; Jorge Zamacona
- Camera setup: Single-camera
- Running time: 43–44 minutes
- Production companies: John Wells Productions; Warner Bros. Television

Original release
- Network: NBC
- Release: September 23, 1999 – May 6, 2005

Related
- ER; Medical Investigation

Third Watch is an American crime drama television series created by John Wells and Edward Allen Bernero that aired on NBC from September 23, 1999, to May 6, 2005, with a total of 132 episodes spanning over six seasons. It was produced by John Wells Productions, in association with Warner Bros. Television.

The show takes place in New York City, and was filmed on location there. It stars an ensemble cast of characters, the storylines centered on the lives of police officers in the New York City Police Department (NYPD) and the firefighters and Emergency Medical Services (EMS) Personnel in the New York City Fire Department (FDNY), all working the same fictional precinct during the 3:00p.m. to 11:00p.m. shift, also known as the "third watch".

After the September 11 attacks hit New York in 2001, season three opened with the episode "In Their Own Words", which aired on October 15, 2001, and featured interviews with real-life NYPD and FDNY members who responded to the attacks. The following episode was titled "September Tenth".

== Premise ==
The series followed the exploits of a group of police officers, firefighters, and paramedics in the fictional NYPD 55th Precinct and the fictional FDNY Squad 55/Ladder 100/Battalion 24 firehouse, whose shifts fell between 3 pm and 11 pm, the "third watch". The precinct and fire station were located on the fictional corner of King Boulevard and Arthur Street; hence the nickname "Camelot". Exterior and interior shots of the 55th Precinct and the firehouse were filmed in Long Island City, Queens; however, in the show, they are located somewhere between Midtown Manhattan, Inwood, and the Bronx.

Third Watch succeeded in presenting all three branches of New York City's emergency services in the same show, reviving a failed attempt to do so nine years prior with the similarly themed H.E.L.P. The show balanced numerous single-episode events with other, ongoing storylines, some of which spanned multiple seasons. Though it gained much acclaim and eventually won an award for its emotional and honest portrayal of 9/11 and its aftermath, Third Watch was also criticized in some circles for extremely detailed violence, and extensive (by network standards) profane language. The show was created, produced, and written by John Wells and Edward Allen Bernero. The theme song for the show was "Keep Hope Alive" by The Crystal Method, except for the pilot episode, when "Right Here, Right Now" by Fatboy Slim was played during the opening sequence.

In the spring of 2005, NBC decided not to renew Third Watch, making the sixth season its last. The series' finale, "Goodbye to Camelot", aired in the United States on Friday, May 6, 2005. Several major newspapers, including the New York Times and the Bergen Record, have since listed it as a TV show that was cancelled too early.

== Conception ==
John Wells had wanted to do a show about paramedics for some time due to his work on ER, but did not think he had enough material to make such a show. Ed Bernero, a former Chicago cop, had wanted to do a police drama partly based on his own experiences. The two worked together on the short-lived show Trinity and, after that show was cancelled, Wells asked Bernero if he wanted to co-create a show with him.

Originally, the show was only going to be about the police and paramedics, but firefighter Jimmy Doherty was added to the show after Eddie Cibrian auditioned for the role of Bosco. Cibrian lost out to Jason Wiles, but because of the attention he received from women due to his good looks, the producers decided to put him in the show as a new character. Bernero reportedly commented that they did not have any firefighters, and the fire aspect of the show was added.

== Episodes ==
The series consists of six seasons with a total of 132 episodes, produced and broadcast from September 23, 1999, to May 6, 2005.

Season	Episodes	Originally released	
Season	Episodes	First released	Last released
1	22	September 23, 1999	May 22, 2000
2	22	October 2, 2000	May 21, 2001
3	22	October 15, 2001	May 13, 2002
4	22	September 30, 2002	April 28, 2003
5	22	September 29, 2003	May 7, 2004
6	22	September 17, 2004	May 6, 2005

=== Crossovers ===
- "Unleashed" — Yokas and Bosco help Dr. Susan Lewis find her drug-addicted sister and her niece, who went missing. The story begins on ER in the episode "Brothers & Sisters".
- "Disaster" — An AWOL soldier arrested for a jewelry store robbery that left a friend of Sully's dead contracts a virus that begins to spread. The story concludes on Medical Investigation in the episode "Half-Life".

== Main cast ==
Several cast members of Third Watch. Left to right: Jimmy Doherty (FDNY firefighter) (Eddie Cibrian), Kim Zambrano (FDNY paramedic) (Kim Raver), Fred Yokas (Chris Bauer), Ty Davis Jr. (NYPD officer) (Coby Bell), Faith Yokas (NYPD officer) (Molly Price), Maurice 'Bosco' Boscorelli (NYPD officer) (Jason Wiles), John 'Sully' Sullivan (NYPD officer) (Skipp Sudduth), Maritza Cruz (NYPD detective) (Tia Texada), Monte 'Doc' Parker (FDNY paramedic) (Michael Beach), Carlos Nieto (FDNY paramedic) (Anthony Ruivivar) and Sasha Monroe (NYPD officer) (Nia Long)

Third Watch's original ensemble cast in the series' first season consisted of Michael Beach, Coby Bell, Bobby Cannavale, Eddie Cibrian, Molly Price, Kim Raver, Anthony Ruivivar, Skipp Sudduth, and Jason Wiles.

Eddie Cibrian also portrayed the contract-role of Cole on Sunset Beach while appearing on Third Watch at the same time until Sunset Beach's cancellation on September 17, 1999.

In 2000, Amy Carlson was added to the cast as paramedic/firefighter Alex Taylor. In 2001, series regular Bobby Cannavale willingly left the series after he asked to be written out due to lack of character use and development.

At the start of season three, Chris Bauer was added to the main credits as Fred Yokas after being a recurring guest star previously. Tia Texada became a recurring guest star, and later, a full cast member, in 2002. Carlson left the show in 2003. Later that year, Nia Long was introduced as Officer Sasha Monroe (her rank was changed in season six in one of the show's most shocking plot twists). Yvonne Jung became a recurring guest star also in 2003, although she had been a guest in season-three episode "Act Brave" as a lawyer defending Kim in her custody battle with Jimmy. Also in 2003, Bonnie Dennison was added as Emily Yokas, previously being recurring.

In 2004, just after celebrating the show's 100th episode, Eddie Cibrian and Michael Beach left the show. Cibrian's departure marked the first time a main character was written out of the show without dying. Series regular Molly Price's character, Faith Yokas, made very few appearances in season five of the series because Price was pregnant throughout much of the season. The writers for Third Watch explained her absence by her character being seriously injured in a shootout, and then trying to recuperate at home. In the few scenes Price was in, her growing belly was frequently hidden by blankets piled on top of her while she lay in bed. Cara Buono joined the cast as Paramedic Grace Foster late in the show's fifth season in 2004.

Kim Raver decided to leave the show after the show's sixth-season opener and became a series regular on 24. Josh Stewart was introduced as a main cast member of season six as Probationary Officer Brendan Finney. After a several-month absence, Dennison reclaimed the role of Emily Yokas for the rest of the final season, while Chris Bauer left the show to pursue his new show Tilt, which coincidentally co-starred his former Third Watch castmate, Eddie Cibrian, but made sporadic guest-star appearances in season six. Beach, Cibrian, and Raver rejoined their former co-stars in the series finale, "Goodbye To Camelot".

=== Main cast ===
Actor	Character	Seasons as main cast	Seasons as recurring/guest	Episodes (as main cast)
Michael Beach	FDNY Paramedic Monte "Doc" Parker	1–5	6	1–103
Coby Bell	NYPD Officer Tyrone "Ty" Davis, Jr.	1–6		1–132
Bobby Cannavale	FDNY Paramedic Roberto "Bobby" Caffey	1–2		1–38
Eddie Cibrian	FDNY Firefighter/Lieutenant James "Jimmy" Doherty	1–5	6	1–101
Molly Price	NYPD Officer/Detective Faith Yokas	1–6		1–132
Kim Raver	FDNY Paramedic Kimberly "Kim" Zambrano	1–5	6	1–111
Anthony Ruivivar	FDNY Paramedic Carlos Nieto	1–6		1–132
Skipp Sudduth	NYPD Officer John "Sully" Sullivan	1–6		1–132
Jason Wiles	NYPD Officer Maurice "Bosco" Boscorelli	1–6		1–132
Amy Carlson	FDNY Paramedic/firefighter Alexandra "Alex" Taylor	2–4		26–88
Chris Bauer	Frederick "Fred" Yokas	3–5	1–2, 6	45–110
Tia Texada	NYPD Sergeant Maritza Cruz	4–6	4	80–132
Nia Long	NYPD Officer/IAB Detective Sasha Monroe	5–6	4	89–132
Bonnie Dennison	Emily Yokas<sup>1</sup>	5–6	1–4	89–132
Cara Buono	FDNY Paramedic Grace Foster	6	5	111–132
Josh Stewart	NYPD Officer Brendan Finney	6		113–132

<sup>1</sup> <small>The Yokas' oldest child Emily was portrayed by P.J. Morrison in seasons one-three in a recurring role. Dennison took over the role in season four and received star billing in the final two seasons in the episodes in which she appeared.</small>

=== Recurring cast ===
These cast members are listed by the season in which they were introduced:

Actor	Character	Seasons as recurring cast	Notes
Derek Kelly	FDNY Firefighter Derek "DK" Kitson	1–6	Real-life FDNY firefighter; real-life husband of Molly Price
Bill Walsh	FDNY Firefighter/Lieutenant William "Billy" Walsh	1–6	Real-life FDNY firefighter
Patti D'Arbanville	Rose Boscorelli	1–6	Bosco's mother
Jeremy Bergman	Charles "Charlie" Yokas	1–4	Faith and Fred's youngest child
Lonette McKee	Maggie Davis	1–4	Ty's mother
Monica Trombetta	Dana Murphy	1–2	ER Nurse
James Rebhorn	NYPD Captain "Stick" Elchisak	1–3	NYPD Captain of 55th Precinct
P.J. Morrison	Emily Yokas	1–3	First actress to portray character
Kristopher Scott Fiedell	Joseph "Joey" Doherty	1–3	Kim and Jimmy's son
Eva LaRue	NYPD Officer Brooke Doherty	1–2	Jimmy's second wife
Lisa Vidal	Dr. Sarah Morales	1–2	Attending at Mercy Hospital; Doc's love interest
Wendell Pierce	NYPD Officer Conrad "Candyman" Jones	1	Cop with long and spotty history partnered with Davis' father
Nick Chinlund	NYPD Detective Tancredi	1	
Ernest Mingione	NYPD Lieutenant Kowalski	1	
Peter Vack	"The Rod Rodney"	1	
Jon Seda	Mateo "Matty" Caffey	1–2	Bobby's ex-con brother
Saundra McClain	Nurse Mary Proctor	2–6	Primary nurse at Mercy
John Michael Bolger	FDNY Lieutenant Johnson	2–4	
Savannah Haske	Tatiana Deschenko	2–4	Wife of Sully
Nick Sandow	FDNY Firefighter Joseph "Joe" Lombardo III	2	
Carol Woods	NYPD Lieutenant Rice	2	
Anne Twomey	Catherine Zambrano	2	Mother of Kim
Joe Lisi	NYPD Lieutenant Robert "Bob" Swersky	3–6	
Sterling K. Brown	NYPD Officer Edward Dade	3–5	
Charlie Day	Michael "Mikey" Boscorelli	3–5	Brother of Bosco
Brad Beyer	NYPD Sergeant Jason Christopher	2–3	
Charlie McWade	NYPD Officer Steven Gusler	3	A squeamish new officer training under Yokas and Bosco
Darien Sills-Evans	Dr. Fields	4–6	Attending at Mercy
James Remar	NYPD Detective Madjanski	4	
Yvonne Jung	FDNY Paramedic Holly Levine	5–6	Love interest of Carlos, real-life wife of Anthony Ruivivar
Joe Badalucco	NYPD Detective "Jelly" Grimaldi	5–6	Yokas' partner once she was promoted to detective
Charles Haid	NYPD IAB Captain Cathal "CT" Finney	6	Corrupt; father of Brendan
Manny Pérez	NYPD Officer Manny Santiago	6	Partner to Cruz
Aidan Quinn	NYPD Lieutenant John Miller	6	Partner and eventual love interest to Yokas
Jason Shaw	FDNY Firefighter Stu "Lotta Zs" Szczelaszczyk	6	

== Main crew ==
=== Directors ===
- Guy Norman Bee
- Peter Ellis (5 episodes, 2002–2003)
- Jesús Salvador Treviño (4 episodes, 2001–2002)
- Vincent Misiano
- Christopher Chulack (3 episodes, 1999–2004)
- Charles Haid (3 episodes, 2000–2005)
- Félix Enríquez Alcalá (3 episodes, 2003–2005)
- Gloria Muzio (3 episodes, 2003–2005)
- Skipp Sudduth (3 episodes, 2003–2005)
- Edward Allen Bernero (3 episodes, 2004–2005)
- Nelson McCormick (3 episodes, 2004–2005)
- Chris Misiano (2 episodes, 1999–2000)
- Bryan Spicer (2 episodes, 1999–2000)
- R.W. Goodwin (2 episodes, 1999)
- Jace Alexander (2 episodes, 2000–2001)
- Nick Gomez (2 episodes, 2000–2001)
- Michael Fields (2 episodes, 2000)
- Julie Hébert
- Stephen Cragg (2 episodes, 2004–2005)
- John E. Gallagher (2 episodes, 2004–2005)
- Paul Michael Glaser (2 episodes, 2004–2005)
- Rosemary Rodriguez
- Matt Earl Beesley (2 episodes, 2004)
- Brooke Kennedy

=== Writers ===
- Edward Allen Bernero (132 episodes, 1999–2005)
- John Wells (132 episodes, 1999–2005)
- Janine Sherman (13 episodes, 2000–2005)
- Scott Williams (11 episodes, 2001–2004)
- John Ridley (6 episodes, 1999–2001)
- Charles Murray (5 episodes, 2003–2005)
- Lance Gentile (4 episodes, 1999–2000)
- Bonnie Mark (4 episodes, 2000–2001)
- Angela Amato (4 episodes, 2003–2005)
- Terri Kopp (3 episodes, 1999–2000)
- John Romano (3 episodes, 1999–2000)
- Julie Hébert (2 episodes, 2000–2001)
- Kyra Keene (2 episodes, 2000–2001)
- Victor De Jesus (2 episodes, 2004)
- Siobhan Byrne (unknown episodes)
- Paul Golding (unknown episodes)
- Brooke Kennedy (unknown episodes)
- Jorge Zamacona

== Broadcast and ratings information ==
All six seasons of Third Watch were originally broadcast on NBC in the United States and simulcast in Canada on CTV .

Season		Premiere	Finale	Viewers (in millions)	Rank
1	Sunday 8:00 pm ET (1999) Monday 10:00 pm ET (2000)	September 23, 1999	May 22, 2000	14.79<ref name="Quotenmeter99-00">"US-Jahrescharts 1999/2000". Quotenmeter.de. May 30, 2002.</ref>	–
2	Monday 10:00 pm ET	October 2, 2000	May 21, 2001	16.80	#46
3	Monday 9:00 pm ET	October 15, 2001	May 13, 2002	15.29<ref name="USATwrap01-02">"How did your favorite show rate?". USA Today. May 28, 2002.</ref>	#38
4	Monday 9:00 pm ET	September 30, 2002	April 28, 2003	14.85<ref name="Nielsen02-03">"Nielsen's TOP 156 Shows for 2002–03". rec.arts.tv. May 20, 2003.</ref>	#36
5	Monday 10:00 pm ET (September–October 2003) Friday 10:00 pm ET (October 2003-May 2004)	September 29, 2003	May 7, 2004	15.35<ref name="ABCwrap04-05">"I.T.R.S. Ranking Report". ABC Television Network. June 2, 2004. Archived from the original on September 30, 2007.</ref>	#62
6	Friday 9:00 pm ET	September 17, 2004	May 6, 2005	15.22<ref name="HPwrap04-05">"2004–05 primetime series wrap". The Hollywood Reporter. May 27, 2005. Archived from the original on October 30, 2007.</ref>	#55

Third Watch was also broadcast worldwide including Africa, Europe, Latin America, Asia, Oceania and the Middle East.

== Home media and syndication ==
Warner Home Video released Season 1 of Third Watch on DVD in Regions 1, 2 and 4. Season 2 was released in Region 1 on July 7, 2009.

Season	Episodes	Release dates		
Season	Episodes	Region 1	Region 2	Region 4
1	22	February 5, 2008	May 22, 2006	May 3, 2006
1	22	Third Watch: The Complete First Season contains the 22 episodes of the series' first season in addition to special features which include a behind-the-scenes featurette, unaired scenes and a gag reel. Although the first season was released on DVD relatively later in Region 1 than Regions 2 and 4, special features are found in the Region 1 DVD box-set only.		
2	22	July 7, 2009	TBA	TBA
2	22	Third Watch: The Complete Second Season contains the 22 episodes of the series' second season. A gag reel is included as a special feature.		

Music licensing issues delayed the release of the first two seasons and as of January 2026 there have been no updates regarding the release of the remaining seasons on DVD, however, in September 2025, the four remaining seasons, as well as a “series-complete box set”, became available for purchase via online streaming platforms such as YouTube and Apple TV. However, some post-broadcast releases include episodes slightly modified, with music different from the original broadcasts.

The first three seasons of Third Watch were available for streaming on Crave TV from March 2015 until 2021.

In December 2021, The Roku Channel added all 6 seasons of Third Watch to watch for free (with the exception of Season 4, Episode 12). In December 2022, Roku stopped offering the show for streaming, only to re-add it again in late March 2023.

In February 2023, Tubi added all 6 seasons of Third Watch to watch for free. However, some users will not be able to access it depending on which country their IPN identifies as their location (it isn't available in all countries). It is noticeable in this release that several of the songs used in the show have been changed to overcome the initial musical licensing issues.

In February 2026, all six seasons of Third Watch were available for streaming on Apple TV.

Third Watch also aired in Syndication on A&E at various times between the fall of 2002 and 2011. As of April 2023, it can be seen on HLN weeknights in a four-hour block from 8:00 PM to 11:00 PM (Eastern Standard Time).

== Reception ==
The series won the Peabody Award for Season 3 episode "In Their Own Words", in which series regulars Michael Beach, Coby Bell, Amy Carlson, Eddie Cibrian, Kim Raver, Anthony Ruivivar, Skipp Sudduth, and Jason Wiles introduced clips of interviews with real-life NYPD and FDNY members who responded to the September 11 attacks on the World Trade Center. Series regular Molly Price was interviewed in a segment because she is married to real-life FDNY firefighter and Third Watch recurring guest star Derek Kelly.

Many Third Watch former cast members were nominated for awards for their work on the show. Among them, both Bobby Cannavale and Anthony Ruivivar were nominated for ALMA Awards for their positive portrayals of Latino characters. Nia Long also won several NAACP Image Awards for her portrayal of the African-American character Sasha Monroe. Other cast members, including Michael Beach, Molly Price, and Tia Texada also were nominated for various awards. The show itself was nominated for several Primetime Emmy Awards including Outstanding Stunt Coordination and Outstanding Sound Editing for a Series, which it won in 2000.

== See also ==
- Rescue Me, 2004–2011 American television series about NYC firefighters
- Firehouse, 1974 American television series about LA firefighters
