= William Welch II =

William Welch II is the former Chief of the Public Integrity Section of the United States Department of Justice (DOJ). Welch is noted chiefly for his role in the prosecution of former Alaska Senator Ted Stevens and the prosecution of U.S. intelligence community whistleblowers for alleged leaks to the press.

Welch resigned on April 16, 2012, amid allegations that the DOJ Public Integrity Section had purposefully hid exculpatory evidence in the case against Stevens.

== Education ==
Welch graduated from Princeton University in 1985, and from the Northwestern University School of Law in Chicago in 1988.

== Role in Department of Justice ==
Welch spent much of his career in U.S. Department of Justice service.

After graduation from law school, Welch moved to Washington, D.C., serving for several years in the Tax Division of the DOJ. Following this he served as Assistant US Attorney, in Reno, Nevada, where he specialized on drug and money-laundering cases. In 1995, Welch was transferred to the Springfield, Massachusetts US Attorneys Office. In 2006, he moved to Washington, and took the job of acting chief of the DOJ Public Integrity Section. By 2007, he was confirmed in the role of Chief of the Section.

== Noted cases ==
During the Bush administration, Welch's most famous case involved the Ted Stevens ethics prosecution. During the Obama administration, Welch's portfolio focused on Bush-era investigations which had failed to lead to actual charges. Among these, Welch is most noted for using the 1917 Espionage Act to prosecute two U.S. intelligence officers speaking to the press, in effect prosecuting the officers for whistleblowing.

=== Ted Stevens Case ===
Assistant Attorney General Welch was one of six lawyers investigated between 2009 and 2012 in relation to the botched ethics prosecution of former Alaska Senator Ted Stevens. Welch stepped down briefly over the controversy in October 2009, returning to Springfield, Massachusetts, where he'd worked as an assistant US Attorney before coming to Washington. After one month, Assistant Attorney General Lanny Breuer, head of the DOJ Criminal Division, reinstated Welch, placing him in charge of pursuing national security leaks.

In 2012, the Special Counsel report on the case was released. It said,

The investigation and prosecution of U.S. Senator Ted Stevens were permeated by the systematic concealment of significant exculpatory evidence which would have independently corroborated Senator Stevens's defense and his testimony, and seriously damaged the testimony and credibility of the government's key witness.

=== Prosecution of U.S. intelligence leaks ===
==== Thomas Drake case ====
Welch oversaw the case against Thomas Drake, claiming that Mr. Drake had leaked national security secrets to the press; Mr. Drake was subsequently charged with ten felony counts, the principal charges being forwarded under the Espionage Act of 1917. Writing about the case in The Washingtonian, commentator Shane Harris noted Welch's tenacity in the case and his opponents' characterization of him as "...a piranha,... a man with 'tunnel vision', ... a 'hard ass' who tends to view his targets in the worst possible light." Harris quotes Steven Aftergood, a noted critic on US Secrecy Policy, as saying, "It seems clear that the Obama Administration misjudged the merits of its case against Drake, pursuing minor infractions with disproportionate zeal."

==== Jeffrey Sterling case ====
Welch oversaw the ongoing case against former CIA officer Jeffrey Sterling. Sterling was indicted in December 2010 under the Espionage Act of 1917 on charges he had violated national security provisions by disclosing classified information to a New York Times journalist, James Risen, specifically being information used in the book State of War. The information allegedly leaked addressed a secret program related to weapons of mass destruction proliferation.

== Departure from government service ==
Welch was reprimanded for failure to remit required discovery evidence in the Stevens case as well as the intelligence leaks prosecutions. On April 17, 2012, William Welch left his job the Department of Justice.

As of September 2022, Welch is Deputy General Counsel at Voya Financial.
