= John McIntyre (copy editor) =

American journalist and copy editor

- Born: Kentucky, United States
- Education: Michigan State University; Syracuse University
- Occupations: Copyeditor and journalist
- Employer: The Baltimore Sun (1986–2009, 2010–2021)
- Organization(s): Co-founder and former president of the American Copy Editors Society
- Notable work: The Old Editor Says and Bad Advice

John E. McIntyre is an American journalist and copy editor. McIntyre is a cofounder and two-term president of the American Copy Editors Society.

== Life and career ==
McIntyre was born in Kentucky and grew up in Elizaville, in Fleming County, Kentucky. He graduated from Fleming County High School in Flemingsburg, Kentucky in 1969. He then earned a bachelor's degree in English from Michigan State University in 1973. From 1973 to 1979 he attended Syracuse University, earning a master's degree in English but leaving without completing his doctorate.

From 1980 to 1986 McIntyre worked as a copy editor at The Cincinnati Enquirer. He became a copy editor at The Baltimore Sun in 1986. On April 29, 2009, McIntyre was laid off by The Sun. He was rehired in 2010 to serve as the newspaper's Night Content Production Manager. He retired from The Sun in 2021, after accepting a buyout from the newspaper's new owner Alden Global Capital.

In 1997, McIntyre helped to found the American Copy Editors Society, and subsequently served as its president for two terms. McIntyre is also an affiliate adjunct instructor at Loyola College in Maryland. He published a parody video titled "Trigger Warning" for his students on Facebook in 2016, which warned them about the tedium and difficulty of the material. It was criticized by some students who felt that it trivialized trigger warnings.

McIntyre maintains a blog called "You Don't Say" on the Sun website, discussing a variety of topics including grammar usage, journalism, and copy editing. The blog received an average of 20,000 to 30,000 monthly pageviews in 2017. His online following grew after posting a video on the grammatical use of the singular they which received over 1 million views. His blog has weighed in on various topics related to grammar, such as the controversy over the trademarking of Cafe Hon and "Weird Al" Yankovic's "Word Crimes".

He is the author of two books published by Apprentice House Press at Loyola University Maryland, The Old Editor Says: Maxims for Writing and Editing (2013) and Bad Advice: The Most Unreliable Counsel Available on grammar, Usage, and Writing (2020).
