= Copy editing =

Improving the formatting, style, and accuracy of text

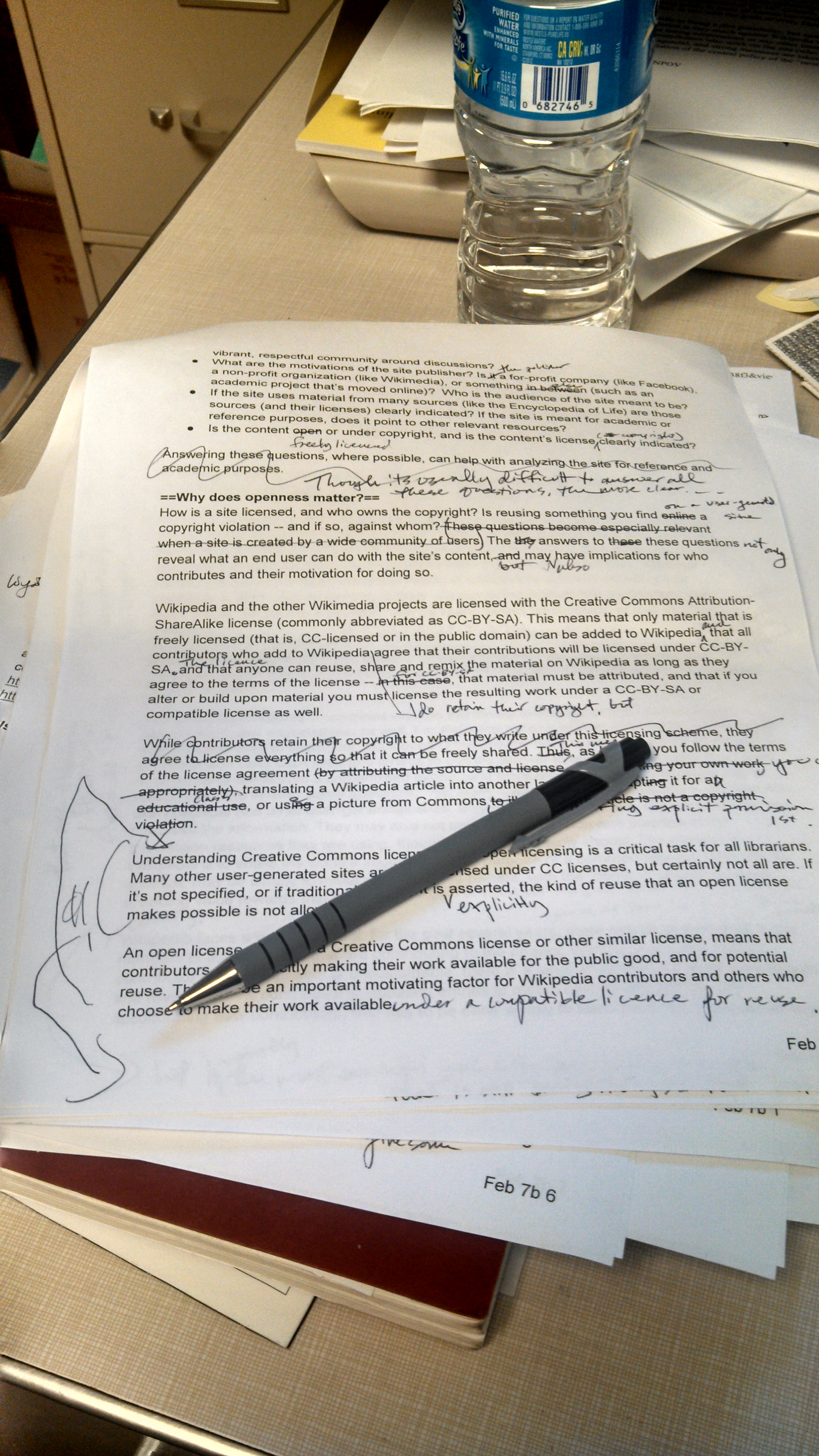
Example of non-professional copy editing in progress

Copy editing (also known as copyediting, copy-editing and manuscript editing) is the process of revising written material ("copy") to improve quality and readability, ensuring that a text is free of errors in grammar and style and that it is accurate. The Chicago Manual of Style states that manuscript editing encompasses "simple mechanical corrections (mechanical editing) through sentence-level interventions (linear editing) to substantial remedial work on literary style and clarity, disorganized passages, baggy prose, muddled tables and figures, and the like (substantive editing)". In the context of print publication, copy editing is done before typesetting and again before proofreading. Outside traditional book and journal publishing, the term "copy editing" is used more broadly and is sometimes referred to (inaccurately) as proofreading; the term sometimes encompasses additional tasks.

In the United States and Canada, an editor who does this work is called a copy editor. An organization's highest-ranking copy editor, or the supervising editor of a group of copy editors, may be known as the "copy chief", "copy desk chief", or "news editor". In the United Kingdom, the term "copy editor" is sometimes seen but the term subeditor (commonly shortened to "sub") is used in newspaper and magazine publishing. In the context of the Internet, online copy refers to the textual content of web pages. Similar to print, online copy editing is the process of revising and preparing the raw or draft text of web pages for publication.

Copy editing has three levels: light, medium, and heavy. Depending on the budget and scheduling of the publication, the publisher will let the copy editor know what level of editing to employ. The chosen type of editing will help the copy editor prioritize their efforts. Although copy editors are generally expected to make simple revisions to smooth awkward passages, they do not have a license to rewrite a text line by line, nor do they prepare material on an author's behalf. (Creating original content to be published under another person's name is called "ghostwriting".) Furthermore, copy editors are expected to query structural and organizational problems, but they are not expected to fix these problems. In addition, copy editors do not normally engage in "developmental editing", which includes helping an author develop an idea into a publishable manuscript, overhauling a rough draft, identifying gaps in subject coverage, devising strategies for more-effective communication of content, creating features to enhance the final product and helping to make it more competitive in the marketplace.

== Practices ==
=== Mechanical editing ===
Mechanical editing is the process of closely reading a piece of writing for consistency, either internally or in accordance with the publisher's house style. According to Einsohn, mechanical editors work with such things as the following:

- Abbreviations and acronyms
- Additional elements, such as charts, tables, and graphs
- Capitalization
- Footnotes and endnotes
- Hyphenation
- Italicization (appropriate use of emphasis (italic or bold); appropriate choice of broad typeface category (italic, roman, other), especially in mathematical or scientific texts)
- Numbers and numerals
- Punctuation
- Quotations
- Spelling

Gilad also mentions the following:

- Initialisms
- Page numbers, headers, and footers
- Underscoring

Proper spelling and punctuation are subjective in some cases, where they must be left to the discretion of the copy editor or the publisher. Most English language publishing firms use a widely recognized style guide such as the New Oxford Style Manual, The Chicago Manual of Style and The Canadian Style. Companies that produce documents and reports but do not consider themselves publishers in the usual sense tend to rely on in-house style guides or on the judgment of the copy editor.

=== Grammar and usage ===
The goal of the copy editor is to enforce inviolable rules while respecting personal stylistic preferences. This can be difficult, as some writers view grammatical corrections as a challenge to their intellectual ability or professional identity. Therefore, copy editors are encouraged to respect the author's preference if it is acceptable. This practice is complicated further by volatile language conventions as recorded by books on grammar and usage, the authors of which often disagree.

=== Content editing ===
Content editing consists of reorganizing or restructuring a document. This involves any inconsistent parts of the content as well as any variances. Content editors can fix the content by either rewriting it or heavily editing it. The copy editor will often point out especially difficult passages to the author, who will resolve the issues.

Although copy editors are not responsible for the factual correctness of the document, they can provide comments for the author on any information that they know to be untrue, such as year discrepancies or misleading ideas. Such fact-checking is acceptable for copy editors who know the document's subject matter.

The copy editor must also point out any biased language without infringing on the author's meaning. This includes material "that might form the basis for a lawsuit alleging libel, invasion of privacy, or obscenity". Some see censoring biased language as political correctness, so the copy editor must distinguish between the two. To do this, the copy editor will permit intentional "politically incorrect" views and censor only marginalized, offensive, or exclusive language.

=== Correlating parts, typecoding and permissions ===
Most manuscripts will require the copy editor to correlate the parts within them. Copy editors must carry out the following tasks in this process:

- Verify any cross-references that appear in the text
- Check the numbering of footnotes, endnotes, tables and illustrations
- Specify the placement of tables and illustrations
- Check the content of the illustrations against the captions and the text
- Read the list of illustrations against the illustrations and captions
- Read the table of contents against the manuscript
- Read the footnotes/endnotes and in-text citations against the bibliography
- Check the alphabetization of the bibliography or reference list

Some manuscripts may require special cross-checking. For example, in a how-to text, a copy editor might need to verify that the list of equipment or parts matches the instructions given within the text.

Typecoding is the process of identifying which sections of the manuscript are not regular running text. These portions of text, known as elements, include the following:

- Part and chapter numbers
- Titles and subtitles
- Headings and subheadings
- Lists
- Extracts
- Displayed equations
- Table numbers
- Source lines
- Footnotes
- Figure numbers and captions

It is the copy editor's job to typecode (or make note of) all manuscript elements for the publication designer. Hard-copy copy editors are usually asked to pencil in the type codes in the left margin of the manuscript. On-screen copy editors may be asked to insert type codes at the beginning and end of each element.

Finally, if the manuscript contains long quotations from a published work that is still under copyright, the copy editor should remind the author to acquire permission to reprint those quotations. The same goes for the reprinting of tables, charts, graphs, as well as illustrations that have appeared in print. Rules vary for the reproduction of unpublished materials (letters, diaries, etc.)

== Processes ==
There are basic procedures that every copy editor must follow: copy editors need a system for marking changes to the author's text (marking), a process for querying the author and the editorial coordinator (querying), a method for keeping track of editorial decisions (record-keeping), and procedures for incorporating the author's review of the copy editing into a final document (cleanup). These systems were originally developed in an era before that of the computer, but over time, these procedures were adapted for a digital on-screen space.

Each medium (in print and on screen) has its own affordances and, although a copy editor may prefer one editing process over the other, copy editors are practically required to use both techniques.

=== Hard-copy editing ===
Traditional markup copy editing, or hard-copy editing, is still important because screening tests for employment may be administered in hard copy. Also, the author whose text the copy editor is editing may prefer hard-copy markup, so copy editors need to know traditional markup in case documents and materials cannot be exchanged electronically. When editing in hard copy, all participating parties (the editor, author, typesetter and proofreader) must understand the marks the copy editor makes. Copy editors working on hard copy write their corrections in the text directly, leaving the margins for querying. Usually, the copy editor is asked to write in a bright color so that the author and other parties can easily recognize the copy editor's changes.

=== On-screen editing ===
Every year, more editing projects are being done on computers and fewer in print. Also, if there is a digital version of a text that the copy editor is editing, the latter can more easily search words, run spell checkers and generate clean copies of messy pages. The first thing copy editors must do when editing on screen is to copy the author's files, as the original document must be preserved. Each word-processing program provides various options for how an editor's markups are shown on screen and on the printout. On-screen editing mainly differs from hard-copy editing in the fact that the copy editor should edit more cleanly on screen, refraining from saving parts of words and be careful in maintaining proper line spacing.

=== Querying ===
Copy editors often need to query their authors to address questions, comments, or explanations: most of these can be done in the margins of the text, or the comment section when on screen. The copy editor must consider when to query and the length and tone of their queries, as querying too often or seldom, cryptically, or sarcastically can result in a negative relationship between the copy editor and the author.

== Goals ==
A copy editor's goals may change, depending on the publication for which they work; however, there are a few constituencies that must always be served – the author (the person who wrote or compiled the manuscript), the publisher (the person or company that pays for production) and the readers (the audience for whom the material is being produced). These parties (together with the copy editor) work to achieve the same goal, namely, to produce an error-free publication and improve the reader experience by reducing extraneous cognitive load. The copy editor strives to improve clarity, coherence, consistency and correctness – otherwise known as the "4 Cs", each of which serves the copy editor's "cardinal C", which is communication.

== History ==
The biggest difference between monastic copyists and copy editors is that copy editors leave edits as suggestions that can be rejected by the writer. These printing houses established procedures for editing, preparing the text and proofreading the first typeset galley proofs. Specialist correctors ensured that texts followed the standards of the time.

After the globalization of the book from 1800 to 1970 came the rise of American writers and editors. One editor in particular, Maxwell Perkins, was sought out by writers such as Fitzgerald, Hemingway and Wolfe, because he greatly improved the work of these prominent authors with his editorial eye. Perkins was known for editing, guiding and befriending his writers – but the times were changing.

In the late 19th century, the role of an editor was to decide if a manuscript was good enough to be published. As time passed, the role of an editor and publisher became more distant. Although there was a newfound relationship between editors and authors, thoughtful editing did not end.

Copy editors were employed at various publishing houses, magazines, journals, as well as by private authors seeking revisions to their work. Some copy editors were even employed by public relations and advertising firms that valued strong editing practices in their business.

The symbols used by copy editors today are based on those that have been used by proofreaders since the beginnings of publishing, though they have undergone some changes over time. However, the exact beginnings of the copy editing language used today are unclear. Despite its long history, copy editing as a practice has not experienced any extreme upheaval other than the desktop publishing revolution of the 1980s. This phenomenon began as the result of a series of inventions that were released during the middle of this decade, and refers to the growth of technology usage in the field of copy editing. Namely, the development of the Xerox Star computer, with its Viewpoint desktop environment and the Xerox multilingual character code (the precursor of Unicode); as well as others, such as the Macintosh computer, the desktop laser printer by Hewlett-Packard, and software for desktop publishing called PageMaker allowed the revolution to begin. By allowing both individuals and publishing agencies alike to cheaply and effectively begin to edit compositions entirely on-screen rather than by hand, desktop publishing revolution morphed copy editing into the practice it is today. Most copy editors today rely on more modern WYSIWYG (what you see is what you get) text processors such as Microsoft Word that are based on the original PageMaker to do their work.

There were a few events that led to changes within copy editing as a career. One of these, the successful strike of the editorial department of the Newark Ledger from 17 November 1934, to 28 March 1935, was "the first major action of its kind by any local guild ... [it] both confirmed the irreversibility of the guilds' movement away from the professional association idea and greatly accelerated that process". Paired with another string of strikes led by The New York Newspaper Guild against several smaller newspapers in the summer of 1934, these actions served to shift the image of the editorial worker as a "professional" to one as an average citizen. Another strike from the year 1934 was the strike at the Macaulay Company, reportedly the first-ever strike to occur at a publishing firm. At the conclusion of the second Macaulay strike, which occurred three months after the first, the nationwide drive towards unionization had entered the publishing industry and was "sweeping through all the major publishing houses".

Owing to the rise of the Digital Age, the roles and responsibilities of a copy editor have changed. For instance, beginning in 1990, copy editors learned pagination electronically. They could now look at multiple pages of a text on multiple screens and easily make their edits in that environment, as opposed to pasting physical paper cut-outs onto a board by hand. This technological advance also required that copy editors learn new software such as Adobe InDesign, QuarkXPress, Affinity Publisher, or Scribus.

Modern copy editors are often required to edit for digital as well as print versions of the text. Digital copy editing requires copy editors to understand RSS feeds, social media and HTML. What should be accounted for is that, in this digital age, information is constantly being released, which has led to a decline in the editing of the online versions. Editors of the website BuzzFeed commented that sometimes they "simply can't get [to] every post before it's published". While copy editors still do traditional tasks such as checking facts, grammar, style and writing headlines, some of their duties have been pushed aside to make way for technology. Some copy editors now have to design page layouts and some even edit video content. Copy editors are now sometimes referred to as "copy/layout editors" or "producers/designers".

== Changes in the field ==
Traditionally, the copy editor would read a printed or written manuscript, manually marking it with the editor's "correction marks". At sizable newspapers, the main copy desk was often U-shaped; the copy desk chief sat in the "slot" (the center space of the U) and was known as the "slot man", while copy editors were arrayed around him or her on the outside of the U, known as the "rim". In the past, copy editors were sometimes known humorously as "rim rats". Chief copy editors are still sometimes called "the slot". But nowadays, the manuscript is more often read on a computer display and text corrections are entered directly.

The nearly universal adoption of computerized systems for editing and layout in newspapers and magazines has also led copy editors to become more involved in the design and the technicalities of production. Technical knowledge is therefore sometimes considered as important as writing ability, though this is truer in journalism than it is in book publishing. Hank Glamann, the co-founder of the American Copy Editors Society, made the following observation about ads for copy editor positions at American newspapers:

We want them to be skilled grammarians and wordsmiths and write bright and engaging headlines, and they must know Quark. But, often, when push comes to shove, we will let every single one of those requirements slide except the last one, because you have to know that to push the button at the appointed time.

== Traits, skills and training ==
Many copy editors have a college degree, often in journalism, communications, or the language of the writing that they edit. Additionally, some copy editors take it upon themselves to gain a background in topics that would further help their careers. For instance, some copy editors may seek knowledge and background in statistics to help catch mistakes related to data within an article, to help authors have a better chance of getting published.

In the United States, copy editing is often taught as a college journalism course, though its name varies. The courses often include news design and pagination.

In the United States, the Dow Jones Newspaper Fund used to sponsor internships that include two weeks of training. Currently, they place college students in paid summer internships (10-12 weeks) with news organizations across the U.S. Also, the American Press Institute, the Poynter Institute, the University of North Carolina at Chapel Hill, UC San Diego Extension and conferences of the American Copy Editors Society offer mid-career training for newspaper copy editors and news editors (news copy desk supervisors).

Most U.S. newspapers and publishers give copy editing job candidates an editing test or a tryout. These vary widely and can include general items such as acronyms, current events, math, punctuation, as well as skills such as the use of Associated Press style, headline writing, infographics editing and journalism ethics.

Copy editors can also be trained in other software programs to ensure accuracy within a writer's work. Whether using programs like Illustrator, Publisher, or Photoshop, copy editors can obtain skills in using different types of software to help catch further errors that may be present in a writer's work. Due to new developments in technology and its various uses, the training and skills that would help a copy editor are expected to change in the future.

== Differentiating from other forms of editing ==
Copy editing is an important step in the editing process. It is useful to differentiate it from other forms of editing to understand its unique role and significance.

=== Vs. substantive editing ===
- Copy editing: This process focuses on the clarity, accuracy, consistency and overall readability of the text. It involves checking for grammatical errors, punctuation mistakes, inconsistencies in style and formatting (and compliance with house style), and ensuring that the text flows smoothly. The primary goal is to polish the content without altering its core message.
- Substantive editing: Also known as structural or developmental editing, substantive editing delves deeper into the content's structure and organization. It addresses issues like pacing, plot development in fiction, argument strength in non-fiction and overall content organization. This form of editing may involve reordering sections, suggesting additional content, or recommending deletions.

=== Vs. proofreading ===
- Copy editing: As mentioned, copy editing focuses on improving the content's clarity, coherence and consistency. It ensures that the text adheres to a particular style guide and is free from factual errors
- Proofreading: This is the final step in the editing process. Proofreading involves checking the text for typographical errors, grammatical mistakes, and formatting inconsistencies. It is the last line of defense before the content is published and attempts to ensure that no minor errors slip through.

=== Vs. line editing ===
- Copy editing: This form of editing looks at the text from a broader perspective, ensuring consistency in style, tone, and voice. It also checks for factual accuracy and potential legal issues.
- Line editing: Line editing is a more in-depth review of each line in the manuscript. It focuses on the creative content, writing style and language use at the sentence and paragraph level. The goal is to enhance the prose, making it clear and engaging.

Understanding these distinctions is useful for authors, publishers and editors, to ensure that each piece of content undergoes the appropriate level of scrutiny and refinement before reaching its audience.

== Contemporary ==
Before the digital era, copy editors would mark errors and inconsistencies with a red pen, using a markup language of symbols that were universally known. The traditional copy editor was once defined as editing for grammar, spelling, punctuation and other mechanics of style.

Copy editing symbols cannot be used in digital editing because they are not supported by tools such as track changes. With more posting online and less printing on paper, hard copies can no longer keep pace with digital publishing. For a publisher to hire copy editors to print a hard copy, make edits and then make changes, is no longer the most efficient process. The position of copy editors is at risk because software can correct grammatical errors more quickly and cheaply.

Professionals feared that the introduction of digital editing software would end copy editing careers. Copy editors are still employed and needed for heavy edits, such as fact-checking and content organization, which are beyond the abilities of the software. With grammar software and journalists who can edit, copy editors are seen as a luxury in publishing. The potential for a company to use editing software may also require the copy editor to only perform heavy editing and querying. Though the steps for copy editing are the same, the execution has been adapted for digital environments.

=== Contemporary copy editor ===
The field of copy editing is not obsolete. Teresa Schmedding, president of the American Copy Editors Society (ACES) and a deputy managing editor at the Daily Herald in Chicago, thinks that copy editors are "a natural fit" for digital journalism and social media because, though publishing has been made available to almost anyone, quality and credibility are brought to content only by copy editors.

Copy editors must now consider multimedia aspects of the story, such as video, images, audio and search engine optimization, which may be included in digital publications. Digital editing now requires copy editors to understand SEO, HTML, CSS and RSS feeds, as well as creative tools like Adobe Illustrator. This shows that the age of copy editing has now surpassed traditional methods of editing. The basics of checking grammar and punctuation are still necessary, but in the age of technology, the field of copy editing has grown to include digital editing of various forms of media. Contemporary copy editors now have to review and understand current technology to help authors gain credibility in today's digital age.

=== Issues ===
One of the problems with copy editing is that it may slow the publication of the text. With the digital publishing era came an increased demand for a fast turnover of information. Additional details such as color printing, page size and layout are determined by the allotted budget. Web-based publications, such as BuzzFeed and Slate, do not have enough room in their budgets to keep sufficient staff to edit their massive, daily rushes of content. Therefore copy chief Emmy Favila says lower-priority posts are published without copyedits at Buzzfeed. Slate does not edit its blog posts before publication, but all of its news articles are copy edited before publication, say Slate copy chief Lowen Liu and deputy editor Julia Turner.

In response to such high demands for fast-produced content, some online publications have started publishing articles first and then editing later, a process known as back-editing. Editors prioritize stories to edit based on traffic and whether the content was originally reported for needing edits.

Reading material has become increasingly accessible to users with a wide range of disabilities. Carolyn Rude exemplifies such cases in alternatively replacing illustrations with text and audio translations for the visually impaired. Rude also suggests that web developers attempt to stick to print guidelines, such as "clear and simple language and consistent terms and navigation devices", especially when readers are looking at text in a second language.

== See also ==
- ACES: The Society for Editing – Professional organization for copy editors
  - Robinson Prize – Annual award for excellence in copy editing
- Author editing – Editing an author's draft in preparation for its submission to publishers
- Headline – Text at the top of a newspaper article
- List of American copy editors
- News design – Process of arranging material on a newspaper page
- Photo caption – Text used to explain and elaborate on published photographs
- Proofreading – Detection of errors in transcribed text
- Style guide – Standard for writing and design of documents
  - AP Stylebook – Book on English usage by Associated Press
  - New Oxford Style Manual – Authoritative style guide published by Oxford University Press
  - The Chicago Manual of Style – Academic style guide for American English
  - Oxford English Corpus – Text corpus and database of 21st century English
