= William Welsh (footballer) =

English footballer

Personal information
- Position: Wing half

Senior career*
Years	Team	Apps	(Gls)
1919–1920	Grimsby Town	5	(0)
- * Club domestic league appearances and goals

William Welsh was an English professional footballer who played as a wing half.
