= Euclid Avenue Historic District (Cleveland) =

Historic district in Ohio, United States

- U.S. National Register of Historic Places
- U.S. Historic district
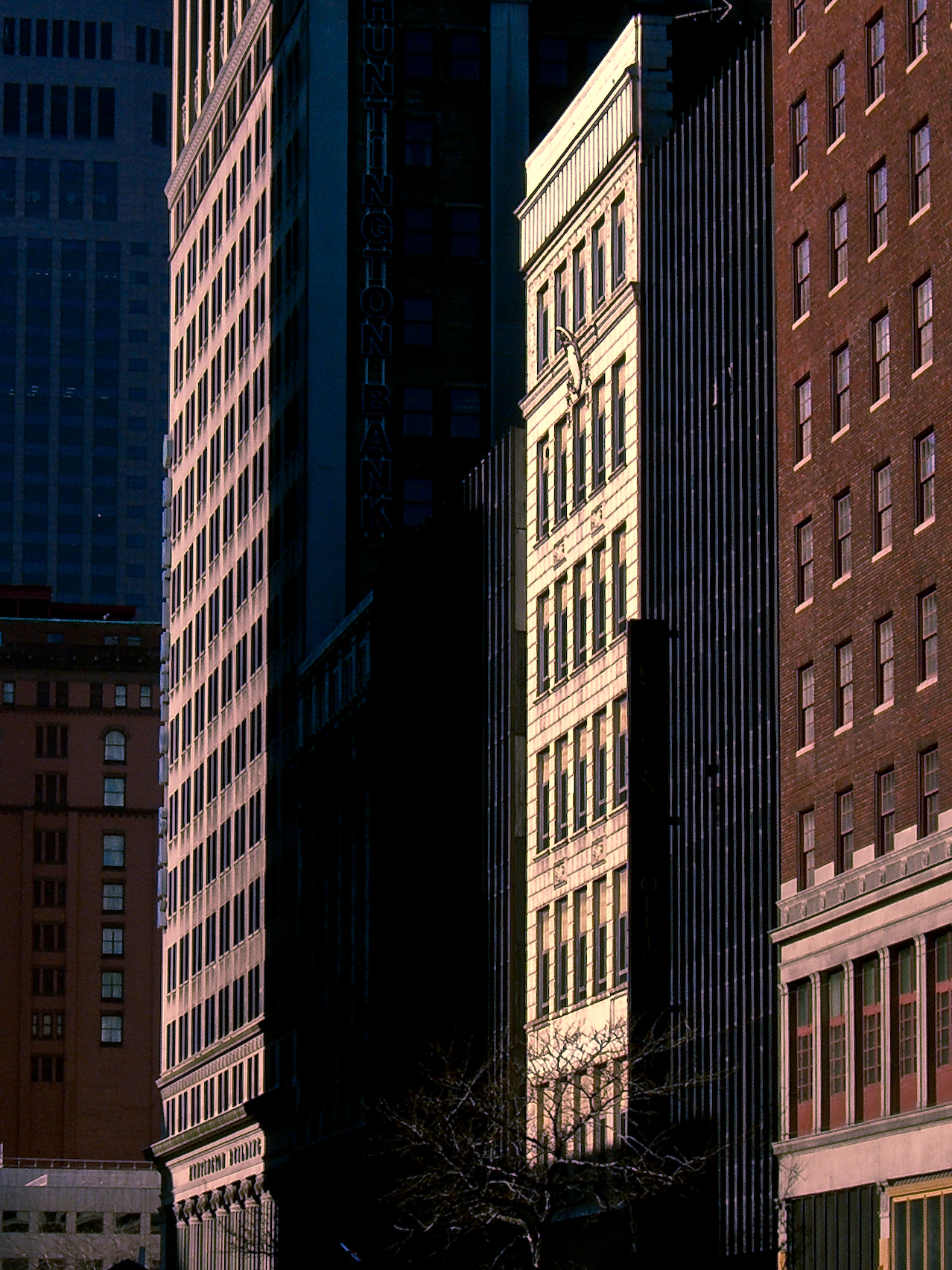
- High-rise facades on the north side of Euclid Avenue, just east of East 9th Street

- Location within Cleveland Location within Ohio Location within the United States
- Location: Roughly bounded by Public Square, Euclid Ave. to E. 17th St., and E. 21st St. (original); 205 St. Clair Ave., 1370 Ontario St., and 1796-1808 E. 13th St. (increase), 1835 to 1937 Prospect Ave. East (second increase), Cleveland, Ohio
- Coordinates: 41°30′2″N 81°41′12″W
- Area: 125 acres (51 ha) (original); 4 acres (1.6 ha) (increase)
- Architect: Knox and Elliot; Murgatroyd, Robert, and Odgen
- Architectural style: Late 19th and 20th Century Revivals, Late 19th and Early 20th Century American Movements
- NRHP reference No.: 02000702 (original); 07000524 (increase 1); 100007815 (increase 2)

Significant dates
- Added to NRHP: June 28, 2002
- Boundary increases: May 29, 2007; June 24, 2022

The Euclid Avenue Historic District is a historic district in downtown Cleveland, Ohio, United States. Established and listed on the National Register of Historic Places in 2002, it comprises 125 acres (51 ha) along Euclid Avenue and parallel streets from Public Square to East 21st Street. In 2007, another 4 acres (1.6 ha) was added to the district; the boundary increase included buildings exclusively located along parallel streets. it was again enlarged in 2022.
