= William Walsh (piper) =

William Walsh (1859 – after 1913) was an Irish piper.

Walsh was a native of Oughterard, County Galway, a Gaeilgeoir, and musically self-taught. He emigrated to the United States with his parents, eventually joining the Chicago police force. He participated and won the Gaelic Feis in that city in July 1912, and again in 1913.

He provided O'Neill with some information concerning obscure Connacht pipers:

"Through the kindness of Officer William Walsh of the Chicago police force, we present the names of some Connacht pipers unknown to fame, as they had never rambled beyond the confines of their native province. Though a native of Oughterard, County Galway, Officer Walsh is an accomplished "Highland piper," and a writer of pipe music."

"Between the fifties and eighties of the nineteenth century there rambled through the said county, "Paddy" Green, a blind piper from Tuam; "Paddy" Kilkenny, who hailed from Clifden; and John Lennan of Kilkerin, who achieved considerable repute throughout Connemara."

"Martin Moran was a native of County Mayo, and Charles Daly, though born in Clara, spent most of his time in Galway. There was another piper, known only by the name "Eunachaun," who for neatly thirty years enjoyed enviable popularity in Iarconnacht. No wedding or christening could be properly celebrated without the piper and his music in that district or in Connemara in the "good old times."
