= Pam Robinson =

American journalist

Pam Robinson is the co-founder, with Hank Glamann, of the American Copy Editors Society. She was born at Walter Reed Army Hospital in Washington, D.C., and grew up in Lorain, Ohio, a blue-collar city on Lake Erie, 27 miles west of Cleveland. The Robinson Prize for copy editors is named for her.

== Career ==
While a part-time sportswriter and student, she was assigned to cover a Southview High School football game at George Daniel Field in Lorain but was barred from using the press box because female sportswriters were not permitted. The reason cited was the bad language used by visiting coaches, though female members of the school board were admitted. The ban was lifted a week later after The Journal, her employer, objected.

She was a co-founder, and served as the first president of, the American Copy Editors Society (ACES), stepping down in 2001, and was succeeded by John Early McIntyre.

She is the owner and publisher of HuntingtonNow.com, covering the town of Huntington, New York.

The creation of ACES was spurred by a report of the American Society of Newspaper Editors citing dissatisfaction among copy editors, continued through gatherings of copy editors led by Dorothy Wilson and Beryl Adcock and such academic leaders as Bill Cloud, and influenced by industry executives, such as Bob Mong and Merv Aubespin. The professional journalism organization offers advice, collegiality, and training, including an annual national conference that has become well-known in the newspaper industry for its focus on valuable workshops.

Besides The Lorain Journal, now named The Morning Journal, she worked at the Danbury News-Times, Hartford Courant, New London Day, Newsday, The New York Times, and the Los Angeles Times. She also spent a year working for a refugee resettlement program run by the National Council of Churches.
