= Bill Walsh (firefighter) =

American actor and firefighter

- Born: William J. Walsh; September 25, 1957 (age 68); Brooklyn, New York

William J. Walsh (born September 25, 1957) is a retired New York City firefighter, known for his role in the television series Third Watch. In Third Watch, he started as a firefighter in seasons 1–4, Then in seasons 5–6, Walsh was promoted to the rank Lieutenant of Squad 55. Bill Walsh is a retired Captain of FDNY Squad 41 in the South Bronx.

He also made an appearance as the firefighter who helped Elmo in Sesame Street's Elmo Visits the Firehouse.
