= Bill Walsh (footballer) =

English footballer

Personal information
- Full name: William Walsh
- Date of birth: 4 December 1923
- Place of birth: Horden, County Durham, England
- Date of death: 28 July 2014 (aged 90)
- Place of death: Gold Coast, Queensland, Australia
- Position: Centre half

Senior career*
Years	Team	Apps	(Gls)
- Horden Colliery Welfare
1946–1953	Sunderland	98	(1)
1953–1954	Northampton Town	19	(0)
1954–1955	Darlington	28	(4)
–	Hakoah		
- * Club domestic league appearances and goals

William Walsh (4 December 1923 – 28 July 2014), known as Bill or Billy Walsh, was an English footballer who made 145 appearances in the Football League playing as a centre half for Sunderland, Northampton Town and Darlington.

Walsh began his career in non-league football with Horden Colliery Welfare, and made his competitive debut for Sunderland on 11 September 1946 against Charlton Athletic in a 5–0 defeat at The Valley. Overall, he went on to make 98 First Division appearances and scored one goal for the club in a career spanning from 1946 to 1953. He spent one season each with Northampton Town and Darlington, before emigrating to Australia in 1956, where he played for Hakoah.

Walsh was born in Horden, County Durham, and died in Gold Coast, Queensland, Australia.
