= ACES: The Society for Editing =

Professional organization for copy editors

- Founded: 1997; 29 years ago
- Founders: Pam Robinson, Hank Glamann
- Type: Professional association
- Purpose: Advocacy and training for editors
- Location: United States
- Origins: Developed from copy editors' meetings at American Society of News Editors (ASNE)
- Region served: United States, Canada, United Kingdom, and English-language editors worldwide
- Method: Conferences, webinars, publications, online resources
- Members: 5,083
- Key people: Mark Allen, president
- Employees: 4
- Volunteers: ~50
- Website: aceseditors.org
- Formerly called: American Copy Editors Society

ACES: The Society for Editing is a professional association of international scope for editors who work on every kind of content, including newspapers, magazines, websites, books, scholarly journals, and corporate communications.

As of 2025, the group offered:

- an annual in-person conference
- an annual virtual conference
- member networking opportunities
- a newsletter
- scholarships (via the affiliated ACES Education Fund)
- regional workshops
- a website that offers educational materials, news, job listings, and an editors-for-hire board

ACES was formerly known as – and, as of 2018, is still legally incorporated as – the American Copy Editors Society, a registered 501(c)(3) nonprofit corporation.

== Executive committee ==
ACES was founded in 1997, by Pam Robinson, who also served as its first president, and Hank Glamann. Its inception followed the work of the American Society of News Editors (at the time, the American Society of Newspaper Editors) and meetings by copy editors in North Carolina and South Carolina. It is currently led by society president Heather E. Saunders of Nova Arc Content Co. She follows Neil Holdway of the Daily Herald and Sara Ziegler of FiveThirtyEight. John McIntyre of The Baltimore Sun was its second president. Chris Wienandt of the Dallas Morning News was its third president. Teresa Schmedding of the Daily Herald of Arlington Heights, Ill., was its fourth president.

ACES is governed by an elected board of directors consisting of five officers, eight board members-at-large, the president of the ACES Education Fund (ex officio), and the past president (non-voting member). Any full member is eligible for elections. Annual membership is $100 for full members and $50 for students.

In 2008, the board approved changes that allowed copy editors working outside traditional journalism organizations full membership with voting rights. As of early 2023, the society had over 5,000 members.

== Awards ==
ACES: The Society for Editing offers numerous scholarships, fellowships, and awards to various editors annually.

ACES honors two editors each year for their outstanding editing abilities. The awards are named after its founders: the Robinson Prize, which honors an outstanding editor, and the Glamann Award, which honors contributions to the craft.

ACES offers annual scholarships to up-and-coming student editors awarded to 6 students annually.

The Richard S. Holden Diversity Fellowship is awarded to editors who show extraordinary promise in their fields. In addition to scholarship funds, the winners are given leadership and opportunities to advance their skills and careers.

ACES also has hosted the annual National Grammar Day Tweeted Poetry Contest, a poem-writing contest celebrating National Grammar Day, March 4.

== In-Person Conferences ==
The ACES national conference features the fundamentals of the craft and a primer for what's to come. Each year, editors from all fields come together for three days of workshops, panel discussions, and networking. Attendees include editors for newspapers, magazines, websites, trade publications, book publishers, nonprofit agencies, and corporations, as well as students, journalism professors, consultants, and freelancers.

The idea that led to the creation of ACES was nurtured during a series of three conferences about copy editing sponsored by the American Society of News Editors in 1995 and 1996.

When ACES was chartered in the spring of 1997, the top priority of the society's founders was to conduct their own national gathering. Four months later, the first ACES national conference took place at the University of North Carolina at Chapel Hill.

=== Upcoming Conferences ===
- April 26-29, 2027: San Juan, Puerto Rico

=== Past Conferences ===
Year	Location	Attendance
1997	Chapel Hill, NC	347
1998	Portland, OR	400
1999	Dallas, TX	525
2000	Baltimore, MD	425
2001	Long Beach, CA	440
2002	Louisville, KY	354
2003	Chicago, IL	410
2004	Houston, TX	390
2005	Hollywood, CA	504
2006	Cleveland, OH	420
2007	Miami, FL	368
2008	Denver, CO	297
2009	Minneapolis, MN	256
2010	Philadelphia, PA	331
2011	Phoenix, AZ	297
2012	New Orleans, LA	354
2013	St. Louis, MO	379
2014	Las Vegas, NV	335
2015	Pittsburgh, PA	483
2016	Portland, OR	626
2017	St. Petersburg, FL	555
2018	Chicago, IL	710
2019	Providence, RI	829
2020	Canceled due to COVID-19	n/a
2021	Canceled due to COVID-19	n/a
2022	San Antonio, TX	400+
2023	Columbus, OH	400+
2024	San Diego, CA	500+
2025	Salt Lake City, UT	530
2026	Atlanta, GA	550+
