= Institutio Oratoria =

Textbook on the theory and practice of rhetoric by Quintilian

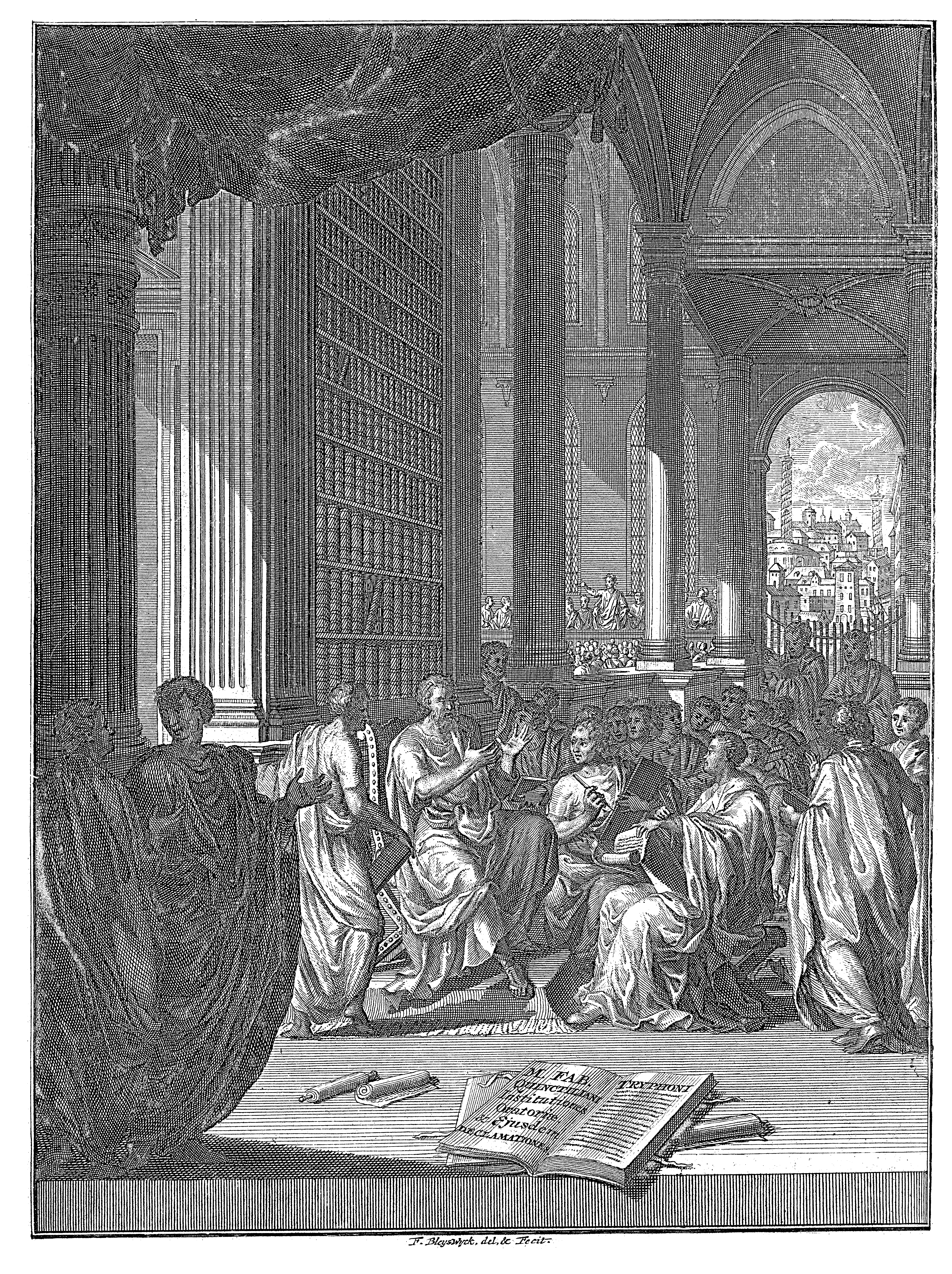
Frontispiece of a 1720 edition of the Institutio Oratoria, showing Quintilan teaching rhetoric

Institutio Oratoria (English: Institutes of Oratory) is a twelve-volume textbook on the theory and practice of rhetoric by Roman rhetorician Quintilian. It was published around year 95 AD. The work deals also with the foundational education and development of the orator himself.

== Introduction ==
Quintilian wrote his book during the last years of the reign of Emperor Domitian. In the tradition of several Roman emperors, such as Nero and Caligula, Domitian's regime grew harsher as time went on. “[An] active secret police preyed on the Roman population, and even senators were encouraged in various ways to inform on each other ... under Domitian, even the slightest suspicion of disrespect for the emperor became a capital crime” (xx). Social and political corruption were rife. In a move of utmost irony, the debauched Domitian appointed himself “censor perpetuus, making himself responsible for public morals” (xx).

Against this backdrop, it was very difficult to find orators in the tradition of Cicero, part of whose "fame as an orator stems from his public denunciations of enemies of the state" (XIX). Such positions were simply too dangerous to take during the reign of the emperors since Augustus. Therefore, the role of the orator had changed since Cicero's day. Now, they were more concerned with pleading cases than anything else. Into this time, Quintilian attempted to interject some of the idealism of an earlier time. “Political oratory was dead, and everyone in Rome knew it was dead; but Quintilian deliberately chooses the oratory of a past generation as his educational ideal” (Gwynn, 188).

For hundreds of years during the Middle Ages, European scholars only knew about the Institutio from quotations in other works and little fragments that they recovered. However, a complete copy was found in 1416 in the Monastery of St. Gall (St. Gallen), Switzerland:

In September, 1416, the Italian humanist and book-hunter Poggio Bracciolini visited a Benedictine monastery in St. Gall, Switzerland. There he found—not in a library but in a dungeon which he declared was not fit for a condemned man—the first complete copy of Quintilian’s Institutio Oratoria (Orator’s Education, 95 CE) that any scholar had seen for nearly six centuries. Suddenly aware that it was a valuable book, the German monks refused to let Poggio take it away, so he was forced to sit down and copy it by hand over the next 54 days. The reaction to the discovery among humanists, especially in Italy, was swift and fervent. Leonardo Aretino wrote, “I entreat you, my dear Poggio, send me the manuscript as soon as possible, that I may see it before I die”

— James J. Murphy, "A Quintilian Anniversary and Its Meaning", Advances in the History of Rhetoric Volume 19, 2016 - Issue 2: An Ancient Master Teacher Speaks to the Modern World: What Quintilian Can Tell Us About Modern Pedagogy (June 2016)

== Contents overview ==
=== Overview of Books I–II ===
In the first two books, Quintilian focuses on the early education of the would-be orator, including various subjects he should be skilled in, such as reading and composition. “He offers us indeed not so much a theory as a curriculum. For instance in ch. iv of Book I he discusses certain letters, the derivation of words, and parts of speech; in ch. v, the necessity of correctness in speaking and writing, choice of words, barbarisms, aspiration, accent, solecisms, figures of speech, foreign words, and compound words; in ch. vi, analogy, and in ch. viii, orthography” (Laing). Regarding the age at which the orator's training should begin, Quintilian refers to the views of Hesiod and Eratosthenes, but accepts Chrysippus’ view that a child’s life should never be without education (Quintilian 1.1.15–19).

Quintilian sees these formative years as the most critical to the education of an orator: “The infancy of the mind is as important as the infancy of the body and needs as much attention” (Quintilian 1.1.1–24). The role of the orator's nurse is greatly emphasized as “it is she that the boy will hear first, [and] it is her words that he will imitate” (Laing, 519). Parents play an equally important role, their education being a determining factor in the orator's progress. Thirdly, the paedagogus, (the slave who attends the young orator) “must be well educated and ready at all times to correct errors in grammar” (Laing, 520). Finally, Quintilian stresses that the orator should be educated by “the most accomplished teacher” (1.1.22). This ideal teacher is described in detail in (2.2.5).

In Book II, Quintilian defines rhetoric as an art, while classifying the three types of arts: theoretical, practical, and productive (2.17–18). He concludes that rhetoric partakes of all three categories, but associates it most strongly with the practical (2.18.1–5). Rhetoric is also divided into three categories: (1) art, (2) artist, and (3) work (2.14.5). Quintilian then moves into an exploration of rhetoric's nature and virtue, following it with a comparison of oratory and philosophy (2.19–21). It should also be noted that Quintilian uses these two terms, rhetoric and oratory, interchangeably (see Book II).

=== Overview of Books III–V ===
Books III-IX explore and develop the various types of oratory, focusing on the structure and methods of persuasion. Thus, these books are “concerned primarily with the art of rhetoric” (Walzer, 40).

In Book III, Quintilian begins with an apology to his readers for the dry, technical nature of his writing (3.1). The following chapters discuss the origins of rhetoric (3.2), as well as its nature and various divisions (3.3). Quintilian then asks whether there are more than three types of oratory (3.4) before discussing cause (3.5) and the status of a cause (3.6). Three overarching forms of oratory are discussed: panegyric (3.7), deliberative (3.8), and forensic (3.9).

A significant portion of the text is structured around Cicero's 5 canons of rhetoric: Books III to VI concern the process of invention, arrangement in Book VII, and style in Books VIII and IX. In Book IV, Quintilian discusses Cicero's parts of an oration (4.1–5). Book V is largely a discussion of proofs, designated as artificial or unartificial (5.1).

=== Overview of Book VI ===
The central theme of Book VI is laughter, and it is discussed extensively in chapter three. Aristotle's three artistic appeals, ethos, pathos, and logos, are also discussed in Book VI (6.2).

=== Overview of Books VII–IX ===
Book VII covers arrangement, one of Cicero's 5 canons of rhetoric. Style is discussed in Books VIII and IX.

=== Overview of Book X ===
In Book X, Quintilian surveys the past contributions of Latin and Greek authors to rhetoric (10.1). Following this discussion, Quintilian argues that the orator should imitate the best authors if he wishes to be successful (10.1.5), "For there can be no doubt that in art no small portion of our task lies in imitation, since, although invention came first and is all-important, it is expedient to imitate whatever has been invented with success" (10.2.1). Writing is then discussed (10.3), followed by correction (10.4), varied forms of composition: translation, paraphrase, theses, commonplaces, and declamations (10.5), premeditation (10.6), and improvisation (10.7).

=== Overview of Book XI ===
In Book XI, Quintilian emphasizes the orator's choice of appropriate subject matter at varying times (11.1). He further stresses the role of the audience within oratory: "Their power and rank will make no small difference; we shall employ different methods according as we are speaking before the emperor, a magistrate, a senator, a private citizen, or merely a free man, while a different tone is demanded by trials in the public courts, and in cases submitted to arbitration" (11.1.43). Also discussed are the orator's memory (11.2) and delivery (11.3), the final canons of Aristotle's rhetoric.

=== Overview of Book XII ===
Book XII addresses the career of the educated orator after he has completed his training. In the preface, Quintilian expresses, for the first time, that he is theorizing beyond the work of others:

Now there is "Nothing before and nothing behind but the sky and the Ocean." One only can I discern in all of the boundless waste of waters, Marcus Tullius Cicero, and even he, though the ship in which he entered the seas is of such size and so well found, begins to lessen sail and to row a slower stroke, and is content to speak merely of the kind of speech to be employed by the perfect orator. But my temerity is such that I shall essay to form my orator's character and to teach him his duties. Thus I have no predecessor to guide my steps and must press far, far on, as my theme may demand (Quintilian 12.Pref.4).

Above all else, Quintilian advocates that a good orator must be a vir bonus, a good man (12.1.1). To aid the orator in becoming a good man, Quintilian discusses methods for influencing his character, coupled with the study of philosophy (12.2). Quintilian then emphasizes the study of civic law as essential to orator's ability to advise the state (12.3). Also discussed are the orator's ability to draw from past and present examples (12.4), as well as a certain "loftiness of the soul" that situates the orator above fear (12.5.1). Quintilian does not offer a specific age at which the orator should begin to plead; he reasons that this age "will of course depend on the development of his strength" (12.6.2). The orator's careful selection of cases is then discussed, alongside the question of payment (12.7). In (12.8), Quintilian stresses that the orator must devote time and effort to his study of cases. But above his other duties, Quintilian makes clear that the orator "should never, like so many, be led by a desire to win applause to neglect the interest of the actual case" (12.9.1). Lastly, Quintilian compares various styles of Greek and Roman oratory (especially Atticism and the Asiatic style), also commenting on artistic styles of painting and sculpture (12.10). As he concludes, Quintilian discusses when the orator should retire and examines the possible advantages of such a career. His final words urge the orator to devote himself fully to the task: "Therefore let us seek with all our hearts that true majesty of oratory, the fairest gift of god to man, without which all things are stricken dumb and robbed alike of present glory and the immortal record of posterity; and let us press forward to whatsoever is best, since, if we do this, we shall either reach the summit or at least see many others far beneath us" (12.11.30).

== On rhetoric ==
In Quintilian's time, rhetoric was primarily composed of three aspects: the theoretical, the educational, and the practical. Institutio Oratoria does not claim originality; Quintilian drew from a number of sources in compiling his work. This eclecticism also prevented him from adhering too rigidly to any particular school of thought on the matter, although Cicero stands out among the other sources. Quintilian also refused any short, simple lists of rules; he evidently felt that the study and art of rhetoric could not be so reduced. This might explain the length of Institutio Oratoria, which consists of twelve books.

From the middle of the first century BC to Quintilian's time, there had been a flowering of Roman rhetoric. But by Quintilian's time, the current of popular taste in oratory was rife with what has been called "silver Latin," a style that favored ornate embellishment over clarity and precision. Quintilian's Institutio Oratoria can in many ways be read as a reaction against this trend; it advocates a return to simpler and clearer language. It may also reflect the influence of the late Emperor Vespasian, who was “[a] man of plebeian stock, ... a down-to-earth realist with the common touch” (Murray, 431); Vespasian disliked excess and extravagance, and his patronage of Quintilian may have influenced the latter's views of language. Cicero is the model Quintilian adopts as the standard-bearer for this form; during the previous century, Cicero's far more concise style was the standard. This relates to his discussion of nature and art. Quintilian evidently preferred the natural, especially in language, and disliked the excessive ornamentation popular in the style of his contemporaries. Deviating from natural language and the natural order of thought in pursuit of an over-elaborate style created confusion in both the orator and his audience. “Even difficult questions can be dealt with by an orator of moderate ability if he is content to follow nature as his leader and does not give all his attention to a showy style” (Gwynn, 78).

Institutio Oratoria is effectively a comprehensive textbook of the technical aspects of rhetoric. From the eleventh chapter of Book II to the end of Book XI, Quintilian covers such topics as natural order, the relation of nature and art, invention, proof, emotion, and language. Perhaps most influential among the ideas discussed is his examination of tropes and figures, found in Books 8 and 9. “[A] trope involves the substitution of one word for another, a figure does not necessarily entail any change either to the order or the meaning of words” (Leitch, 156). An example of a trope would be metaphor, the altering of a word's meaning. A figure, on the other hand, gives the words a new aspect or greater emotional value. Figures are divided into figures of thought, which may make proof seem more forceful, intensify emotions, or add elegance or ornamentation; and figures of diction, which is further subdivided into “the grammatical, in which the form of the word creates the figure, and the rhetorical, in which the position of the word is the primary factor” (Gwynn, 88).

A good part of this work, of course, deals with the technical aspects of rhetoric and the Institutio Oratoria stands — along with Aristotle's 'Rhetoric' and Cicero's works — as one of the ancient world's greatest works on rhetoric. He organizes the practice of oratory into five canons: inventio (discovery of arguments), dispositio (arrangement of arguments), elocutio (expression or style), memoria (memorization), and pronuntiatio (delivery). For each canon, particularly the first three, he provides a thorough exposition of all the elements that must be mastered and considered in developing and presenting arguments. The thorough and sensible presentation reflect his long experience as orator and teacher, and in many ways the work can be seen as the culmination of Greek and Roman rhetorical theory.

Throughout these and other discussions, Quintilian remains concerned with the practical, applicable aspect, rather than the theoretical. Unlike many modern theorists, he “does not see figurative language as a threat to the stability of linguistic reference” (Leitch, 156). The referential use of a word was always the primary meaning, and the use of figurative language was merely an addition to it, not a replacement for it.

== On education ==
“My aim, then, is the education of the perfect orator” (Quintilianus, 1.Preface.9). Book I of Institutio Oratoria discusses at length the proper method of training an orator, virtually from birth. This focus on early and comprehensive education was in many ways a reflection of Quintilian's career; Emperor Vespasian's influence on the official status of education marked the period as one of conscientious education. Quintilian's contribution to this line of thought, aside from his long career as a public educator, was the opening of his text, and it is regarded as a highlight of the discussion:

“Quintilian’s Institutio Oratoria is a landmark in the history of Roman education: it is the culmination of a long development, and it had no successor … [No] teacher was found who could speak with Quintilian’s authority, no orator sufficiently interested in the theory of his art to produce a second de Oratore” (Gwynn, 242).

His theory of education is one area in which Quintilian differs from Cicero. Cicero called for a broad, general education; Quintilian was more focused. He lays out the educational process step by step, from “hav[ing] a father conceive the highest hopes of his son from the moment of his birth” (Quintilianus, 1.1.1). Other concerns are that the child's nurse should speak well (“The ideal according to Chrysippus, would be that she should be a philosopher” (1.1.4)), and that both the parents and the teachers of the child should be well-educated. With respect to the parents, Quintilian “do[es] not restrict this remark to fathers alone” (1.1.6); a well-educated mother is regarded as an asset to the growing orator. Quintilian also presents a wide review of suitable literary examples, and this work is also an important work of literary criticism. While he clearly favours certain writers, his fairness is notable, as even writers, such as Sallust, an influential practitioner of the sort of style that Quintilian opposed, are afforded some consideration. Above all, Quintilian holds up Cicero as an example of a great writer and orator.

Quintilian discusses many issues of education that are still relevant today. He believed that education should be begun early, as mentioned above, but also that it should be pleasurable for the child. “Above all things we must take care that the child, who is not yet old enough to love his studies, does not come to hate them and dread the bitterness which he had once tasted, even when the years of infancy are left behind. His studies must be made an amusement” (1.1.20). The proliferation of educational toys available for pre-school aged children shows that this view still has power. He also examines the various pros and cons of public schooling versus homeschooling, eventually coming out in favour of public school, so long as it is a good school. His view is that in public schools students can learn from what is taught to and praised and censured in their peers in the group instead of only those things directed entirely at themselves. (1.2.21) One must note, however, that Quintilian makes a point of declaring that “a good teacher will not burden himself with a larger number of pupils than he can manage, and it is further of the very first importance that he should be on only friendly and intimate terms with us and make his teaching not a duty but a labor of love” (1.2.15).

Quintilian's most arresting point about the growing orator, however, is that he should be educated in morality above all else. To Quintilian, only a good man could be an orator. This is another aspect where he differs from Cicero, or rather pushes further Cicero's injunction that an orator should be a good man. Quintilian quite literally believed that an evil man could not be an orator, “[f]or the orator’s aim is to carry conviction, and we trust those only whom we know to be worthy of our trust” (Gwynn, 231). This was quite possibly a reaction to the corrupt and dissolute times in which Quintilian lived; he may have attributed the decline in the role of the orator to the decline in public morality. Only a man free from vice could concentrate on the exacting study of oratory. But “the good man does not always speak the truth or even defend the better cause…what matters is not so much the act as the motive” (Clarke, 117). Therefore, Quintilian's good orator is personally good, but not necessarily publicly good.
