= Orator (Cicero) =

Rhetorical work by Cicero

Orator was written by Marcus Tullius Cicero in the latter part of the year 46 BC. It is his last work on rhetoric, three years before his death. Describing rhetoric, Cicero addresses previous comments on the five canons of rhetoric: Inventio, Dispositio, Elocutio, Memoria, and Pronuntiatio. In this text, Cicero attempts to describe the perfect orator, in response to Marcus Junius Brutus’ request. Orator is the continuation of a debate between Brutus and Cicero, which originated in his text Brutus, written earlier in the same year.

The oldest partial text of Orator was recovered in the monastery of Mont Saint-Michel and now is located in the library at Avranches. Thirty-seven existing manuscripts have been discovered from this text. Another complete text was discovered in 1421, near Milan in the town of Lodi. The texts of these two manuscripts vary considerably, and modern translators rely on both.

In 46 BC, when Cicero wrote Orator, many young Roman men revolted against the stylistic paradigms put forward by Cicero, and from most Roman traditions in general. Cicero writes in a defensive posture to this hostile audience.

== Context and summary ==
In Orator, Cicero depicts several models for speakers. Cicero states to the Romans the importance of searching and discovering their own sense of rhetoric. “I am sure, the magnificence of Plato did not deter Aristotle from writing, nor did Aristotle with all his marvelous breadth of knowledge put an end to the studies of others.” Cicero encouraged the plebeians through his writing, “Moreover, not only were outstanding men not deterred from undertaking liberal pursuits, but even craftsmen did not give up their arts because they were unable to equal the beauty of the picture of Ialysus . . . .” Cicero proposes that rhetoric cannot be confined to one specific group but rather outlines a guide that will lead to the creation of successful orators across Roman society.

In Orator, Cicero also addressed the accusation lodged by his fellow senators, including Brutus, that he was an “Atticist.” Cicero addresses this claim by saying that he is too independent and bold to be associated with Atticism, producing his own unique style. Cicero claims the perfect orator creates his own “elocutio,” or diction and style, rather than following this movement.

Cicero states that all five canons are equally important. Throughout the text, Cicero advises his Roman audience on how to form proper oratory by formal guidelines but also how to specialize individually in their own sense of oratory. Orator is written with ideas ranging from the construction of arguments to rhetorical performance. In relation to other Ciceronian works on rhetoric, Orator receives less treatment with scarce research compared to other rhetorical works.

== Goals of the orator ==
The three aims of the orator, according to Cicero, are "docere, delectare, et movere." That is: to prove your thesis to the audience, to delight the audience, and to emotionally move the audience. The emotional vividness of poetic language becomes part of the rhetorical tools in service of persuading the audience to your point of view.
