= Canon (basic principle) =

Group of official, authentic or approved rules or laws

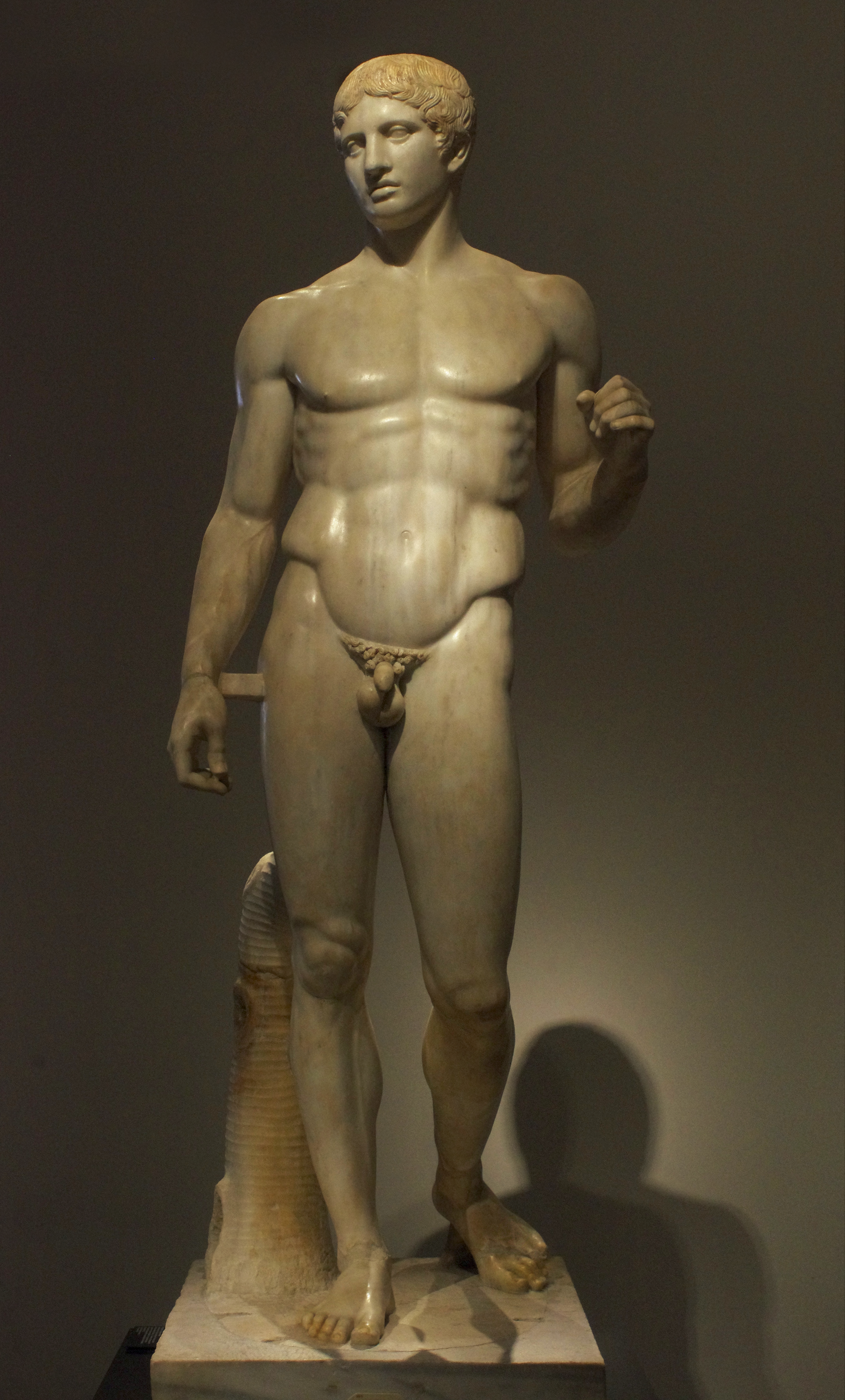
A well-preserved Roman period copy of Doryphoros, the archetype of the Canon of Polykleitos

The term canon derives from the Greek κανών (kanon), meaning "rule", and thence via Latin and Old French into English. The concept in English usage is very broad: in a general sense it refers to being one (adjectival) or a group (noun) of official, authentic or approved rules or laws, particularly ecclesiastical; or group of official, authentic, or approved literary or artistic works, such as the literature of a particular author, of a particular genre, or a particular group of religious scriptural texts; or similarly, one or a body of rules, principles, or standards accepted as axiomatic and universally binding in a religion, or a field of study or art.

== Examples ==
This principle of grouping has led to more specific uses of the word in different contexts, such as the Biblical canon (which a particular religious community regards as authoritative) and thence to literary canons (of a particular "body of literature in a particular language, or from a particular culture, period, genre").

W.C Sayers (1915–1916) established a system of canons of library classification.

S. R. Ranganathan developed a theory of facet analysis, which he presented as a detailed series of 46 canons, 13 postulates and 22 principles.

There is also the concept of the canons of rhetoric, including five key principles that, when grouped together, are the principles set for giving speeches.

== See also ==
- Artistic canons of body proportions – Criteria used in formal figurative art
  - Canon of Lysippos – 4th-century BC Greek sculptor
  - Canon of Polykleitos – Fifth century BCE Greek sculptor
- Axiom: a statement that is taken to be true, to serve as a starting point for further reasoning and arguments.
- Canon (fiction) – Continuity between different fictional works
- Canon law – Set of ordinances and regulations made by ecclesiastical authority
- Canonical – Standard or referential form
- Der Kanon – Canon of exemplary German literature, chosen by Marcel Reich-Ranicki
- Norm (philosophy): concepts (sentences) of practical import, oriented to effecting an action
- Principle: rule that has to be followed or is an inevitable consequence of something, such as the laws observed in nature
- Rule of inference: in logic, a logical form consisting of a function which takes premises, analyzes their syntax, and returns a conclusion (or conclusions)
- Rhetoric: the art of persuasion. The five canons of rhetoric or phases of developing a persuasive speech were first codified in classical Rome: invention, arrangement, style, memory, and delivery.
- Western canon: the body of literature, music, philosophy, and works of art that is highly valued in Western culture
