= Composition (language) =

Assembling words and sentences into a work

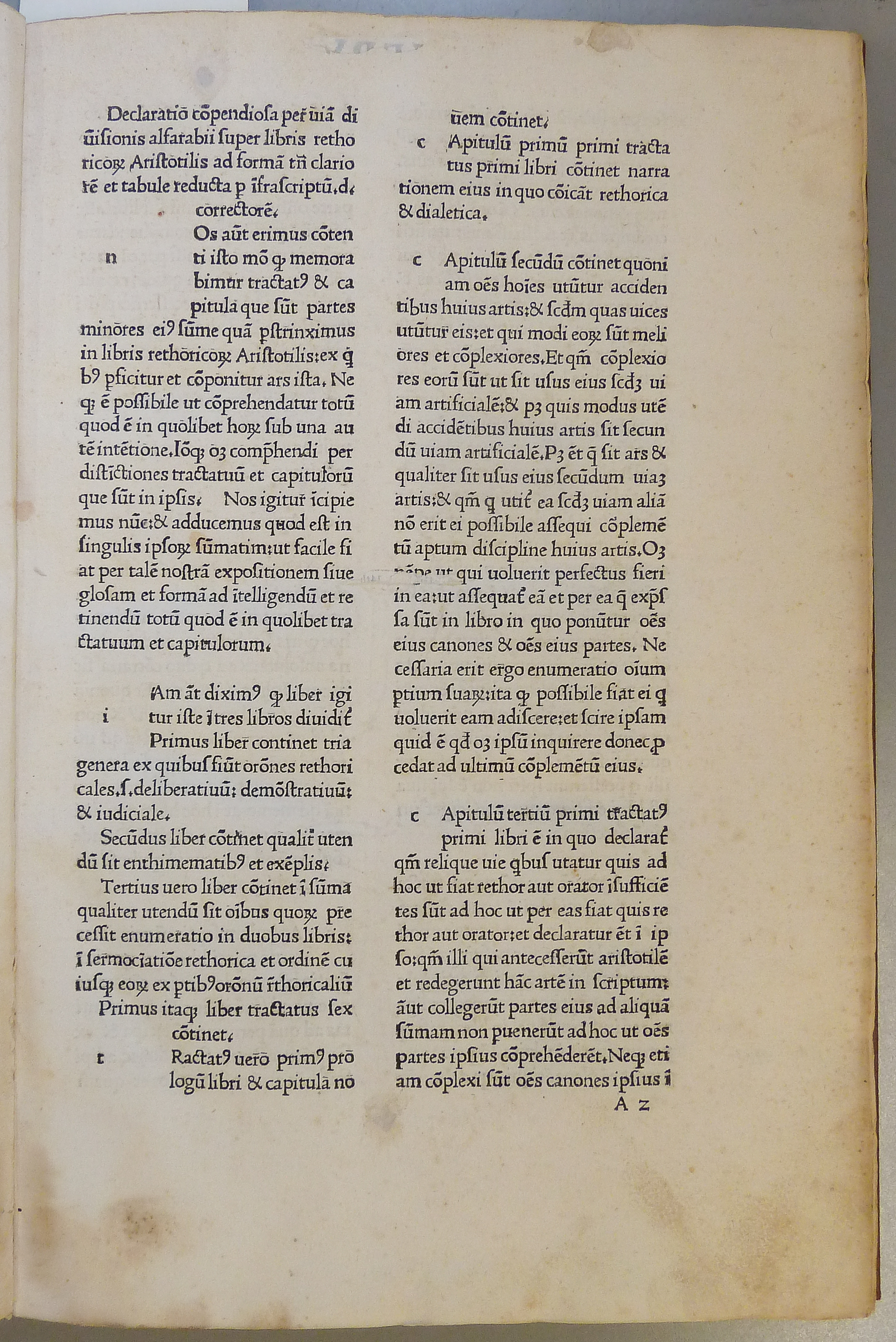
A copy of Aristotle's Rhetoric, printed in one of the earliest stages of the printing press.

The term composition (from Latin com- "with" and ponere "to place") as it refers to writing, can describe authors' decisions about, processes for designing, and sometimes the final product of, a composed linguistic work. In original use, it tended to describe practices concerning the development of oratorical performances, and eventually essays, narratives, or genres of imaginative literature, but since the mid-20th century emergence of the field of composition studies, its use has broadened to apply to any composed work: print or digital, alphanumeric or multimodal. As such, the composition of linguistic works goes beyond the exclusivity of written and oral documents to visual and digital arenas.

== Elements of composition ==
Theoretical and applied studies in narratology, rhetoric, and composition studies have identified elements like the following as relevant to processes of composing language. This list is neither exclusive nor sequential:

- Goal, the desired aims or objectives to be achieved by the end of composition
- Outline, the organisation of thoughts and/or ideas which is used to project sequence and arrangement
- Plot, the course or arrangement of events
- Theme, the unifying subject or idea
- Dialogue, a reciprocal conversation between two or more persons
- Characterisation, the process of creating characters
- Setting, the time and location in which the composition takes place
- Description, definitions of things in the composition
- Style, specifically, the linguistic style of the composition
- Setting tone or mood, conveying one or more emotions or feelings through words
- Voice, the individual writing style of the author
- Tone, which encompasses the attitudes toward the subject and toward the audience
- Justification, or reasoning in support of the topic
- Arrangement, strategic use of written, oral, visual and/or digital to inform, persuade, or motivate an audience in a given situation.

== Oral discourse ==
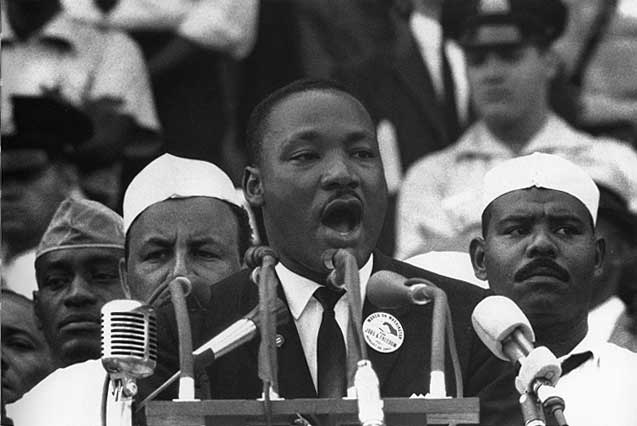
Martin Luther King Jr. performing oral discourse in his famous "I Have a Dream" speech.

Traditionally, oratory, or classical rhetoric, is composed of five stages, or canons:

- Invention, "the search of persuasive ways to present information and formulate arguments"
- Arrangement, "the organization of the parts of speech to ensure that all means of persuasion are present and properly disposed"
- Style, "the use of correct, appropriate, and striking language throughout the speech"
- Memory, "the use of mnemonics and practice of speech"
- Delivery, "the use of effective gestures and vocal modulation to present the speech"

Typically, in any speech classroom, these stages are still prevalent in the composing process. Other such qualities to be included, especially when considering ones' audience and methods of persuasion, would be the rhetorical appeals:

- Logos, appeals to logic and reason, evidence and support
- Ethos, appeals to ethics, the speaker's credibility, trustworthiness, and morals
- Pathos, appeals to emotion, connecting with audience through shared feelings
- Kairos, appeals to timing, presenting key information at the best moment, typically to persuade or to provoke action.

== Written discourse ==
As oral discourse shifted to more written discourse, the stage of memory and delivery began to fade, yet the first three stages hold its rank in the writing process of most composition classrooms. The rhetorical appeals also prove important in written texts, as the strategies of using these appeals become more complex as writers understand their audience's needs when not in physical view.

== Visual ==
While, strictly speaking, even a printed page of text is multimodal, the teaching of composition has begun to attend to the language of visuals. Some have suggested privileging only the linguistic mode limits the opportunity to engage in multiple symbols that create meaning and speak rhetorically. In thinking about how visuals are used to communicate, and how they are composed or analyzed in a rhetorical work, Foss argues that one considers:

- Nature, the present elements/physical features and suggested elements/concepts and ideas
- Function, the action it communicates
- Evaluation, assessed rhetorically

Foss, who acknowledges visual rhetoric, demonstrates that composition studies has to consider other definitions and incorporations of language.

== Digital ==
This composition refers to work produced in digital spaces. The writer or speaker must not only consider all the composing processes of the above-mentioned discourse (like purpose, arrangement, etc.), but the relationship medium plays in the composing and decision process of that work. In digital discourse, the fifth canon of delivery takes on new meaning, and digital spaces change how traditional views of authority, circulation, and context are understood, like composing in a Wikipedia. Thus digital rhetoric, or eRhetoric offers new ways of composing.

== See also ==
- Composition studies
- Conference on College Composition and Communication
- Creative writing
- Kishotenketsu
- Non-linear writing
- Writing process
