= Gilbert Austin =

Irish educator, clergyman and author

Gilbert Austin (1753–1837) was an Irish educator, clergyman and author. Austin is best known for his 1806 book on chironomia, Chironomia, or a Treatise on Rhetorical Delivery. Heavily influenced by classical writers, Austin stressed the importance of voice and gesture to a successful oration.

== Biography ==
Gilbert Austin was born in 1753 in County Louth, Ireland. Educated at Trinity College, Dublin, Austin received his Bachelor of Arts degree in 1774 and his Master of Arts degree in 1780. After graduating, Austin established a private school in Dublin where he taught the sons of Ireland's elite, including Augustus Frederick FitzGerald, later the third Duke of Leinster. Austin inscribed his best-known work, Chironomia, or a Treatise on Rhetorical Delivery, to another of his former pupils, Francis Caulfeild, 2nd Earl of Charlemont.

An active member of the Royal Irish Academy, Austin wrote several scientific papers describing his inventions. In 1789, Austin edited and published a collection of poems by Irish writer Thomas Dermody. Austin also published a number of his sermons, including the collection Sermons on Practical Subjects. Austin began work on his most famous book, Chironomia, in the 1770s but it was not published until 1806.

Austin held several clerical appointments in the Church of Ireland. In 1798, Austin became a minor canon of St. Patrick's Cathedral, Dublin. From 1816 until his death in 1837, Austin was Vicar of Laraghbryan (or Maynooth), a living to which he was presented by his former pupil, the Duke of Leinster. Austin also held the prebendary of Blackrath from 1821 to 1835. He served as chaplain to the Magdalen Asylum, Leeson-Street, Dublin.

== Works ==
=== Scientific articles ===
Between 1790 and 1803, Austin published three articles in the Transactions of the Royal Irish Academy. Philippa Spoel writes that "these articles, which describe the construction and application of chemical apparatus invented by Austin, demonstrate his involvement...with the flourishing field of chemistry." The inventions Austin described include a portable barometer, a mechanism for filling water with carbon dioxide, and an apparatus for collecting gasses over water and mercury. In 1813, Austin published "On a New Construction of a Condenser and Air-Pump" in the Philosophical Transactions of the Royal Society of London.

=== Sermons and other writings ===
In 1789, Austin edited and published Thomas Dermody's first collection of poetry. In 1794, Austin published a 36-page tract titled A Sermon on a Future State: Combating the Opinion that "Death is Eternal Sleep." Edgar Allan Poe, fifty years later, wryly described this tract as "nearly, if not quite the best, 'Essay on a Future State.' " Austin published Sermons on Practical Subjects in 1795 and A Sermon for the Support of Mercer's Hospital in 1796.

== Chironomia, or a Treatise on Rhetorical Delivery ==
In the preface to Chironomia, Austin writes:

...it is a fact that we do not possess from the ancients, nor yet from the labours of our own countrymen, any sufficiently detailed and precise precepts for the fifth division of the art of rhetoric, namely rhetorical delivery, called by the ancients actio and pronuntiatio.

Austin observed that British orators were skilled in the first four divisions of rhetoric: inventio, dispositio, elocutio, and memoria. However, the fifth division, pronuntiatio or delivery, was all but ignored. Delivery, which is often improperly referred to as elocution (elocutio), concerns the use of voice and gesture in an oration. Rather than study the art of delivery, orators trusted to the inspiration of the moment to guide their voices and gestures. Austin describes this as a reliance on "gestures imperfectly conceived...which will consequently be imperfectly executed."

Chironomia is a treatise on the importance of good delivery. Good delivery, Austin notes, can "conceal in some degree the blemishes of the composition, or the matter delivered, and...add lustre to its beauties." In the first part of the book, Austin traces the study of the art of delivery from the classical world to the 18th century. The second part of the book is devoted to a description of the notation system Austin designed to teach students of rhetoric the management of gesture and voice. The system of notation is accompanied by a series of illustrations depicting positions of the feet, body and hands.

Throughout Chironomia, Austin instructs speakers to avoid the appearance of vulgarity or rusticity. Austin first developed the system of notation described in Chironomia at his school for privileged young men. Austin's goal was to prepare his students for a life in the church or politics by training them to become better orators. Although Austin's system was eventually dismissed as too rigidly prescriptive, Chironomia was a highly influential book during the 19th century.

=== Influences ===
Discussing the need for a treatise on delivery, Austin writes: "During my examination of modern writers, it has appeared to me, that, with little exception, they have neglected to pay due attention to the precepts and authority of the great and ancient masters." Austin remedies this oversight by compiling a collection of classical sources on the art of delivery. Austin was heavily influenced by Cicero and Quintilian. Cicero refers to action as the "language of the body" and to the art of delivery as "corporeal eloquence." Austin attributes to Quintilian the use of the word chironomia to refer to the art of gesture. In Chironomia, Austin quotes extensively from Cicero's De oratore and Quintilian's Institutio oratoria.

Austin also cites Ludovicus Cressolius's 1620 book Vacationes Autumales sive de perfecta Oratoris, Actione, et Pronuntiatione and the work of Caussinus as influences. Despite their use of the term elocution for the art which Austin calls delivery, Austin refers to Thomas Sheridan's Lectures on Elocution (1762) and John Walker's Elements of Elocution (1781) in his discussion of voice and countenance.

Austin's work would appear to be a direct descendant of John Bulwer's book Chirologia, or, the Natural Language of the Hand which, when it was published in 1644, also included Bulwer's work Chironomia; or, the Art of Manual Rhetoricke. However, Austin does not mention Bulwer anywhere in his own Chironomia, and may have been unfamiliar with Bulwer's book.

=== Voice and countenance ===
Austin was concerned with both the quality and management of the voice; he considered the former a gift of nature and the latter a matter of art (29). Austin developed rules for the management of articulation, pronunciation and emphasis. On articulation, Austin writes

[words] are to be delivered out from the lips, as beautiful coins newly issued from the mint, deeply and accurately impressed, perfectly finished, neatly struck by the proper organs, distinct, sharp, in due succession and of due weight. (38)

Austin agreed with Sheridan's advice that good articulation consisted of pronouncing each syllable distinctly and with proper emphasis (37). Austin's rules for pronunciation address the issue of the provincial accent, something Austin labels "a stain of rusticity" (47). Austin encouraged his students to rid themselves of their provincial accent in favour of a courtly accent.

In addition to his rules for the management of the voice, Austin also addresses issues of vocal quality including pitch, volume and variety. Austin was also concerned with the management of facial expression. Austin stresses the importance of using appropriate tones of voice, facial expressions and gestures to convey sincerity.

=== Gesture ===
Austin describes gesture as the "action and position of all the parts of the body" (133) and attributes to gesture the power to convey meaning. During the 18th century, speakers preferred the natural style of gesture but Austin warns against this style saying that speakers who rely on nature run the risk of displaying "the untutored extravagance and uncouth motions of the vulgar" (138 see Plate 2, Figures 8 and 9 below). By following Austin's guidelines, speakers could improve their delivery by matching their gestures to their words. Austin advises his students, however, that gesture should be used with restraint and only when appropriate (137).

=== System of notation ===
Austin's system of notation begins with the placement of the body in an imaginary sphere (see Plate 2, Fig. 18 below). The speaker then moves his or her body, feet or hands toward one of the points on the sphere. Each movement is assigned a notation that specifies the direction and manner in which the speaker should move. The speaker should include these notations in the text of his or her speech so that he or she knows when and how to move. Notation regarding the hands is written above the sentence; notation regarding the feet is written below. For instance, the notation Bcl. e f sh. above a word indicates that the speaker should clasp both hands and extend them forward at shoulder height in a shaking motion (see Plate 8, Fig. 75 below). The notation L 1 x under a word indicates that the speaker should advance the left foot and bend the right knee. Austin also provides a notation system for the voice. Notation marks are placed at the beginning of a passage and then throughout the text whenever the speaker is to change the tone or rapidity of his or her vocal delivery.

=== Illustrations ===
The text of Chironomia is accompanied by 12 engraved plates depicting various positions of the feet, arms and body. Austin credits George Chinnery as the original artist but claims that he could not afford to pay Chinnery to complete the engravings. An anonymous young man was employed to alter and complete the plates.

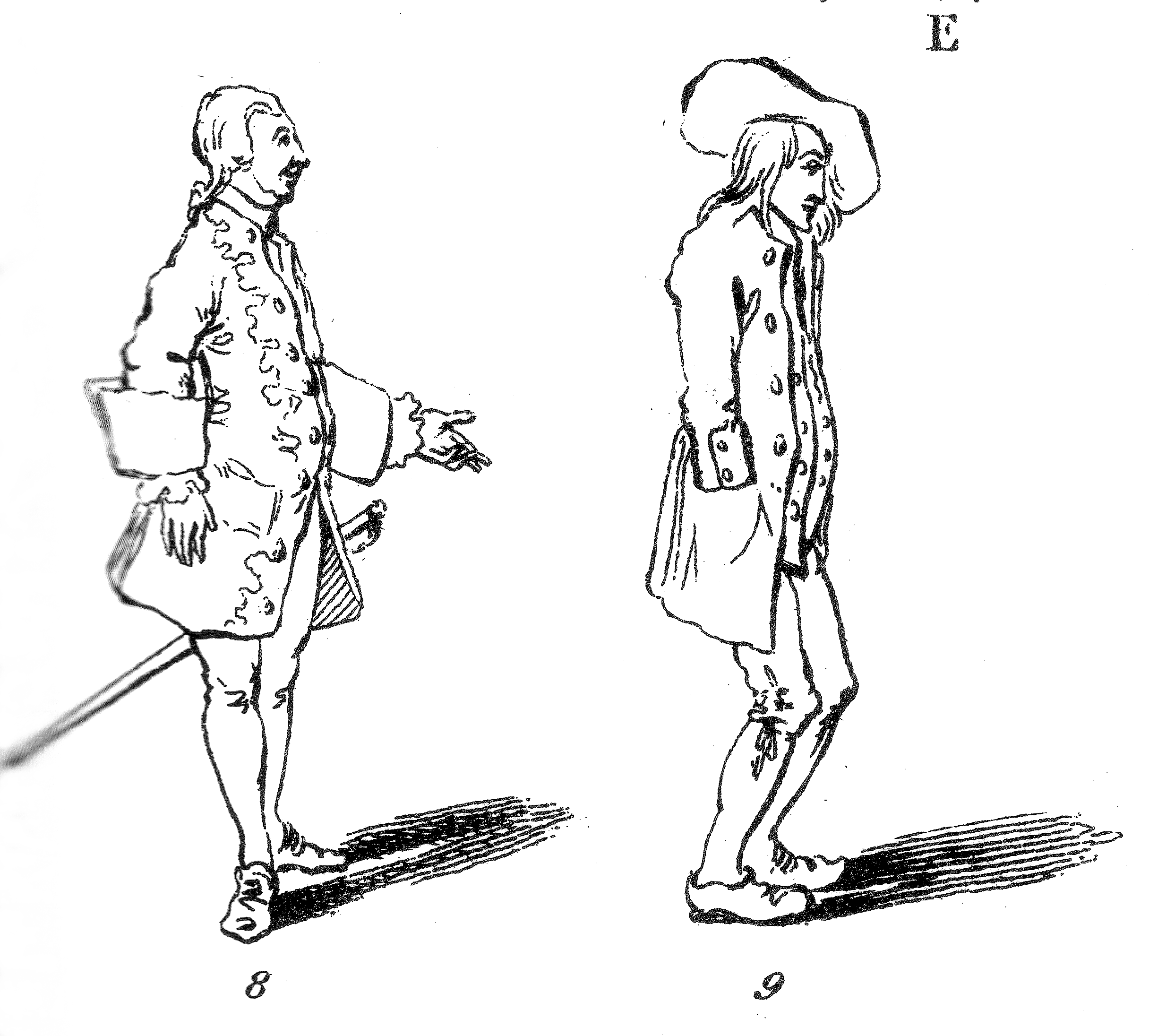
"The position of the orator is equally removed from the awkwardness of the rustic with toes turned in and knees bent, and from the affectation of the dancing-master, constrained and prepared for springing agility and for conceited display" (Chironomia Plate 1, Figures 8, 9)

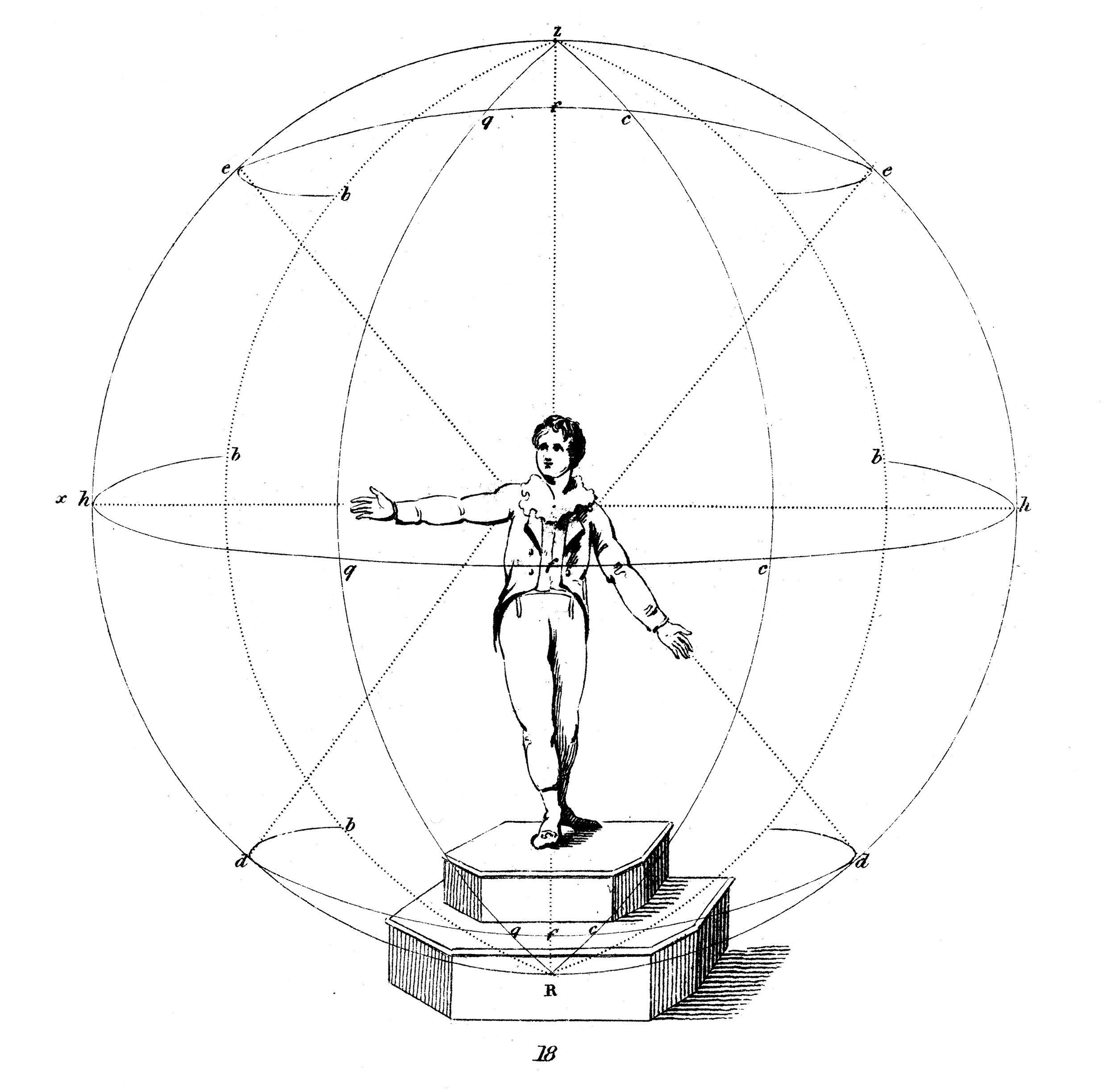
"The human figure being supposed to be so placed within this sphere, that the centre of the breast shall coincide with its centre, and that the diameter of the horizontal circle perpendicular to a radius drawn to the projecting point, shall pass through the shoulders, the positions and motions of the arms are referred to and determined by these circles and their intersections" (Chironomia Plate 2, Figure 18)

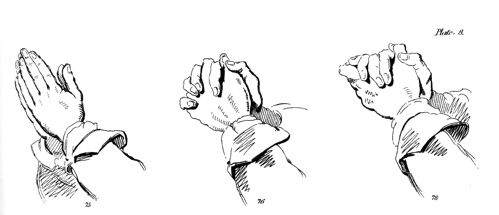
Austin's applied, clasped, and folded hand positions. (Chironomia Plate 8, Figures 75, 76, and 78)

=== Influence and criticism ===
Robb and Thonssen (1966) write that "until the teaching of Delsarte ... Austin was the authority on teaching gesture." With the publication of Chironomia, Austin's influence extended beyond his own school to classrooms throughout Britain and America. By the end of the 19th century, however, Chironomia had fallen from favour. Austin's method was considered too mechanical for modern tastes. G. P. Mohrmann (1968) claims the misperception of Chironomia as rigidly prescriptive is due to a lack of critical analysis of Austin's method. Spoel (1998) describes Chironomia as "a unique socially and historically situated representation of bodily discipline." Chironomia remains of interest to scholars not only for its insight into late-18th and early-19th century rhetorical practices but also for its collection of classical writings on delivery.
