= Writing process =

Process in which words and phrases are formed to produce a text

A writing process is a set of mental and physical steps that someone takes to create any type of text. Almost always, these activities require inscription equipment, either digital or physical: chisels, pencils, brushes, chalk, dyes, keyboards, touchscreens, or pens, with each of these tools having unique affordances that influence writers' workflows. Writing processes are very individualized and task-specific, frequently involving activities such as talking, drawing, reading, and browsing. Additionally, pre-writing strategies may involve processes that are not usually associated with writing, such as clustering; free writing; and asking who, what, when, where, why, and how questions.

== Historical and contemporary perspectives ==
In 1972, Donald M. Murray published a brief manifesto titled "Teach Writing as a Process Not Product", in which he argued that English teachers' conventional training in literary criticism caused them to hold students' work to unhelpful standards of highly polished "finished writing". Teachers, he explained, ought to focus less on correcting students' written products and focus more on involving students in "discovery through language", which Murray believed for "most writers most of the time" involved a process: i.e., stages of "pre-writing, writing and rewriting". Though Murray was not alone in advocating process-based instruction, this manifesto is regarded as a landmark vocalization of the differences between process and product orientations in the teaching of writing. Donald Murray mentioned that writing is to be considered as a process, not a product. In other words, he viewed getting the writers to work their way in order to discover new things rather than reach an end. He viewed writing as a journey of revision and development by which one discovers insights and develops thinking. Within a decade, Maxine Hairston was to observe that the teaching of writing had undergone a transformation in moving from a focus on written products to writing processes.

These categories were theorized more fully in subsequent scholarship. For example, pre-writing was defined by Project English experimental researcher D. Gordon Rohman as the "sort of 'thinking' [that] precedes writing" and the "activity of mind which brings forth and develops ideas, plans, designs". According to Rohman, writing begins "at the point where the 'writing idea' is ready for the words and the page". Student testimony of Rohman's research being effective can be seen here; "I was brought to an awareness of the world about me that I had just taken for granted. I really began to 'see.'" Even today, much "process-based" teaching has continued to broadly conceptualize writing processes along these three phases. Some have linked this three-stage process to the five canons of rhetoric: pre-writing to invention and arrangement, writing to style, revising to delivery and sometimes memory.

While contemporary research on writing processes still accepts that some kind of process is necessarily involved in producing any written text, it now collectively endorses "the fundamental idea that no codifiable or generalizable writing process exists or could exist". In this view, "writing processes are historically dynamic – not psychic states, cognitive routines, or neutral social relationships". In terms of "pre-writing" for instance, writing processes often begin long before any visible documentable work or easily categorizable steps are observable. From the contemporary perspective of composition studies, it is thus inaccurate to assume that any authentic writing process (i.e., one not contrived as part of a school assignment or laboratory setting) necessarily involves a linear sequence of "stages". Rather different kinds of activities emerge as overlapping parts of a complex whole or parts of a repeating process that can be repeated multiple times throughout anyone's process of composing a particular document. For example, writers routinely discover that editorial changes trigger brainstorming and a change of purpose; that drafting is temporarily interrupted to correct a misspelling; or that the boundary between pre-writing and drafting is less than obvious.

== Approaches to process ==
The writing process has been described by composition scholars in a variety of ways with attention to "developmental, expressive, and social" elements.

=== Cognitive process theory of writing (Flower–Hayes model) ===
==== Overview of cognitive model ====
Linda Flower (a composition theorist known in the field of cognitive rhetoric) and John R. Hayes extended Bitzer's rhetorical situation and developed a set of heuristics that framed the writing process as a series of rhetorical problems to be solved. The heuristics focus on the generation and the structuring of ideas. Writers should choose goals with built-in guidelines that lead their content into certain directions. While generating ideas, four viable techniques come to play. These are: to write ideas without editing or filtering, to play out scenarios discussing the topic, to generate analogies, and to rest on ideas. When a writer is looking to push their ideas they should try to find cue words to the complex ideas together, to teach the ideas to another person, to tree ideas into classifications of organization, and to read their own writing as if they'd never seen it before. The last tool is to write for a specific audience by finding common ground with them.

Flower and Hayes further developed the cognitive model in "The Cognition of Discovery" by observing writers in order to learn how they generate meaning. They outlined the rhetorical problem as a list of what a writer may address or consider. In doing so, they created a model for the rhetorical problem that can be split up into two main categories: The rhetorical situation and the writer's own goals. The rhetorical situation is what motivates a writer to create ideas. The writer's own goals are instrumental to how ideas are formed. The rhetorical situation is further split into the purpose of the writing, and who will be reading it. The writer's own goals are split into how the reader is affected, the persona the writer uses, the meaning the writer can create, and implementation of writing conventions.

Relying too heavily on one singular model can be restrictive. Some researchers say the writing process approach is varied based on the amount of structure they have. When there are too many rules and planning, it can be counterproductive. Even though planning is necessary, sticking to it so strictly can lead to writer’s block. There is also the concept of generalization. This approach shows that the writing process is most effective when students can take a skill from one assignment to another with different concepts. In this theory, the process isn’t just about finishing the paper. It’s about using these building block skills for future tasks.

They came to four results from their study, which suggests that good writers envelop the four following characteristics when solving their rhetorical problems:

1. Good writers respond to all of the rhetorical problems.
2. Good writers build their problem representation by creating a particularly rich network of goals for affecting a reader; and
3. Good writers represent the problem not only in more breadth but in more depth.
4. Good writers revise and seek feedback to improve their writing.

Flower and Hayes suggest that composition instructors need to consider showing students how "to explore and define their own problems, even within the constraints of an assignment". They believe that "writers discover what they want to do by insistently, energetically exploring the entire problem before them and building for themselves a unique image of the problem they want to solve."

=== Historical approaches to composition and process ===
A historical response to process is concerned primarily with the manner in which writing has been shaped and governed by historical and social forces. These forces are dynamic and contextual, and therefore render any static iteration of process unlikely.

Notable scholars that have conducted this type of inquiry include media theorists such as Marshall McLuhan, Walter Ong, Gregory Ulmer, and Cynthia Selfe. Much of McLuhan's work, for example, centered around the impact of written language on oral cultures, degrees to which various media are accessible and interactive, and the ways in which electronic media determine communication patterns. His evaluation of technology as a shaper of human societies and psyches indicates a strong connection between historical forces and literacy practices.

==== Criticism of cognitive model ====
Patricia Bizzell (a professor with a Ph.D in English and former President of Rhetoric Society of America) argues that even though educators may have an understanding of "how" the writing process occurs, educators should not assume that this knowledge can answer the question "about 'why' the writer makes certain choices in certain situations", since writing is always situated within a discourse community. She discusses how the Flower and Hayes model relies on what is called the process of "translating ideas into visible language". This process occurs when students "treat written English as a set of containers into which we pour meaning". Bizzell contends that this process "remains the emptiest box" in the cognitive process model, since it de-contextualizes the original context of the written text, negating the original. She argues, "Writing does not so much contribute to thinking as provide an occasion for thinking."

==== Traditional Models of Writing ====
Historically, the writing process has been based on a strategic model that includes prewriting, drafting, revising, and editing. This structure presents writing as a strict linear process that is designed to guide new writers through composition. This model simplifies how writing actually occurs. Writers move through stages by revising and adjusting their ideas throughout the writing process rather than following a fixed sequenced format.

=== Social model of writing process ===
"The aim of collaborative learning helps students to find more control in their learning situation.

The social model of writing relies on the relationship between the writers and readers for the purpose of creating meaning. "Writers seldom write exactly what they mean and readers seldom interpret a writer's words exactly as the writer intended."

Even grammar has a social turn in writing: "It may be that to fully account for the contempt that some errors of usage arouse, we will have to understand better than we do the relationship between language, order, and those deep psychic forces that perceived linguistic violations seem to arouse in otherwise amiable people". So one cannot simply say a thing is right or wrong. There is a difference of degrees attributed to social forces.

==== Writing as a Social Activity ====
Writing is influenced by social environments, interactions with others, academic expectations and pressure. Writing processes are shaped by different types of regulations which includes self-regulation, co-regulation and shared regulation.

-Self regulation: writers independently plan, monitor and adjust their writing strategies

-Co-regulation: writers receive guidance and feedback from instructors or peers

-Shared regulation: Writing is collaboratively shaped within groups or researchers

These types of regulation demonstrate how writing is not just an individual cognitive activity, but a socially practice influenced by academic communities and feedback systems.

=== Expressivist process theory of writing ===
According to the expressivist theory, the process of writing is centered on the writer's transformation. This involves the writer changing in the sense that voice and identity are established and the writer has a sense of his or her self. In expressivist pedagogy, writing is a process used to create meaning. An author’s sense of self is emphasized for bringing social change. This theory became popular in the late 1960s and early 1970s.

Several scholars have noted that the expressivist process is incredibly valuable when it comes to writer’s forming their own identities within writing, Michele Zugnoni and Anne Harrington in particular. Zugnoni discusses the ways in which including self-reflection and self-expression within writing is incredibly helpful in allowing first-generation students to build a sense of individuality and purpose. Zugnoni had female, first-generation students use self-reflection in writing, allowing for this group of students to create a sense of individuality from writing freely. In the book “Writing With Elbow,” Herrington’s chapter, titled “Gone Fishin’: Rendering and the Uses of Personal Experience in Writing,” states that the exclusion of personal experience in an academic writing assignment disregards the value of a writer’s experiences.

Expressivist process theory and academic writing complement one another, that academic inquiry focuses on discovery wherein expressivism is the discovery and analysis of your personal experiences. It is discussed that the act of writing about one’s personal experience not only helps to make sense of those experiences but allows them to build their voice, Bruce Ballenger stating his own students had told him that writing had been put into a new light when allowed to express their personal experiences.

According to Richard Fulkerson's article "Four Philosophies of Composition", the focus of expressivism is for writers to have "... an interesting, credible, honest, and personal voice". Moreover, proponents of the expressivist process view this theory as a way for students to become fulfilled and healthy both emotionally and mentally. Those who teach this process often focus on journaling and other classroom activities to focus on student self-discovery and at times, low-stakes writing. Prominent figures in the field include John Dixon, Ken Macrorie, Lou Kelly, Donald C. Stewart and Peter Elbow.

Expressivist theory in writing goes against the academic side of writing by valuing individualism over structure. Personal voice and creative exploration is seen as a better way for student writers to write in academic settings.

Writers often use freewriting as a form of expressivism. Freewriting is seen as a way to allow creativity in one's writing, allowing the writer to include personal and academic ideas into each piece. Expressivism allows people to let their inner thoughts roam free which is a precursor to brainstorming and organizing thoughts. Many writers also use a tool called voice. It is used to give character to writing. It induces personal experience and emotion and introduces personality.

Expressivist theorists like Peter Elbow argue that freewriting is not just a tactic to increase the speed of drafting, but a tool for thought discovery. This theory allows writers to uncover thoughts because all restrictions are gone. Other researches emphasize the expressivist mode in a social sense.

Expressivism in the pedagogical world allows for themes of Being (self-concept), Belonging (community), and Becoming (growth). This leads to something called the creative identity which is viewed as something that continues to change over time. Memoirs can aid in the process of identity exploration and self reflection. By applying self reflection in writing, writers are able to understand the concept of critical expressivism which is an ideology explored by Scott Wagar. Critical Expressivism highlights how using empathy and connection promotes connecting personal experiences with others’ concerns. Wagar emphasizes that this level of self expression in writing can help build community and individual growth.

=== Writing as a Nonlinear Process ===
Contemporary research challenges the ideas of writing into a fixed sequences of steps. Instead writing is recursive, writers repeatedly change earlier steps such as ideas generating, revision and reconstructing. Popular portrayals of writing suggest a clean and controlled process while students experience messy and uncertain that is caused by trial and error. Failure, revision and starting over are all common components of writing, there are no right or wrongs when writing. This perspective views writing as a process of experimentation rather than completing predefined steps that follow a strict structure.

=== Scaffolding and Draft Development ===
Instruction approaches to writing emphasizes scaffolding to support student development. Knisely (2023) describes a structured approach where students start with a "zero draft" or a free-writing stage towards a completed essay. The zero draft allows students to generate ideas without concern for any type of structure or correctness, the ideas are developed through certain guided steps:

- Developing a thesis
- Identifying supporting evidence
- Expanding analysis and interpretation
- Organizing key ideas
- Forming conclusions

This scaffolding process overall helps students transition from informal writing to formal academic composition by making writing stages more manageable.

=== Autistic autobiographies ===
As appealing as document sharing may be for students with autism in particular, being able to contextualize one's life story in the context of their disability may prove the most powerful expression of the overall writing process. Rose illustrates that creating narrative identity in a conventional sense is quite difficult for autistic students because of their challenges with interpersonal communication. The narratives of autistic students can sometimes be troubling to non-autistic peers with whom they share their work, as Rose notes in quoting autistic autobiographer Dawn Price-Hughes: "Sometimes reaching out and communicating isn't easy–it can bring sadness and regret. Some of my family and friends, after reading the manuscript for this book, were deeply saddened to learn how I experienced my world."

Rose points to the well-known work of Temple Grandin and Donna Williams as examples of autistic autobiographies and analogizes toward the usefulness of women's autobiographies championed by Susan Stanford Friedman to show women's inter-connectivity, suggesting the same can be learned through autistic autobiographies. She writes that such works can minimize the "pathologization (the treatment of a health or behaviour condition as if it were a medical condition) of difference" which can easily occur between autistic students. Also, peers without autism can be broken down by such autobiographies. As Rose directly says, "I argue here that awareness of the relationality of autistic life writing, and the recognition of its corollary status as testimonio and attention to the material relations of the production of these texts is particularly useful in assessing their social significance."

=== Individual and Situational Variation in Writing ===
Writing processes vary depending on the writers, the context and the prompt/task. Dengscherz (2022) argues that writing should be understood as a situational activity that is shaped by changing conditions rather than a process all together.

This model emphasizes that writers continue to adapt strategies based on:

- Task requirements
- Academic expectations
- Personal challenges or strengths
- Language/multilingual contexts

The PROSIMS model is presented by Dengscherz that distinguishes between to highlight writing as adaptive and context

- Heuristic writing: exploration and idea development
- Rhetorical writing: communicating effectively to an audience

Research has identified differences in the writing strategies used by undergraduate students. Kim (2020) examined 260 Korean college students and identified four writing profiles: revision-based, plan-based, search-based, and correction-based. The study found that revision-based writers produced higher-quality texts than the other groups. Similarly, Limpo and Alves (2018) studied the effects of planning strategies on writing and found that planning strategies affected aspects of student's writing processes and final texts. These findings suggest that writing strategies can vary among individuals and may influence the quality and development of written work.

=== Writing Mindset and Performance ===
Research on writing mindset suggests that students' beliefs about writing ability influence their performance and development. Miller explains how it is more likely that students that get tutored end up having a growth mindset instead of a fixed mindset.

Students mindsets affect their performances in different areas whether its attitudes, learning strategies or success, especially when countering obstacles and challenges.

== Editing ==
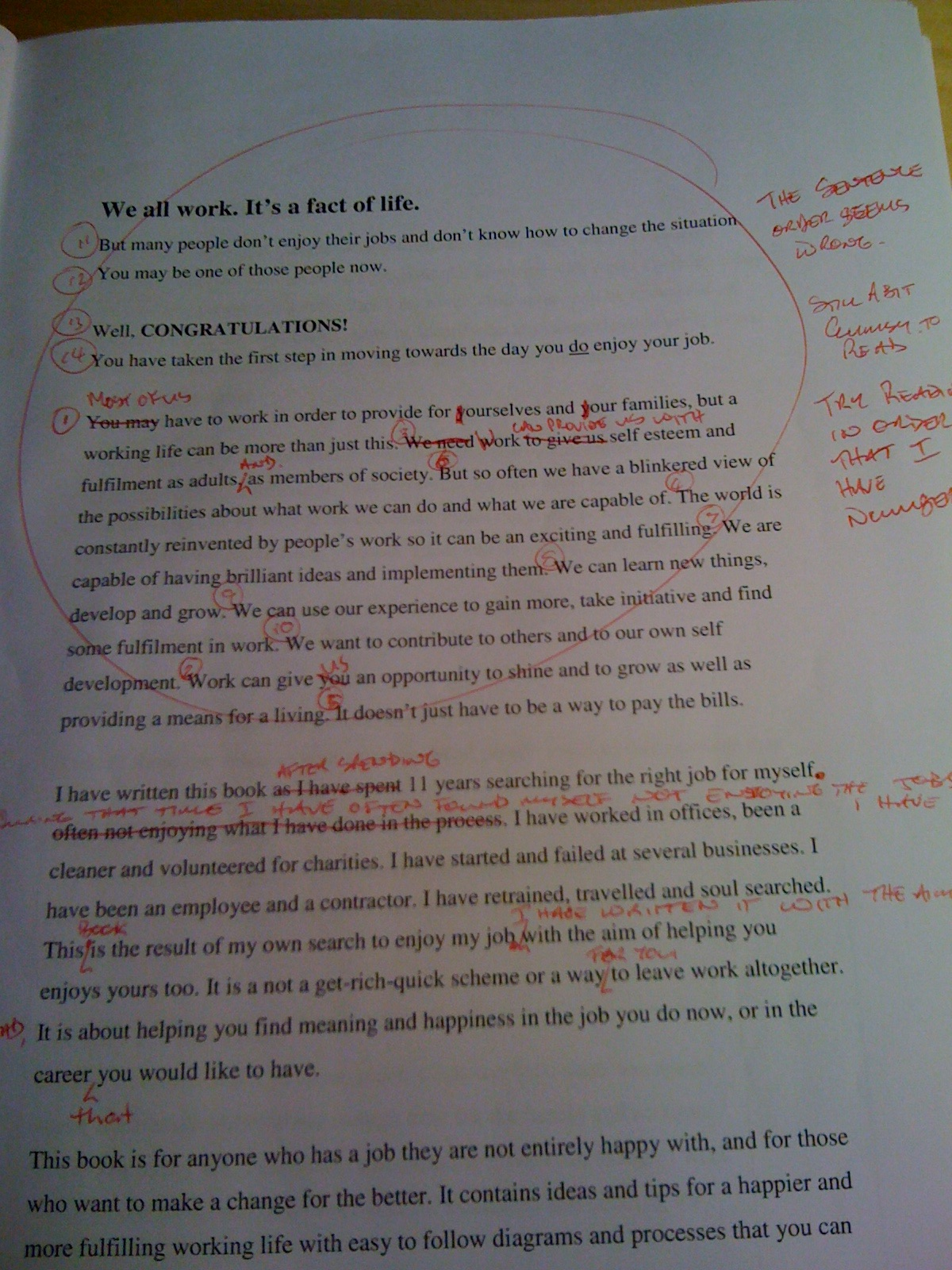
Manual editing of a printed document by directly writing annotations and remarks on paper

Editing operates on several levels. The lowest level, often called line editing, is the stage in the writing process where the writer makes changes in the text to correct errors—such as spelling, subject/verb agreement, verb tense consistency, point of view consistency, mechanical errors, word choice, and word usage (there, their or they're)—and fine-tune his or her style. Having revised the draft for content, the writer's task is now to make changes that will improve the communication with the reader. Depending on the genre, the writer may choose to adhere to the conventions of Standard English. These conventions are still being developed and the rulings on controversial issues may vary depending on the source. For example, Strunk and White's Elements of Style, first published in 1918, is considered by some to be an authority on stylistic conventions but has been derided by linguist Geoffrey K. Pullum as "stupid". An electronic resource is the Purdue Online Writing Lab (OWL), where writers may search a specific issue to find an explanation of grammatical and mechanical conventions.

== See also ==
- Argument mapping
- Composition (language)
- Style guide
- Writer's block
- Writing style
