= Composing =

Composing may refer to:

- Composition (language), in literature and rhetoric, producing a work in spoken tradition and written discourse, to include visuals and digital space
  - Visual rhetoric and composition, visual literacy as ones' ability to read an image and communicate using images
  - eRhetoric, online communication, composing which understands the relationship between medium and rhetorical situation
  - Writing process, producing a written work
- Dance composition, the practice and teaching of choreography and the navigation or connection of choreographic structures
- Musical composition, the process of creating a new piece of music
- Composition (visual arts), the plan, placement or arrangement of the elements of art in a work
