= European Association for Technical Communication =

The European Association for Technical Communication (tekom Europe e.V.) is the largest professional association for technical communication worldwide. The association connects more than 8,500 professionals like technical communicators, technical writers, and others from related fields. The working language is English.

tekom Europe was founded in November 2013 in Wiesbaden, Germany, by representatives of tekom Deutschland, of the former tekom country groups and of the Italian association COM&TEC. and registered as a lobby organization in the European Transparency Register.

The main task of the association is to organize creators of user information in their countries and represent their interests on European level. tekom Europe supports important EU policies such as improving the training of young people, the employability and mobility of workers as well as the competitiveness of the European economy in general. One of the European initiatives which tekom Europe is involved in is ESCO (European Skills/Competences, qualifications and Occupations).

== Member countries ==
The association currently consists of members from ten countries:

- Austria (tekom Österreich)
- Belgium (tekom Belgium)
- Bulgaria (tekom България)
- Denmark (tekom Danmark)
- France (tekom France)
- Germany (tekom Deutschland, corporate member)
- Hungary (tekom Magyarország)
- Israel (tekom Israel)
- Italy (COM&TEC Italia, corporate member)
- Netherlands (tekom Netherlands)
- Poland (tekom Polska)
- Romania (tekom Romania)
- Sweden (tekom Sweden)
- Turkey (tekom Türkiye)
- Schweiz (Tecom Schweiz, corporate member)

== Goals ==
tekom Europe's mission is to:

- promote and further develop technical communication in Europe
- set European standards for the quality of technical communication
- increase the importance given to technical communication throughout Europe, both in commerce and among the general public
- strengthen and harmonize the occupational profile of the technical writer
- promote cooperation among universities and educational institutions at a European level
- participate in developing international standards for user manuals and operating instructions

== Activities ==
- Roadshows
- Academic Colloquia
- Working Groups

== Administrative Council ==
- Chairperson: Tiziana Sicilia
- Deputy Chairperson: Magali Baumgartner
- Secretary: Josef Kubovsky
- Treasurer: Gary Manders
