= Thomas Dermody =

Irish poet

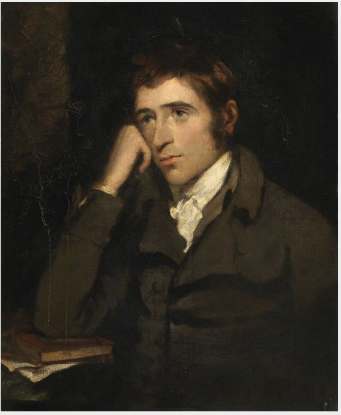

Thomas Dermody (1775–1802) was an Irish poet. He wrote under pseudonyms including Mauritius Moonshine, and Marmaduke Myrtle.

== Life ==
Dermody was born in Ennis. He was scholarly but lived hard, and made little of his life. He spent some time as a soldier. He had the genius of a poet, and wrote fairly good poetry;but his genius was not enough. He lived for 27 years, half his life a promising boy and half a ne'er-do-well. His promise brought him, generous patrons, in his early days in Ireland, but he scorned the hand that fed him, denied the friends who would have nursed his genius, and ran away to England to keep bad company. Friend after friend he gained and lost. Patron after patron he abused. They clothed and cleaned him and made him presentable, but he would drink himself to nakedness and rags and behave like a brute. Such from day to day and year to year was his life, and in the end he drank himself to death and perished in a miserable cottage near Lewisham. He was filled with conceit and a slave to his desires, but the lines that are fading away on the stone above his grave show that he was a poet. He is buried in the churchyard of St. Mary's church Lewisham.

Among his patrons were Dr. Houlton, of Trinity College, the actor Mr. Owenson, the schoolmaster Rev. Gilbert Austin (who in 1789 published a volume of Dermody’s poems at his own expense), a Mr. Atkinson and finally the Dowager Countess of Moira.

== Works ==
Dermody published two books of poems, which after his death were collected as The Harp of Erin. Some 56 of his sonnets being published in various works, from his first 1789 collection Poems to those published in 1792, with a few posthumously published verses in the biography by James Grant Raymond. Samuel Taylor Coleridge took an interest in some of his verse which had been included in the literary magazine The Anthologia Hibernica.
