= Gesticulation in Italian =

Form of nonverbal communication

Hand gestures are used in regions of Italy and in the Italian language as a form of nonverbal communication and expression. The gestures within the Italian lexicon are dominated by movements of the hands and fingers, but may also include movements of facial features such as eyebrows, the mouth and the cheeks.

Theories persist as to the exact origin of hand gestures as a method of communication in Italy, though they likely emerged through necessity as a universal, non-verbal method of communicating across different Italian local languages and dialects. Despite the majority of today's Italian population speaking Italian, hand gestures have persisted as a method of expression to accompany verbal speech in many regions of Italy.

Around 251 specific hand gestures have been identified.

== History ==
The precise origin of hand gestures as a popular component of Italian communication is still contested. De Jorio interprets the endurance of hand gestures in Southern Italy in particular as a cultural legacy of the Romans, who used the art of chironomia in everyday communication and in oratory. Popular belief says that they developed during a period of occupation in which seven main groups are believed to have taken root in Italy: the Germanic tribes (Vandals, Ostrogoths and Lombards), Moors, Normans, French, Spaniards, and Austrians. Given that there was no common language, rudimentary sign language may have developed, forming the basis of modern-day hand gestures.

The development of hand gestures is closely connected with a communicative phenomenon, and as a non-verbal communication system, could not have been formed within a short period. Amid early urbanization in Italy, the increasing demand for communication stimulated the wide use of hand gestures in Italy, as did colonization and the resulting cultural fusion and language barrier. Ancient Greek colonization of the Mediterranean coast, including southern Italy, can be traced back via research to the early eighth century BC. After the fall of the Western Roman Empire, local languages did not assume a dominant position over one another due to the arrival of new immigrants and colonizers from other regions. Data indicates seven main groups: the Carolingians, the Visigoths, the Normans, the Saracens, the Germanic tribes, the French, and the Austrians. Additionally, an extant funeral stone from the 5th century BC (currently in the Pergamon Museum in Berlin) depicts two soldiers shaking hands. This is believed to be proof of gestures in Ancient Greek culture, which passed to and affected Italian non-verbal communication through generations even more than spoken language. To the 21st century, around 250 hand gestures Italians use in everyday conversation have been identified.

The irreplaceable role of gestures in medieval and Renaissance societies is referred to as "une civilisation du geste" ("a civilisation of gesture") by Jacques Le Goff. As the Renaissance emphasized the restoration of human nature in the classical era with the aim of breaking the shackles of religion, people became more willing to express themselves and attract others' attention. Hand gestures allowed those using them to express themselves to a more satisfactory degree, making the Renaissance a vital era for the development of Italian hand gestures.

Hand gestures were particularly conspicuous in Italy during the early modern period. This may be due to the emergence of large, highly populated city-states throughout Italy, such as Florence and Naples, in which people were compelled to make themselves more understood. The more frequent usage of hand gestures by individuals living in, or raised in, Italian cities is still observable in a contemporary context.

=== Gesture frontier ===
A "gesture frontier" exists in Italy which separates the gestures used commonly in Southern Italy from those used in Northern Italy. This frontier is evident in the differing meaning of the 'chin flick' gesture. In Northern Italy, this gesture generally means 'get lost', whereas in Southern Italy it simply means 'no'. According to Morris, this is due to the ancient Greek colonisation of Southern Italy, as Greeks also use the 'chin flick' gesture to mean 'no'. A study conducted in central Italy proved this gesture frontier to be true; despite the mobility of the Italian population and the existence of nationwide media, the majority of the northern Roman population used the 'chin flick' with the Northern meaning, and the southern Neapolitan population used the Southern meaning.

This separation is evident between Northern and Southern Europe as well as within Italy; for instance, speakers of English and Dutch generally use gesticulations considerably less in their speech than Italians and Greeks. The heavy use of gestures in communication has historically been considered indicative of a lack of civilisation in Southern European cultures by Northern Europeans.

== Role of gestures in communication ==
The continuation of hand gestures as a part of the Italian lexicon can be best understood as a form of cultural coding, as Italian children unconsciously imitate their parents and peers' behaviours, causing them to develop gesticulating during conversation as an involuntary habit.

The use of hand gestures has always served a dual purpose in Italian culture; a substantive purpose which contributes expression to verbal communication and indicates emotion, and a pragmatic purpose which can serve as a substitute to verbal communication.

In a contemporary context, hand gestures are primarily used amongst Italians as a form of expression to accompany conversation rather than a substitute for verbal communication. The prevalence of hand gestures in communication in large Italian cities is thought to be due to competition, as individuals unconsciously wish to be more visible and take up more space in a busy urban setting by adding physical elements to their communication.

=== Communication versus information ===
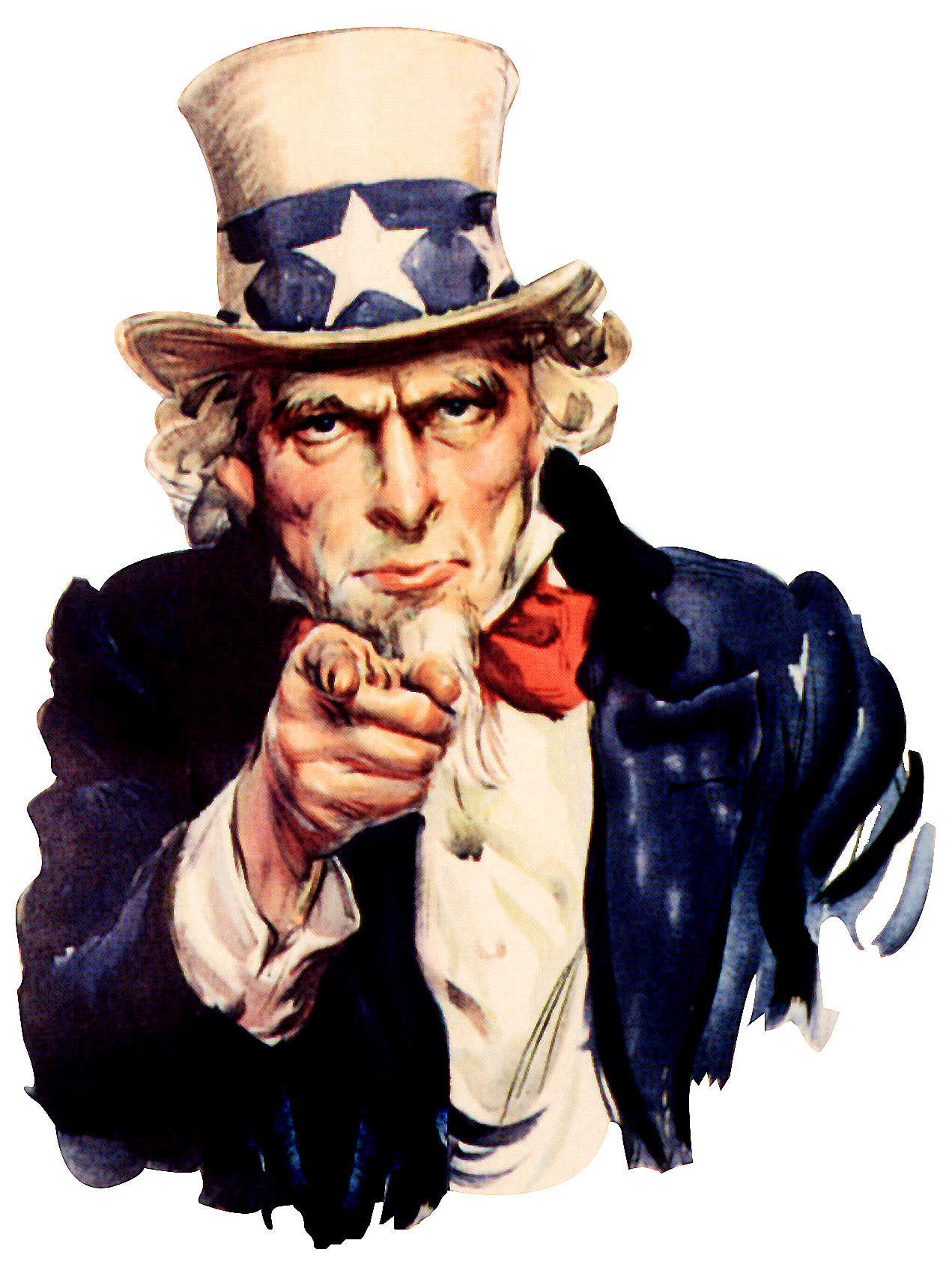
A pointing Uncle Sam is an example of strong non-verbal communication; this gesture is seen as impolite in many countries

==== Communication ====
Communicative gestures could also be referred to as "active" gestures, since they are performed on purpose by individuals. For example, a speaker who is enthusiastic to deliver important information to their audience might emphasize hand gestures rather than speech. An example is J.M. Flagg's poster of Uncle Sam, who points his index finger directly towards the viewer in what is seen as a strong expression.

==== Information ====
Informative or "passive" gestures refer to hand movements that are not necessary or meaningful to the conversation, such as scratching, adjusting one's clothing, and tapping. Since this part of gesture does not focus on communication, it usually does not involve extra verbal communication.

== Classification of gestures ==
There are two main ways to classify Italian hand gestures. The first way is to distinguish them via their use cases, such as during religious rites, at gladiatorial arenas, and in daily conversation. Another way is to differentiate communicative and informative hand gestures in the Italian language. These two types of gestures might occur automatically, whereas the informative-communicative dichotomy is used to explore the actual intent of use behind the conversation.

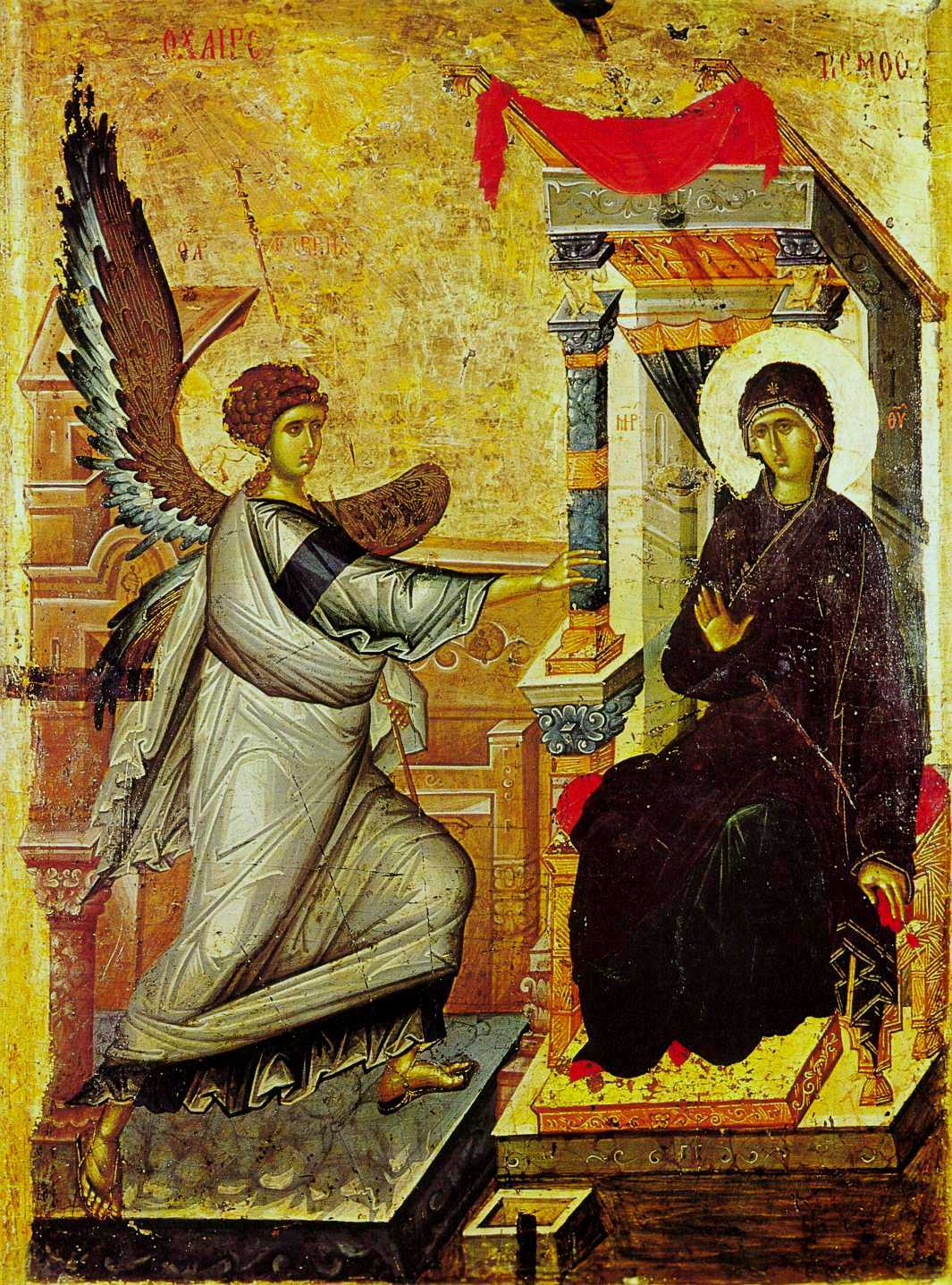
Icons of the Annunciation

=== Religious rites ===
In the oldest surviving images of the Annunciation, the Archangel Gabriel is generally found raising his hand before mentioning something important, a gesture widely adopted by Roman rhetoricians for the same purpose.

=== Gladiatorial arenas ===
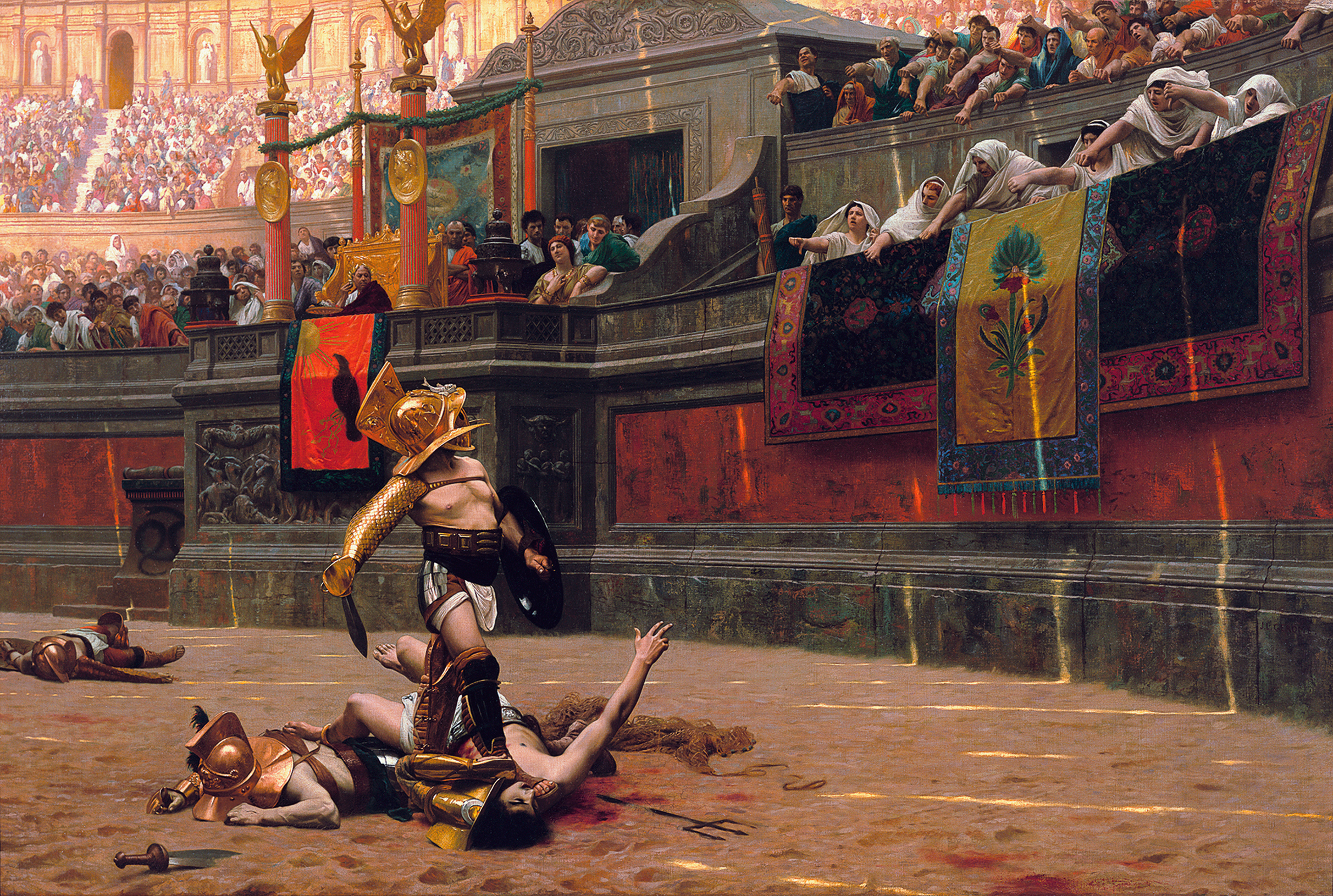
Pollice Verso (1872), which popularized the thumbs-down gesture. Oil on canvas, Phoenix Art Museum

More recent research suggests that the thumbs-up and thumbs-down gestures originated from Roman gladiatorial arenas, being used to decide the destiny of the loser of a fight. The loser would beg for mercy to the crowd, who would decide his fate by pointing their thumbs up or down. If the gladiator received more thumbs up than thumbs down, then he was to be spared. A majority of thumbs down, on the other hand, signified execution. However, there is still controversy amongst scholars about the exact meanings of thumbs-up and thumbs-down in ancient Rome.

=== Daily routines ===
The habit of talking with one's hands in Italy has been reported to address and reinforce the meanings of various expressions. In normal conversation, gesturing helps in delivering the meaning and receiving information, an example being up-down movement of the hand. When begging for help, an Italian may press their palms together as if praying. Due to differences in local context and cultural background, Italian hand gestures vary among regions.

== Basic gestures ==
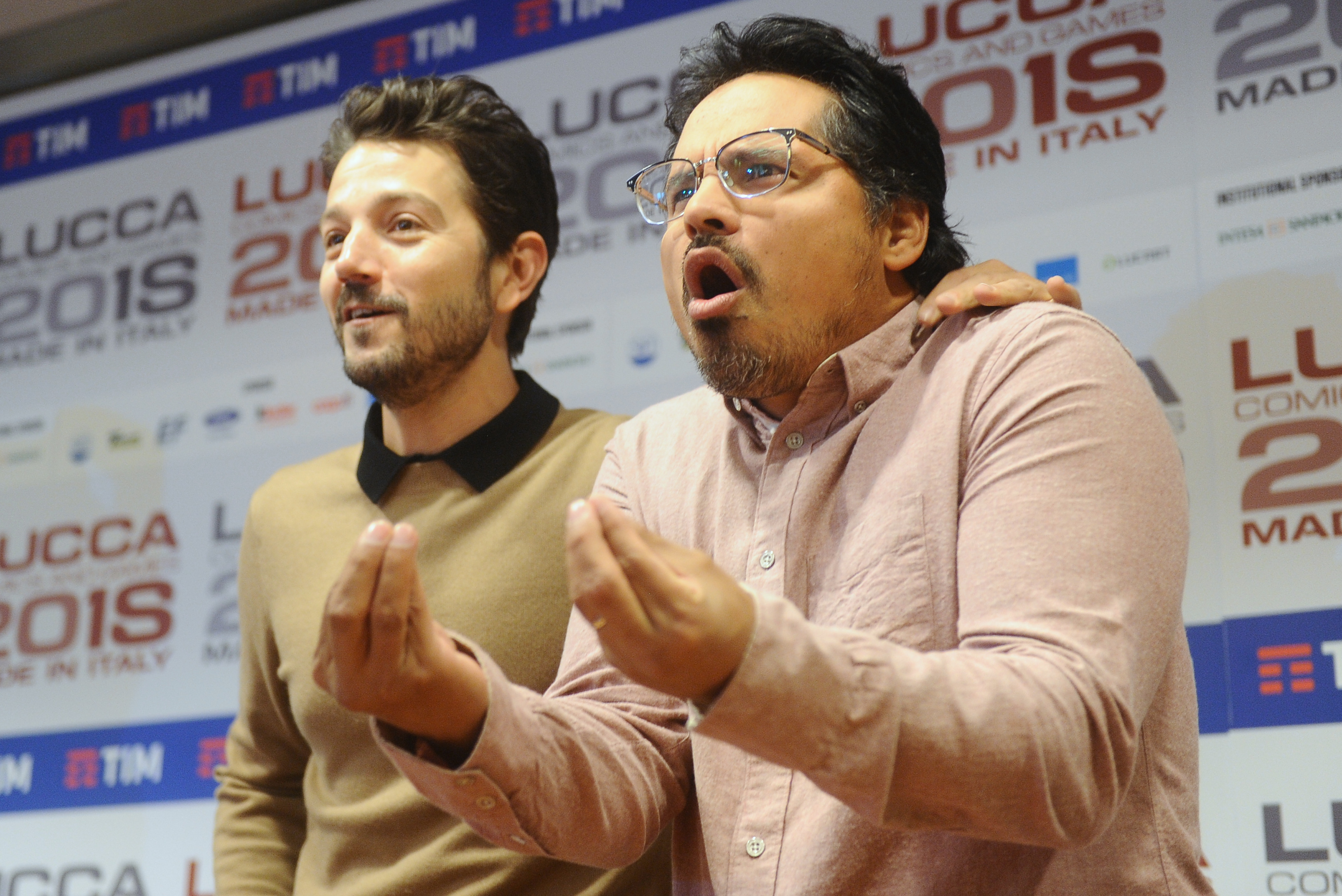
Michael Peña performing the "Che vuoi?" gesture at Lucca Comics & Games (2018)

The following section introduces some common and useful gestures used regularly in Italian conversation with words described.

- Pinched fingers – Also known as a finger purse or Che vuoi? (🤌). The fingertips of one hand are brought together, pointing upward. The hand itself is about a foot of distance from the body. The hand moves up and down at the wrist. Has various meanings, often "what do you want/what do you mean".
- Please do me a favor – The palms are put together as if in prayer (🙏) and pressed to the chest.
- Excellent – All ten fingers are bunched together and lifted to mouth level, before being brought to touch the lips.
- Perfect – Also known as an OK gesture (👌). The thumb and index finger form a circle, with the other three fingers extended away.
- Delicious – One index finger is placed on the cheek, or all fingertips on one hand are touched together and kissed while extending the hand away from the mouth.
- Think twice – One index finger is pointed to one side of the head.
- Beware – One index finger points to a bottom eyelid, with the eye staring.
- I swear – A cross is formed using both index fingers in front of the chest.
- See you later – One index finger draws a small circle in the air.
- Dramatic change – With the palm of one hand facing downwards, the hand is suddenly flipped so that the palm faces upwards.
- Let's go – With the palm facing inwards, flatten your fingers except thumb, after that shake hand in an up and down movements several times.
- Asking another person for a cigarette – The index and middle finger form a narrow V shape pointing upwards (as if holding a cigarette), as the hand is brought towards and away from the mouth.
- Chin flick – The head is flicked backwards while tutting. In Southern Italy and other countries in the Mediterranean, it means "no". In Northern Italy and other countries such as France, it means 'get lost'.
- Get lost – The arm is outstretched and the hand is flat. The hand moves up and down, similarly to a knifehand strike but at the wrist. Used either ironically or maliciously.
- Indication of disbelief – The balls of the hands and the fingertips are pressed together to form a teardrop shape, and the hands move up and down.
- L'ombrello ("the umbrella") – profane gesture more commonly known in the English-speaking world by its French name, the bras d'honneur. One arm is bent with the forearm facing upwards, and the other hand slaps the crook of the bent arm's elbow.
- I couldn't care less – The hand is cupped under the chin and flicked outwards repeatedly.

== Benefits ==
Gesticulation is often regarded as having a positive impact on expression for the speaker and understanding for the listener. Hand gestures often mirror and illustrate the speaker’s internal thoughts. Neuroimaging research shows that areas involved in language production, such as Broca’s area, are co-activated during gesture, which suggests neurological link between gesture and cognitive processes. Gestures also render communication more effective and support comprehension by embodying action and structuring ideas, which has many benefits, particularly in the context of education. Cognitive psychology research indicates that congruent gestures can deepen understanding by visually representing the sequence and causality of concepts and thus effectively acts as a "second language" that complements speech.

Longitudinal studies demonstrate that the number of distinct gesture meanings conveyed by toddlers at around 14 months of age significantly predicts vocabulary size at 42 to 54 months. For instance, one study found that gesture variety at 14 months explained an additional 32% of variance in vocabulary at age 3.5, even after accounting for early spoken words. Another study confirmed that more gesturing at 14 months was linked to increased school readiness and greater vocabulary at 54 months. Research studying a group of children aged from 18 to 42 months found that early gesture-speech combinations (e.g. pointing while naming an object) was a better predictor of sentence complexity, whereas gesture variety was a more accurate predictor of vocabulary growth. Pointing and other referential gestures (deictic gestures) appear as early as 8–10 months and consistently predict later language development, including the onset of first words and two-word combinations. In addition, research shows that gesture use is influenced by caregiver behaviour and family background. Children from higher socioeconomic households tend to gesture more, which correlates with larger vocabulary size; gesture use mediates about 40% of the disparity in vocabulary due to socioeconomic status.

Socially, people who gesture in conversation are often associated with enthusiasm and sociable personality. Gesturing plays an important role in public speaking, particularly in emphasising ideas and influencing the audience's perception of the speaker.

== See also ==
- Italian Sign Language – Sign language of Italy
- Sign of the horns
- Gesture
