= Chironomia =

Art of hand gesturing in speech

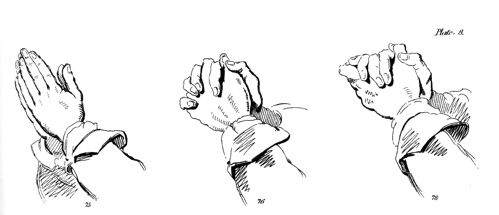
Hand gestures images. Austin, Gilbert. Chironomia, or a Treatise on Rhetorical Delivery. London: 1806. Ed. Mary Margaret Robb and Lester Thonssen. Carbondale, IL: Southern Illinois UP, 1966. Clasped, crossed, and folded hand positions. (Chironomia Plate 8, Figures 75, 76, 78)

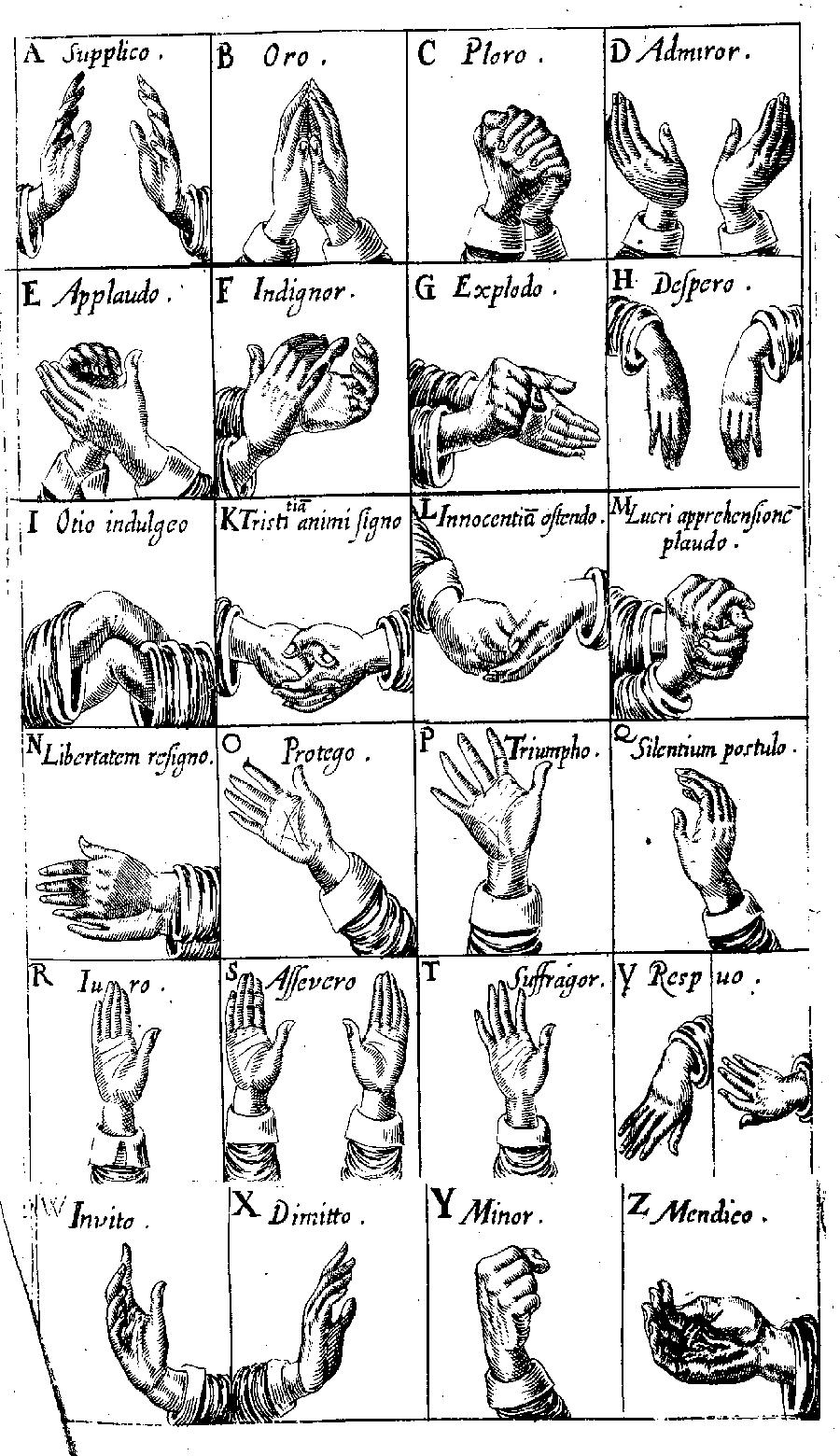
Chirologia, 1644

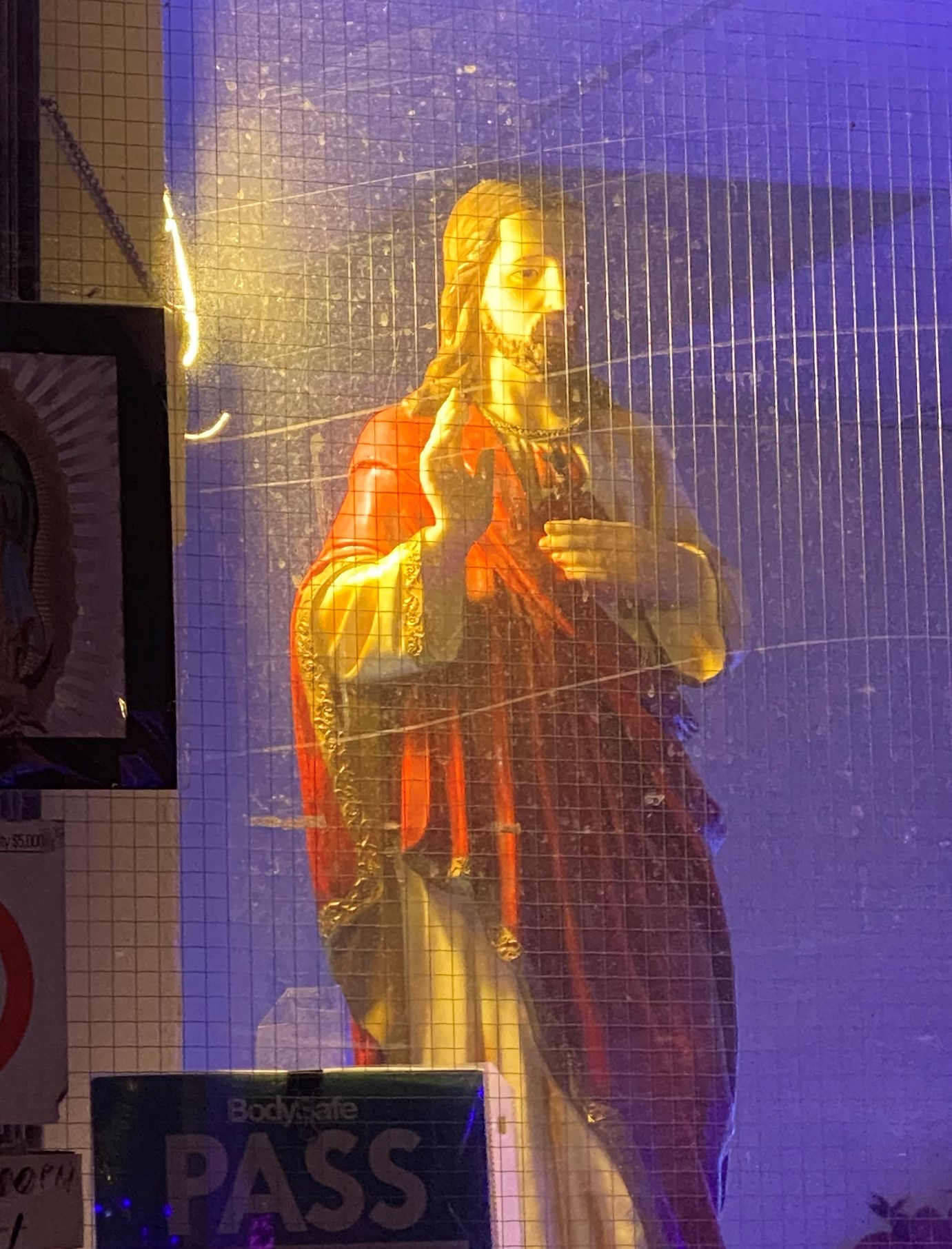
Representations of Jesus often employ various rhetorical gestures, as seen on this statue in a shop window in Little Portugal, Toronto.

Chironomia is the art of using gesticulations or hand gestures to detailed effect in traditional rhetoric or oratory. Effective use of the hands, with or without the use of the voice, is a practice of great antiquity, which was developed and systematized by the Greeks and the Romans. Various gestures had conventionalized meanings which were commonly understood, either within certain class or professional groups, or broadly among dramatic and oratorical audiences.

Gilbert Austin was a well-known author on chironomia. The article about him contains a summary of theories in chironomia.

== See also ==
- Gesticulation in Italian
- Mudra
