= Pronuntiatio =

Discipline of delivering speeches in Western classical rhetoric

Pronuntiatio was the discipline of delivering speeches in Western classical rhetoric. It is one of the five canons of classical rhetoric (the others being inventio, dispositio, elocutio, and memoria) that concern the crafting and delivery of speeches. In literature the equivalent of ancient pronuntiatio is the recitation of epics (Aris. Po. 26.2.).

As with memoria, the canon that dealt with the memorization of speeches, pronuntiatio was not extensively written about in Classical texts on rhetoric. Its importance declined even more, once the written word became the focus of rhetoric, although after the eighteenth century it again saw more interest in the works of men such as Gilbert Austin.

Rhetoricians laid down guidelines on the use of the voice and gestures (actio) in the delivery of oratory. There were instructions on the proper modulation of the voice (volume and pitch), as well as the phrasing, pace, and emphasis of speech. Also covered were the physical aspects of oration: stance, gestures, posture, and facial expressions. There was also the concept of exercitatio (or practice exercises) that enabled speakers to both memorize their speeches and practice their delivery.

This excerpt from Quintilian's Institutio oratoria provides an example of the types of advice provided by rhetoricians:

"The head, being the chief member of the body, has a corresponding importance in delivery, serving not merely to produce graceful effect, but to illustrate our meaning as well. To secure grace it is essential that the head should be carried naturally and erect. For a droop suggests humility, while if it be thrown back it seems to express arrogance, if inclined to one side it gives an impression of languor, while if it is held too stiffly and rigidly it appears to indicate a rude and savage temper." (Institutio oratoria, XI iii 68-69, translated by H. E. Butler, Loeb Classical Library, 1922)

While the content, structure, and style of oration were (and continue to be) the most important elements of oratory, effective delivery enhances its persuasive power, and poor delivery detracts greatly from its intended effect.

Delivery is based on the technology of the times. During Cicero's time, delivery was predominantly speaking. Written delivery developed because of the written language, and now delivery is both spoken and written. Technology has removed some of the distinctions between written and oral delivery.

Written discourse did not become important until reading became more common. Because the ancients did not use punctuation, their writing consisted of one long stream of words called scriptio continua. During the editing process, modern rhetors must go through three stages: correctness rule, formatting, and presentation. Writers face more problems than speakers because they must be conscious of spelling, punctuation, and grammar. Punctuation is useful in written discourse because it marks the end of a thought and allows the reader to pause and process the information. Visual rhetoric focuses on images and how words function as images. The delivery of ocular demonstration is the use of words to produce mental images in the audience. Textual presentation allows the writer to grab the reader's attention before actually reading the text based on the appearance of the text. The invention of word processors has allowed writers to enhance the appearance of their text and use effects to put emphasis on certain words or thoughts. Delivery refers not only to written or spoken language, but also to photographs, paintings, or movies.

== Other forms ==
- Elocution, modern form
- Shiksha, Hindu Vedic form
- Tajwid, Muslim form
