= Dispositio =

Canon of rhetoric

Dispositio is the system used for the organization of arguments in the context of Western classical rhetoric. The word is Latin, and can be translated as "organization" or "arrangement".

It is the second of five canons of classical rhetoric (the first being inventio, and the remaining being elocutio, memoria, and pronuntiatio) that concern the crafting and delivery of speeches and writing. Ancient writers applied this concept at two levels: the order of the main parts of speech as well as the order of the arguments within each part.

The first part of any rhetorical exercise is to discover the proper arguments to use, which was done by the formalized methods of inventio. The next problem is to select various arguments and organize them into an effective discourse. Aristotle recognized only two essential parts of speech, later Latin handbooks taught six. The scheme of six remained a standard part of rhetorical education.

== Aristotle ==
Aristotle defined two essential parts of a discourse: the statement of the case and the proof of the case. For example, in a legal argument, a prosecutor must first declare the charges against the defendant and provide the relevant facts; then he must present the evidence that proves guilt. Aristotle allowed that in practice most discourse also requires an introduction and a conclusion. Aristotle allowed in practice that most discourse also requires a introduction and a conclusion, so that a speech has at most four parts: introduction, statement, proof, conclusion.

He gave the conclusion four tasks: to make the audience well known toward the speaker and the unknown the opponent. Which causes the magnification or minimization of leading facts, arousing of the audience's emotions, as well as to refresh their memory.

== Latin rhetoric ==
The oldest complete Latin handbook of rhetoric is the anonymous Rhetorica ad Herennium, written in the 80s BC, which reflects Hellenistic Greek teachings. Later writers on rhetoric, such as Cicero and Quintilian, refined this organizational scheme, so that there were eventually six parts:

- The introduction, or exordium. In the exordium, the speaker prepares the audience to hear the rest of the speech by making them receptive, well disposed, and attentive.
- The statement of the case, or narratio. it sets out the facts as the speaker wishes the audience to understand them and should be brief, clear, and plausible. Quintilian explained that in the narratio "we shall for instance represent a person accused of theft as covetous, accused of adultery as lustful, accused of homicides as rash, or attribute the opposite qualities to these persons if we are defending them; further we must do the same with place, time and the like."
- A listing of the major tenets of the argument, or divisio (sometimes known as partitio). It has two functions: to name the issues in dispute and to list the arguments to be used in the order they will appear.
- The proof of the case, or confirmatio. It confirms or validates the material given in the narratio and partitio.
- The refutation of possible opposing arguments, or confutatio. If the rhetor anticipates that certain people in his audience may disagree with his speech, he must be prepared to refute the argument that could possibly be presented in opposition to his original speech.
- The conclusion, or peroratio. Cicero taught that a rhetor can do three things in this part: summarize his arguments, try to discredit anyone who disagrees with him, and arouse sympathy for himself, his clients, or his case.

Quintilian, writing in the late first century AD, reported that most authorities divided the speech into five parts: exordium, statement of facts, proof, refutation, and peroration, arguing that partition was not a separate part of speech but rather an aspect of arrangement that applies throughout it.

While this structure might appear to be very rigid, it was in practice subject to modification. The Rhetorica ad Herennium, for example, distinguised arrangement according to the rules of the art from arrangement adapted to the circumstances of the case, while allowing the speaker to rearrange the structure when it strengthened their case: for instance, if the audience had been worn out by the opponent's long speech, the speaker might omit the introduction and begin with facts or with a strong argument. Within the proof, it advised placing the strongest arguments at the beginning and the end, with those medium strengths in the middle, since the last argument is the one the audience rememebers best; the author compares this to drawing up soldiers for battle.

Finally, dispositio was also considered an iterative process, particularly in conjunction with inventio. The very process of organizing arguments might result in the need to discover and research new ones. Quintilian stressed that the part spoken first is not necessarily the part to be considered first: the orator should first study the nature of the case, the point at issue, and the arguments on both sides, and only then decide how to state the facts and open the speech. An orator would refine his arguments and their organization until they were arranged properly. He would then proceed to those topics that are generally associated with rhetoric presently—the development of the style and delivery of the arguments.

=== Exordium ===
In the exordium, the orator states the purpose of the discourse and prepares the audience to be receptive, well disposed, and attentive. In doing this, they need to consider several things:

- What kind of cause is he presenting? For instance, is it an honorable cause (defense of a hero) or a dishonorable one (defense of a murderer)? The Rhetorica ad Herennium classes causes as honorable, discreditable, doubtful, or petty; Cicero lists five kinds: honorable, astonishing, low, doubtful, and obscure.
- Should a direct beginning be favoured, or should the beginning be more subtle and indirect? The handbooks call these the direct opening and the subtle approach. Subtle approach is needed when the cause is discreditable, when the opponent has already won the audience over, or when the audience is tired of listening.
- In what manner ought the speaker to proceed (e.g., humorously or seriously)? A weary audience might be won back by opening with something funny and or attention grabbing.
- The speaker should introduce their own character or credentials, so as to make the audience predisposed to believing their arguments.
- If required, or possible, the speaker might also question the character or credentials of his opponent. The Rhetorica ad Herennium lists four sources of goodwill: the speaker, the opponent, the audience, and the facts themselves.
- Lastly, the speaker must avoid certain faults in the introduction. For example, this excerpt from the Roman Rhetorica ad Herennium lists several faults:

In the Introduction of a cause we must make sure that our style is temperate and that the words are in current use, so that the discourse seems unprepared. An Introduction is faulty if it can be applied as well to a number of causes; that is called a banal Introduction. Again, an Introduction which the adversary can use no less well is faulty, and that is called a common Introduction. That Introduction, again, is faulty which the opponent can turn to his own use against you, that is faulty which has been composed in too laboured a style, or is too long; and that which does not appear to have grown out of the cause itself in such a way to have an intimate connection with the Statement of Facts; and, finally, that which fails to make the hearer well disposed or receptive or attentive.

In short, the exordium was the portion of the discourse in which the orator would prepare the audience to hear his arguments in a favorable mindset. "An exordium can serve different kinds of functions in the differing species of rhetoric, but in all of them some of the major themes of the coming discourse will be announced in advance".

=== Narratio ===
The narratio, or statement of facts, follows the exordium. The Rhetorica ad Herennium distinguishes three kinds of narrative. The narrative states the case in order to win a decision, the narrative that states the case in order to win a decision. The narrative introduced to win belief, to incriminate the opponent, or to make a transition. The narrative is only used as a school exercise.

A narration was to be brief, clear, and plausible. It comes from beginning the story at the right point, summarizing, and avoiding digressions. Making sure that the information at hand is clearly understood, from telling events in order in which they happened, in plain language, while leaving nothing worth noting out.

Quintilian argued that a statement of facts was not always needed, for instance, when the case was very short, or when the facts were already well known to the judge. However, he held that its purpose was not to merely inform the judge but to also persuade him.

=== Partitio ===
The partitio or divisio followed the narration. The speaker first stated which points both sides agreed on and which remained at dispute, then briefly listed the points that still need to be argued; the Rhetorica ad Herennium recommonds no more than three points. Cicero asks that the partition to be brief, complete, and concise. Quintilian discusses it in the fifth chapter of his fourth book.

=== Confirmatio and confutatio ===
The proof and the refutation were regarded as the decisive parts of the speech, the Rhetorica ad Herennium says that the whope hope of victory rests on them, both are planned by first identifying the type of issue at hand. Cicero defines the confirmation as the part of the speech that lends creditbility, authority, and support of the case. The refutation weakens the opponent's arguments, for example, by showing that a premise is false, that an argument could server either side, or that it is trivial or irrelevant, or by answering it with an argument of equal or greater strength.

Arrangement also applied inside individual arguments: the Rhetorica ad Herennium describes a complete argument as a made proposition, a reason, a proof of reason, an embellishment, and a resume. Aristotle had treated refutation simply as a part of the proof.

=== Peroratio ===
The peroratio ("peroration"), as the final part of a speech, had two main purposes in classical rhetoric: to remind the audience of the main points of the speech (recapitulatio) and to influence their emotions (affectus). The role of the peroration was defined by Greek writers on rhetoric, who termed it epilogos; but it is most often associated with Roman orators, who made frequent use of emotional appeals. A famous example was the speech of Marcus Antonius in defence of Aquillius, during which Antonius tore open the tunic of Aquillius to reveal his battle scars.

During the first century B.C. it was common for two or more speakers to appear on each side in major court cases. In such cases it was considered an honour to be asked to deliver the peroration.
