= Elocutio =

Third canon of classical rhetoric

Elocutio (lexis or phrasis in Greek) is a Latin term for the mastery of rhetorical devices and figures of speech in Western classical rhetoric. Elocutio or style is the third of the five canons of classical rhetoric (the others being inventio, dispositio, memoria, and pronuntiatio) that concern the craft and delivery of speeches and writing.

== Etymology ==
The word elocutio comes from the Latin word loquor, "to speak". Elocutio typically refers to rhetorical style. Similar terms are eloquence and elocution.

== Elements ==
An orator or writer had a number of things to decide in developing a style for a particular discourse.

=== Levels of style ===
First, there was the level of style; plain (attenuata or subtile), middle (mediocris or robusta), or high (florida or gravis). Writers were instructed to match the basic style to their subject matter and audience. For instance, Quintilian in his Institutio Oratoria deemed the plain style suitable for instruction, the middle for moving oration, and the high for charming discourse. Today, elocution and rhetoric are associated with the last of the styles, but for rhetoricians, each style was useful in rhetoric.

=== Virtues of style ===
The ancient authors agreed that the four ingredients necessary to achieve good style included correctness, clearness, appropriateness, and ornament.

Sometimes translated as "purity", correctness meant that rhetors should use words that were current and adhered to the grammatical rules of whatever language they wrote. Correctness rules are standards of grammar and usage drawn from traditional grammar.

In regard to clarity, most ancient teachers felt that clarity meant that rhetors should use words in their ordinary or everyday senses. The object of clarity was to allow meaning to "shine through" like light through a window.

Appropriateness probably derives from the Greek rhetorical notion to prepon, meaning to say or do whatever is fitting in a given situation. Ancient teachers taught that close attention to Kairos will help to determine the appropriate style.

The last and most important of the excellences of style is ornament, which is defined as extraordinary or unusual use of language.

=== Figures of style ===
Ornamentation was divided into three broad categories: figures of speech, figures of thought, and tropes. Figures of speech are any artful patterning or arrangement of language. Figures of thought are artful presentations of ideas, feelings, concepts and figures of thought that depart from the ordinary patterns of argument. Tropes are any artful substitution of one term for another.

A great amount of attention was paid to figures of speech, which were classified into various types and subtypes. One Renaissance writer, Henry Peacham, enumerated 184 different figures of speech, but it could be argued that it was a manifestation of the increasing overemphasis on style that began in the Renaissance.

Also important to elocutio were subjects that would now be generally regarded as grammatical: the proper use of punctuation and conjunctions; the desirable order of words in a sentence (unlike English, many languages are not as dependent on word order to establish relationships between words and so choices of word order may revolve more around form than function); and the length of sentences.

== See also ==
- Writing style
- Figure of speech
- Rhetoric
