= Inventio =

Canon of rhetoric

Inventio, one of the five canons of rhetoric, is the method used for the discovery of arguments in Western rhetoric and comes from the Latin word, meaning "invention" or "discovery". Inventio is the central, indispensable canon of rhetoric, and traditionally means a systematic search for arguments.

Speakers use inventio when they begin the thought process of forming and developing an effective argument. Often, the invention phase can be seen as the first step in an attempt to generate ideas or create an argument that is convincing and compelling. The other four canons of classical rhetoric (namely dispositio, elocutio, memoria, and pronuntiatio) rely on their interrelationship with invention.

== Purpose ==
According to Crowley and Hawhee, invention is the division of rhetoric that investigates the possible means by which proofs can be discovered. It supplies the speaker and writers with sets of instructions or ideas that help them to find and compose arguments that are appropriate for a given rhetorical situation.

For personal and lyric essays, narratives, and descriptive writing, invention techniques help writers draw from their memory and observation for the kinds of details that will add depth to their essays.

The first direction of invention aims toward deriving heuristic procedures or systematic strategies that will aid students in discovering and generating ideas about which they might write; the second direction of invention is characterized by how writers establish "voice" in writing and realize individual selves in discourse.

One of the oldest criticisms of rhetoric is that as an art it has no proper subject matter. In other words, an orator might speak on any topic, with his success being measured purely on the brilliance of his rhetorical skills. This aspect of rhetoric is one reason why Plato attacked what he saw as empty rhetoric on the part of sophist philosophers such as Gorgias.

Aristotle, in his works on rhetoric, answered Plato's charges by arguing that reason and rhetoric are intertwined ("Rhetoric is the counterpart of Dialectic" is the first sentence of his Rhetoric). In Aristotle's view, dialectical reasoning is the mechanism for discovering universal truths; rhetoric is the method for clarifying and communicating these principles to others. And in order to communicate effectively, an orator must be able to assemble proper arguments that support a thesis.

Inventio, therefore, is the systematic discovery of rhetorical practices. In the Greek and Roman traditions, rhetorical practices are often but not always arguments. Aristotle, as well as later writers on rhetoric, such as Cicero and Quintilian, devoted considerable attention to developing and formalizing the discipline of rhetorical invention. Two important concepts within invention were topoi and stasis. Other rhetorical cultures seem to have additional means of locating "available means". Historian of Celtic poetics Robert Graves credited analepsis as a method of inventing his historical arguments in The White Goddess, and the Mazatec medicine woman Maria Sabina credited the hallucinogenic psilocybe mushroom with the flow of her discourse. The philosopher Jacques Derrida described inventio as the "invention of the other."

Janice Lauer proposes that invention should be: (1) applicable to a wide variety of writing situations so that they will transcend a particular topic and can be internalized by the student; (2) flexible in direction allowing a thinker to return to a previous step or skip to an inviting one as the evolving idea suggests; and (3) highly generative by involving the writer in various operations—such as visualizing, classifying, defining, rearranging, and dividing—that are known to stimulate insights.

== Topoi ==
In classical rhetoric, arguments are obtained from various sources of information, or topoi (Ancient Greek: τόπος, 'places'; i.e. "places to find something"), also called by the Latin name loci (cf. Literary topoi). Topoi are categories that help delineate the relationships among ideas; Aristotle divided these into "common" and "special" groups.

In the common group could be found such categories as laws, witnesses, contracts, oaths, comparisons of similarity, difference, or degree, definitions of things, division of things (whole or parts, for instance), cause and effect, and other items that could be analyzed, researched, or documented.

Modern writers and students use these topics, as well, when discovering arguments, although today more emphasis is placed on scientific facts, statistics, and other "hard" evidence. Classical rhetoricians saw many areas of inquiry that today's writer might view as being purely in the province of "logic", developing syllogisms, finding contradictions, as being of equal or greater importance. Barbara Warnick has compared the 28 topics of Aristotle's Rhetoric and topical schemes of Chaïm Perelman and Lucie Olbrechts-Tyteca's The New Rhetoric to illustrate major differences of rhetoric throughout these time periods. For example, two of Aristotle's topics "Opponent's Utterance" and "Response to Slander" were more relevant to ancient debates in the practice of Athenian law, in which every citizen was his or her own lawyer. On the other hand, Perelman and Olbrechts-Tytecha's schemes were meant to be comprehensive rather than outlining every single detail of speaking. While Aristotle's Rhetoric focused mainly on oral endeavors, Perelman and Olbrechts-Tyteca's The New Rhetoric dealt with written arguments. According to Warnick, another difference between the two systems is that Aristotle developed Rhetoric as a way of spreading the practice of rhetoric so it could be performed and taught correctly. Perelman and Olbrechts-Tytecha's The New Rhetoric emphasized the study of rhetoric, focusing more on the understanding of the topic rather than the practice of it.

Special topoi included such concepts as justice or injustice, virtue, good, and worthiness. Again, these are areas of inquiry seen by many today as belonging to other arts, but from Greek times through the Renaissance, these were considered integral to the study and practice of rhetoric.

Topics (or topoi) can be used to invent arguments and also to conceptualize and formulate the single-sentence declarative thesis. Edward P.J. Corbett, Robert Connors, Richard P. Hughes, and P. Albert Duhamel define topics as "ways of probing one's subject in order to find the means to develop that subject". They issued four common topics that are most useful to students: definition, analogy, consequence, and testimony. Definition involves the creation of a thesis by taking a fact or an idea and explaining it by precisely identifying its nature; it always asks the question "What is/was it?" Analogy is concerned with discovering resemblances or differences between two or more things proceeding from known to unknown; it is a useful tool for investigating comparisons and contrasts because it always asks the question "What is it like or unlike?" Consequence investigates phenomena costs to effect-to-cause pattern, best established through probabilities from patterns that have previously occurred. It always answers the question "What caused/causes/will cause it?" Testimony relies on appeals to an authority (such as an expert opinion, statistics, or the law), and it always answers the question "What does an authority say about it?" "Ultimately a thesis or an argument must say something about the real world. Teaching the topics requires using examples and good examples are to be had by applying each topic to a definite subject and coming up with several thesis statements".

== Modes of persuasion ==
Aristotle described three "modes of persuasion," or "appeals." The first dealt with the matter of the case (logos), the second dealt with the character of the speaker (ethos), and the third dealt with the emotions of the audience (pathos). Each mode of persuasion can be inventional, helping an orator create an effective argument.

As Aristotle explains, logos, often referred to as the "logical" appeal, uses the arguments present in the case itself to appeal to the audience's reason. Aristotle writes that logos depends on "the proof, or apparent proof, provided by the words of the speech itself." Logos appeals work "when we have proved a truth or an apparent truth by means of the persuasive arguments suitable to the case in question." Inventio is linked with logos such that it deals with what an author would say as opposed to how it might be said.

Aristotle defined ethos as an appeal based on a speaker's character within a persuasive act. Later, the Roman rhetorician Cicero expanded this definition to contain elements of character outside a particular rhetorical act. Most rhetoric scholars today combine the two definitions, understanding ethos to mean character both inside and outside a rhetorical circumstance. Speakers use the mode of ethos when they create an argument based on their own character. When relying on ethos, a speaker uses personal "trustworthiness or credibility" to persuade the audience to believe their specific argument on a particular topic (Ramage 81). For example, if a presidential candidate has a long history of philanthropy, he or she will invent an argument that demonstrates personal good character in order to convince the audience that he or she is the best candidate for office.

Pathos represents an appeal to the audience's emotions. This appeal can be achieved by the use of metaphors, storytelling, or general passion. In order to appeal to an audience's emotions during the speech's delivery, the speaker must first take the audience's emotion into account during the early invention phase. For example, if a presidential candidate grew up poor and managed to succeed in life through hard work and education, then the candidate would have to apply that story to the speech-inventing process in order to appeal to the audience's emotions. This storytelling draws upon the common "bootstraps" narrative of American culture, one that often appeals to the emotions of the U.S. electorate.

== Stasis ==
According to rhetorical scholar Thomas O. Sloane, Cicero described rhetoric as the devising of true or seemingly true arguments for the sake of making one's case appear probable. Therefore, a speaker must debate both sides of an argument to invent an effective argument. Sloane goes on to say it is important for a speaker to critique every aspect of his or her argument. Ciceronian invention is simply an analytical process of argument. However, as a theorist of law, Cicero put forward a specific procedure commonly referred to as stasis theory.

Stasis is a procedure by which a speaker poses questions in order to clarify the main issues and persuasive points of a speech or debate. This procedure allows the speaker to critically question each point, assessing the relative worth of each point as appropriate to the substance of the case and to its capacity to persuade an audience.

Using stasis theory gives the speaker numerous advantages that will help them excel in persuading. According to Crowley and Hawhee, the following advantages may accrue in the use of stasis theory.

- Allows the speaker to clarify his or her thinking about the point in dispute.
- Allows the speaker to consider the assumption and values an audience holds.
- Establishes certain areas in which more research and effort needs to be spent.
- Distinguishes which points are crucial to an effective argument.
- Guides the speaker towards building an effective arrangement for their argument or speech.

There are four types of stasis: conjectural (question of fact: Is/was it?), definitional (question of definition: What is/what is its meaning?), qualitative (question of quality: How good or bad is/was it), and translative (question of place or procedure: Is/was this appropriate process or place to handle the matter?). For instance, a lawyer defending someone accused of damaging property might pose the following questions:

- Question of fact: did the person damage the item? (conjectural)
- Question of definition: was the damage minor or major? (definitional)
- Question of quality: was he justified in damaging the item? (qualitative)
- Question of jurisdiction: should this be a civil or criminal trial? (translative)

The question of fact is key as the first step in formulating any argument is separating the true from the false. If the terms of the argument at hand cannot be agreed on, the discussion will not move in any positive direction. Going back and forth attacking sources of information is not conducive to making any real progress, so an emphasis on using only solid information and evidence-based anecdotes is at the crucial to achieving stasis

The question of definition means to define what, exactly, the issue of concern is, and what, if any, biases or preconceptions our arguments hold. Then, categorizing the problem is the next focus, agreeing on the class of the event and therefore the attitude with which it should be approached. A political disagreement should be investigated with a different lens than a criminal case, for example, as they are concerns of a different nature.

The question of quality means identifying the magnitude of the event, the wider impacts, as well as what would happen if no action were to be taken. Identifying if this problem is important as part of a bigger picture is key to preparing a sound argument, as well as figuring out whether or not it is a cause worth pursuing. The quality aspect of stasis comes down to deciding if this particular problem requires attention, and at what cost will a resolution come about.

The question of jurisdiction means formulating a plan of action. Just as we calculate whether the particular problem is worth the energy in the quality category, here we make the decision to take action. A plan of action includes determining what kind of people should be involved in solving this problem, and what strategy these people will use.

== In the rhetorical tradition ==
Invention also entails the adaptation of ideas and stylistic devices to unfamiliar audiences. Rhetorical scholar John M. Murphy argues that rhetorical traditions consist of common patterns of language use and organized "social knowledge" of communities that make resources available for the invention of effective arguments. Invention allows these rhetorical traditions to be adapted across cultural differences or situations. Murphy provides an example in which an orator would blend several rhetorical traditions: one by which the orator might primarily identify and another by which the audience might identify, thus merging speaker and audience through a display of interconnected rhetorical traditions.

To Cicero, traditional rhetoric was a "mode of thought" and to attain this rhetoric it is required to make the "true nature of rhetorical inventio" apparent. Thomas O. Sloane, a rhetorical scholar, discusses that inventio in the rhetorical tradition specifically refers to addressing the pros and cons of an argumentation. Sloane argues that it is required when using inventio as a tool that one must not only consider the discourse at hand but the discourses that accompany the positives and negatives attached. In further explanation, one must debate all sides of an argument "or one's inventio will remain not fully invented." In modern revivals of rhetoric, Sloane argues along with Reed Way Dasenbrock that these pros and cons of inventio do not have as much emphasis as they did in Cicero. This lack of attention to different sides of an argument is why Dasenbrock believes that the revival of rhetoric "is relevant; [but] it isn't complete."

== Amplification and invention ==
Amplification is a term in rhetoric defined as the enrichment of words to increase rhetorical effect. It is closely related to invention such that it deals with the development and progression of notions, drawing from the topics of invention. Topics of invention can also be seen as topics of amplification, especially those of division, definition, and comparison.

== See also ==
- Rhetorical reason
