= Memoria =

Term for aspects involving memory in Western classical rhetoric

Memoria is one of the five cannons in classical rhetoric involving memory in Western classical rhetoric. Memoria is the discipline of recalling the arguments of a discourse. The word is Latin, and can be translated as "memory". The four other canons include inventio, dispositio, elocutio, and pronuntiatio, which are concerned with the crafting and delivery of speeches and prose.

The art of rhetoric grew out of oratory, which was the central medium for intellectual and political life in ancient Greece. Legal proceedings, political debates, philosophical inquiry were all conducted through spoken discourse. Many of the great texts from that age were not written texts penned by the authors we associate them with, but were instead orations written down by followers and students. In Roman times, while there was a much greater body of written work, oration was primarily the medium for critical debate. Good orators were expected to deliver their speeches without such written or visual aid.

The memorization of speeches influences the structure of modern discourse. For example, as part of dispositio, some attention was paid to creating structures (such as the divisio, an outline of the major arguments of a discourse) that would also aid memory. Some writers also discuss the use of various mnemonic devices to assist speakers.

Rhetoricians also viewed memoria as requiring more than just rote memorization. Rather, the orator also had to have at his command a wide body of knowledge to permit improvisation, to respond to questions, and to refute opposing arguments. Where today's speech-making tends to be a staged, one-way affair, in former times, much oration occurred as part of debates, dialogues, and other settings, in which orators had to react to others. Moreover, rhetoricians also recognized that the credibility of a speaker depended not just on the strength of his prepared arguments, but on the audience's perceptions of the speaker. In Greece, Rome, and Renaissance Europe, a speaker's familiarity of many areas of learning was seen as a virtue.

== In the Renaissance ==
When the Humanists took up the ideas on memory found the writings of Classical authors, memoria played an important role in the pedagogical system. Texts were learned first by rote memorization, then re-read for meaning. Children's ability to memorize was aided by "memory tables", which were first available in manuscript form, and were, from the 1470s onwards, some of the first products of the printing press. (Source: Paul Gehl, A Moral Art: Grammar, Society, and Culture in Trecento Florence (1993).)

== Memory and kairos ==
Memory, the fourth canon of rhetoric, and invention, the first canon, are connected. The ad Herennium states that memory is the "treasury of things invented", indirectly referring to the custom of accumulating commonplaces. Hence, for a rhetor, memory is as much related to the need to extemporize as to the necessity to memorize a discourse for delivery; in this way it is linked to kairos and to the ideas of copia and amplification (Burton).

Crowley and Hawhee state about memory and kairos, "... kairos and memory were partnered in several ways. First, both require a kind of 'attunement' in that the rhetor who is gathering items for reserve in the memory must be thinking simultaneously about what's available now that might be useful later. Secondly, memory requires an attunement during the moment of speaking or composing, a recognition of the right time for recalling an illustrative example, an argument, and so on" (317).

== Memory systems ==
Ancient peoples used elaborate systems, such as the method of loci, to store large amounts of information in their memories. Today, we use literate and electronic memory systems. Literate memory systems include books, periodicals, and libraries. Electronic systems include computers, databases, computer software, the World Wide Web, and other artificial memory devices (Crowley and Hawhee 325–28).

== Three elements of the canon of memory ==
=== Memorizing one's speech ===
Centuries ago, ancient orators had to memorize and present speeches without the help of note cards or crib sheets. Notetaking, as a way to remember certain things, was looked down upon in ancient cultures. In his Phaedrus, Plato has Socrates explaining that relying on writing or taking notes weakened the mind and memory:

"If men learn this, it will implant forgetfulness in their souls: they will cease to exercise memory because they rely on that which is written, calling things to remembrance no longer from within themselves."

Any Greek in ancient times who was caught using the note-taking method would be laughed at and deemed "weak-minded". Nowadays, it is much more common for speakers to use note cards, though speeches are much more impressive without the use of notes.

Using memory during a speech can also affect how the orator influences the audience. When the speaker addresses the audiences relying solely on their memory, they build a certain amount of ethos within the relationship. Memoria in relation to ethos during a speech situation can be described as a certain amount trustworthiness felt between the audience, as well as a level of similarity, authority, or expertise that the orator has over the audience. Unlike ancient Greece, in today's society, it is much more acceptable for politicians and for people of authority to use aids when delivering addresses. Although it could be viewed as an aid to use notes or teleprompters, greater importance is placed on actually conveying the information to the audience in a clear and concise manner.

=== Making one's speech memorable ===
For ancient orators, the excellence of how a speech was presented was more important than the simple delivery of the speech. An important feature of delivering a speech was finding ways to make one's audience remember one's speech topic. One had to be sure to one's audience learned the information or ideas presented to it.

=== Keeping a treasury of rhetorical fodder ===
The third element of memory has to do with using quotes, facts, or anecdotes that could be used in future speeches. A professional orator is known to always have a treasury of rhetorical fodder close at all times.
