= Mode (literature) =

Literary manner not tied to a particular form

In literature and other artistic media, a mode is an unspecific critical term usually designating a broad but identifiable kind of literary method, mood, or manner that is not tied exclusively to a particular form or genre. Examples are the satiric mode, the ironic, the comic, the pastoral, and the didactic.

== History ==
In his Poetics, the ancient Greek philosopher Aristotle uses 'mode' in a more specific sense. Kinds of poetry, he writes, may be differentiated in three ways: according to their medium of imitation, according to their objects of imitation, and according to their mode or 'manner' of imitation (section I). "For the medium being the same, and the objects the same, the poet may imitate by narration—in which case he can either take another personality as Homer does, or speak in his own person, unchanged—or he may present all his characters as living and moving before us" (section III). According to this definition, 'narrative' and 'dramatic' are modes of fiction:

"This is not merely a technical distinction but constitutes, rather, one of the cardinal principles of a poetics of the drama as opposed to one of narrative fiction. The distinction is, indeed, implicit in Aristotle's differentiation of representational modes, namely diegesis (narrative description) versus mimesis (direct imitation). It has, as we shall see, important consequences for both the logic and the language of the drama."

== Usage ==
=== Fiction-writing ===
Fiction is a form of narrative, one of the four rhetorical modes of discourse. Fiction-writing also has distinct forms of expression, or modes, each with its own purposes and conventions. Agent and author Evan Marshall identifies five fiction-writing modes: action, summary, dialogue, feelings/thoughts, and background. Author and writing-instructor Jessica Page Morrell lists six delivery modes for fiction-writing: action, exposition, description, dialogue, summary, and transition. Author Peter Selgin refers to methods, including action, dialogue, thoughts, summary, scene, and description.

==== Summarization ====
Summarization (also referred to as summary, narration, or narrative summary) is the fiction-writing mode whereby story events are condensed. The reader is told what happens, rather than having it shown. In the fiction-writing axiom "Show, don't tell" the "tell" is often in the form of summarization.

Summarization has important uses:

- To connect one part of a story to another
- To report events whose details aren't important
- To telescope time
- To convey an emotional state over an extended period of time
- To vary the rhythm and texture of the writing

The main advantage of summary is that it takes up less space. According to author Orson Scott Card, either action or summarization could be right, either could be wrong. Factors such as rhythm, pace, and tone come into play. The objective is to get the right balance between telling versus showing, action versus summarization.

==== Introspection ====
Introspection (also referred to as internal dialogue, interior monologue, self-talk) is the fiction-writing mode used to convey a character's thoughts. As explained by Renni Browne and Dave King, "One of the great gifts of literature is that it allows for the expression of unexpressed thoughts ..." According to Nancy Kress, a character's thoughts can greatly enhance a story: deepening characterization, increasing tension, and widening the scope of a story. As outlined by Jack M. Bickham, thought plays a critical role in both scene and sequel.

=== Essay-writing ===
According to Frederick Crews, it is traditional and useful to think of essays as falling into four types, corresponding to four basic functions of prose: description, or picturing; narration, or telling; exposition, or explaining; and argument, or convincing. Susan Anker distinguishes between nine different modes of essay writing: narration, or writing that tells stories; illustration, or writing that gives examples; description, or writing that creates pictures in words; process analysis, or writing that explains how things happen; classification, or writing that sorts things into groups; definition, or writing that tells what something means; comparison and contrast, or writing that shows similarities and differences; cause and effect, or writing that explains reasons or results; and argument, or writing that persuades.

== See also ==
- Literary modes, Northrop Frye's theory of fictional and thematic types by mode
