= Scene and sequel =

Types of written passages used by authors

Scene and sequel are the two types of written passages used by authors to advance the plot of a story. Scenes propel a story forward as the character attempts to achieve a goal. Sequels provide an opportunity for the character to react to the scene, analyze the new situation, and decide upon the next course of action.

== Scene ==
The concept of a scene in written fiction has evolved over many years. Dwight V. Swain, in Techniques of the Selling Writer (1965) defined a scene as a unit of conflict, an account of an effort to attain a goal despite opposition. According to Swain, the functions of a scene are to provide interest and to advance the story. The structure of a scene, as described by Swain, is (1) goal, (2) conflict, (3) disaster.

In The Art of Fiction (1983), John Gardner described a scene as having an unbroken flow of action without a lapse of time or leap from one setting to another. Over the years, other authors have attempted to improve on the definition of scene, and to explain its use and structure.

== Sequel ==
In addition to defining a scene, Swain described a sequel as a unit of transition that links two scenes, adding that a sequel functions to translate disaster into a goal, telescope reality, and control tempo. Swain also described the structure of a sequel as (1) reaction, (2) dilemma, and (3) decision. Other authors have attempted to improve on the definition of a sequel and to explain its use and structure.

== Proactive vs. reactive ==
Rather than viewing scenes and sequels as distinct types of passages, some authors express the concept as two types of scenes: proactive and reactive.

== Scenes and sequels ==
Swain defined, described, and explained scene and sequel as if they were separate entities, but then he explained that they must complement each other, linking together smoothly into a story. He went on to observe that

- An author controls pacing with the proportion of scene to sequel.
- Flexibility is important, versus a mechanical approach.
- The peaks and valleys in a diagram of a story correspond to scenes and sequels.

== Structural units of fiction ==
The structural units of fiction writing comprise all fiction.

- A chapter is a segment of writing delineated by a form of punctuation called a chapter break. Prologue and epilogue are two specialized types of chapters.
- A chapter may include one or more sections, passages separated by another form of punctuation called a section break.
- Scenes and sequels are specialized passages of writing. A scene is a passage of writing in which the character attempts to achieve a goal. A sequel is a passage of writing in which the character reacts reflectively to the previous scene.
- Some novels, especially long ones, may be further divided into books or parts, each including two or more chapters.
- The smallest units of writing are words, phrases, clauses, sentences, and paragraphs.
- Two or more paragraphs with some common purpose are referred to as passages or segments of writing.

== Types of passages ==
Passages of writing may be classified into four groups: (1) scenes, (2) sequels, (3) passages that are neither scenes nor sequels, and (4) passages that include elements of both scenes and sequels. Examples of passages that are neither scenes nor sequels include fragments of scenes or sequels and passages of narration, description, or exposition. An example of a passage that includes elements of both scenes and sequels is the problem-solving passage, common in mystery and detective stories.

== Types of scenes ==
Scenes may be classified by their position within the story (such as an opening scene or a climax scene). A scene may be classified by the fiction-writing mode that dominates its presentation (as in an action scene or a dialogue scene). Some scenes have specialized roles (such as flashback scenes and flashforward scenes).

== The Anatomy of a Scene ==
Before a writer crafts a scene, its purpose must be known as it relates to the story, because each scene must advance the plot. If nothing new happens, if the character has not been changed, then the scene is not effective. Each scene should be a response to the one that came before it. Something happens that makes the character react or change. It can be physically, emotionally, or both. Then the character must decide what to do next. The previous scene's ending triggers the next scene's beginning. Just like the whole story, each scene has a beginning, middle, and end. And much like the start of any story, each scene's beginning must hook the reader. The middle can not lag. Tension or conflict must rise. It does not need to be action-packed. Maybe there is unspoken tension between characters, internal conflict for the protagonist, or new information is discovered. The scene ends with the character processing what just happened, and their response (a reaction, a decision) sets up the beginning of the next scene. Each scene starts with an action, tensions rise, and it ends with a reaction.

== See also ==
- Dramatic structure
- Literary element
- Scene (drama)
- Theatrical scenery
