= Transition (fiction) =

Fiction-writing mode

Transitions in fiction are words, phrases, sentences, paragraphs, or punctuation that may be used to signal various changes in a story, including changes in time, location, point-of-view character, mood, tone, emotion, and pace. Transitions are sometimes listed as one of various fiction-writing modes.

== Purpose ==
Transitions provide for a seamless narrative flow as a story shifts in time, location, or point-of view. They aid the internal logic of a story by moving readers from sentence to sentence, paragraph to paragraph, idea to idea, scene to scene, and chapter to chapter with grace and ease. Transitions in fiction also refer to how the trajectory of characters changes according to the various factors that affect them. The spatial and temporal changes affecting the characters help in the plot development. This shift can also denote a parallel transition that takes place regarding the state of mind of the character.

== Techniques ==
Screenwriters Trey Parker and Matt Stone created the "but and therefore" rule to create transitions that eliminate writer's block and keep narratives engaging. The "but and therefore" rule consists of an approach of replacing the words “and then” with “but" and "therefore” in a story. Thus, because all events become portrayed as challenges and solutions, the narrative has tension, and thus becomes engaging. The "but and therefore" rule applies for all transitions between scenes as well as transitions between actions and reactions within scenes.

== Types ==
Transitions in fiction may take any of several forms, including chapter breaks, section breaks, and summarization.

== See also ==
- Style (fiction)
- Transition (linguistics)
- Writing
