= Action (narrative) =

Literary term; the physical movement of the characters

In literature, action is the physical movement of the characters.

== Action as a literary mode ==
"Action is the mode [that] fiction writers use to show what is happening at any given moment in the story," states Evan Marshall, who identifies five fiction-writing modes: action, summary, dialogue, feelings/thoughts, and background. Jessica Page Morrell lists six delivery modes for fiction-writing: action, exposition, description, dialogue, summary, and transition. Peter Selgin refers to methods, including action, dialogue, thoughts, summary, scene, and description.

While dialogue is the element that brings a story and its characters to life on the page, and narrative gives the story its depth and substance, action creates the movement within a story. Writing a story means weaving all of the elements of fiction together. When it is done right, weaving dialogue, narrative, and action can create a beautiful tapestry. A scene top-heavy with action can feel unreal because it is likely that characters doing something—anything at all—would be talking during the activity.

== See also ==
- Action fiction
- Action film
- Pace (narrative)
- Show, don't tell
