= Fiction-writing mode =

Manner of writing

A fiction-writing mode is a manner of writing imaginary stories with its own set of conventions regarding how, when, and where it should be used.

Fiction is a form of narrative, one of the four rhetorical modes of discourse. Fiction-writing also has distinct forms of expression, or modes, each with its own purposes and conventions. Currently, there is no consensus within the writing community regarding the number and composition of fiction-writing modes and their uses. Some writing modes suggested include action, dialogue, thoughts, summary, scene, description, background, exposition and transition.

== Overview ==
The concept goes back at least as far as Aristotle who, in Poetics, referred to narration and action as different modes or manner of representing something. For many years, fiction writing was described as having two types: narration and dialogue. Evan Marshall, in The Marshall Plan for Novel Writing (1998) noted that writers should know what they are doing at all times. He described what he called fiction-writing modes—the types of writing of which all fiction is made. He listed five modes—action, summary, dialogue, feelings/thoughts, and background—each with its own set of conventions regarding how, when, and where it should be used.

- Jessica Page Morrell, in Between the Lines: Master the Subtle Elements of Fiction Writing (2006), mentioned six delivery modes: action, exposition, description, dialogue, summary, and transition.
- Peter Selgin, in By Cunning and Craft: Sound Advice and Practical Wisdom for Fiction Writers (2007), mentioned five writing methods: action, dialogue, thoughts, summary, and description.
- Mike Klaassen, in Fiction-Writing Modes: Eleven Essential Tools for Bringing Your Story to Life (2015), addressed eleven modes: action, summarization, narration, description, exposition, transition, conversation (dialogue), sensation, introspection, emotion, and recollection.

== Narration ==
In Poetics, Aristotle mentions narration as a mode, or manner of representing something. As a fiction-writing mode, narration is how the narrator communicates directly to the reader. This contrasts with the use of the term "narration" as a rhetorical mode of discourse, where it has a broader meaning which encompasses all written fiction.

== Description ==
Description is the fiction-writing mode for transmitting a mental image of the particulars of a story. Together with dialogue, narration, exposition, and summarization, description is one of the most widely recognized of the fiction-writing modes. Description is more than the amassing of details, it is bringing a scene to life by carefully choosing and arranging words and phrases to produce the desired effect.

== Exposition ==
Broadly defined, exposition is one of four rhetorical modes of discourse. Within the context of fiction-writing modes, exposition is used to convey information. Exposition may be used to add drama to a story, but too much exposition at one time may slow the pace of the story.

== Summarization ==
Summarization, or narrative summary, condenses events to convey, rather than to show, what happens within a story. The "tell" in the axiom "Show, don't tell" is often in the form of summarization. Summarization may be used to:

- connect parts of a story
- report details of less important events
- skip events that are irrelevant to the plot
- convey an emotional state over an extended period of time
- vary the rhythm and texture of the writing

The main advantage of summary is that it takes up less space than other fiction-writing modes. Effective use of summarization requires a balance between showing and telling, action and summary, with rhythm, pace and tone playing a role.

== Introspection ==
Introspection (also referred to as internal dialogue, interior monologue, or self-talk) is the fiction-writing mode used to convey the thoughts of a character, allowing the expression of normally unexpressed thoughts. Introspection may also be used to:

- enhance a story by allowing the character's thoughts to deepen characterisation
- increase tension
- widen the scope of a story
- play a critical role in both scene and sequel

== Recollection ==
Recollection is the fiction-writing mode whereby a character remembers a detail or event. It plays a vital role in conveying backstory by allowing writers to convey information from earlier in the story or from before the beginning of the story. Although recollection is not widely recognized as a distinct mode of fiction-writing, it is a common tool. Recollection could be considered a subset of introspection, but its role in developing backstory separates it from the other thoughts of a character. Effective presentation of recollection has its own unique issues and challenges. For example, timing a recollection to avoid implausible-seeming memories (such as when a character must make a key decision) can be difficult, and should be prompted by a recent plot event.

== Sensation ==
Sensation is used to portray a character's perceptions. It can help draw the reader in by conveying the actual sensations of things comprising the story, breathing life into its physical world. Since the reader has experienced only a portion of the sensations experienced by the character, the author aims to either provoke recall from the reader, or convey the experience, drawing the reader in and maintaining interest in the story.

== Emotion ==
The fiction-writing mode of emotion conveys the feelings of the character, and is a vital component of creative writing. Connecting the character to his or her own emotions allows the author to connect with the reader on an emotional level.

== Action ==
In Poetics, Aristotle refers to action as a mode, or manner of representing something. Action is the demonstration of events as they are happening in a story, and may help readers feel as if they were participating in the plot.

== Transition ==
Transitions in fiction are words, phrases, sentences, paragraphs, or punctuation that may be used to signal various changes in a story, including changes in time, location, point-of-view character, mood, tone, emotion, and pace.

== Categories ==
Fiction-writing modes may be classified into categories of modes with common features.

- Interiority includes modes that reflect the inner workings of the character's mind: introspection, recollection, emotion, and sensation.
- Exteriority includes modes that represent what is outside the character's mind: narration, description, exposition, and transition.
- Dialogue represents a character's speech: conversation.
- Activity includes modes used to portray story events: action and summarization.

== See also ==
- Exposition
- Narrative mode
- Scene and sequel
- Style
- Writing
