= Modes of discourse =

Major types of writing and speaking

The modes of discourse, sometimes known as rhetorical modes, are a broad classification of the major kinds of formal and academic writing (including speech-writing) by their purpose. Traditionally, this refers to these four modes—exposition, narration, description, and argumentation—as first classified by Samuel P. Newman in A Practical System of Rhetoric in 1827. Newman's modes of discourse have long influenced US writing instruction and particularly the design of mass-market writing assessments, despite critiques of the explanatory power of these classifications for non-school writing. Other scholars have devised alternative ways for categorizing writings by purpose.

== Definitions ==
Different definitions of mode apply to different types of writing and public speaking.

Chris Baldick defines mode as an unspecific critical term usually designating a broad but identifiable kind of literary method, mood, or manner that is not tied exclusively to a particular form or genre. Examples are the satiric mode, the ironic, the comic, the pastoral, and the didactic.

Frederick Crews uses the term to mean a type of essay and categorizes essays as falling into four types, corresponding to four basic functions of prose: narration, or telling; description, or picturing; exposition, or explaining; and argument, or convincing. This is probably the most commonly accepted definition.

Susan Anker distinguishes between nine different modes of essay writing: narration, or writing that tells stories; illustration, or writing that gives examples; description, or writing that creates pictures in words; process analysis, or writing that explains how things happen; classification, or writing that sorts things into groups; definition, or writing that tells what something means; comparison and contrast, or writing that shows similarities and differences; cause and effect, or writing that explains reasons or results; and argument, or writing that persuades.

Each fiction-writing mode has its own purposes and conventions. Literary agent and author Evan Marshall identifies five different fiction-writing modes: action, summary, dialogue, feelings/thoughts, and background. Author and writing-instructor Jessica Page Morrell lists six delivery modes for fiction-writing: action, exposition, description, dialogue, summary, and transition. Author Peter Selgin refers to methods, including these six: action, dialogue, thoughts, summary, scene, and description.

== Narration ==
The purpose of narration is to tell a story or narrate an event or series of events. This writing mode frequently uses the tools of descriptive writing (see below), but also exposition. Narration is an especially useful tool for sequencing or putting details and information into some kind of logical order, traditionally chronological. Working with narration helps us see clear sequences separate from other modes.

A narrative essay recounts something that has happened. That something can be as small as a minor personal experience or as large as a war, and the narrator's tone can be either intimate and casual or neutrally objective and solemn. Inevitably, a good part of narration is taken up with describing. But a narrative essay differs from a descriptive one in its emphasis on time and sequence. The essayist turns storyteller, establishing when and in what order a series of related events occurred.

Exactly the same guidelines that hold for a descriptive or narrative essay can be used for the descriptive or narrative paragraph. That is, such a paragraph should be vivid, precise, and climactic, so that the details add up to something more than random observations.

Examples of narration include:

- Anecdote
- Autobiography
- Biography
- Novel
- Oral history
- Short story
- Travel literature

== Description ==
The purpose of description is to re-create, invent, or visually present a person, place, event, or action so that the reader can picture that which is being described. Descriptive writing can be found in the other rhetorical modes.

A descriptive essay aims to make vivid a place, an object, a character, or a group. It acts as an imaginative guide to stimulate the thoughts of the reader in the form of allowing the mind to personally interact with what the writer has molded through literary enhancement of thoughtful impressions. The writer tries, not simply to convey facts about the object, but to give readers a direct impression of that object, as if they were standing in its presence. The descriptive writer's task is one of translation: he wants to find words to capture the way his five senses have registered the item, so a reader of those words will have a mental picture of it.

Essays whose governing intent is descriptive or narrative are relatively uncommon in college writing. Exposition and argument tend to prevail.

Exactly the same guidelines that hold for a descriptive or narrative essay can be used for the descriptive or narrative paragraph. That is, such a paragraph should be vivid, precise, and climactic, so that the details add up to something more than random observations.

Examples include:

- Journal writing
- Poetry

== Exposition ==
Expository writing is a type of writing where the purpose is to explain or inform the audience about a topic. It is considered one of the four most common rhetorical modes.

The purpose of expository writing is to explain and analyze information by presenting an idea, relevant evidence, and appropriate discussion. In narrative contexts (such as history and fiction), exposition provides background information to teach or entertain. In other nonfiction contexts (such as technical communication), the purpose is to teach and inform.

The four basic elements of expository writing are the subject being examined; the thesis, or statement of the point the author is trying to prove; the argument, or backing, for the thesis, which consists of data and facts to serve as proof for the thesis; and the conclusion, or restatement of the proved thesis. There are two types of subject, according to Aristotle: thesis, or general question such as, "Ought all people to be kind to one another?" and hypothesis, or specific question: "Ought Elmer to be kind to his enemy Elmo?" One may be aided in the proper formation of a thesis by asking the questions an sit, "Does it exist?"; quid sit, "What is it?"; and quale sit, "What kind is it?"

Examples include:

- Business
  - Business letters
  - Reports
  - Press releases
- Journalism
  - How-to essays, such as recipes and other instructions
  - News article
- Personal
  - Personal letters
  - Wills
- Academic and technical communication
  - Scientific writing
    - Scientific reports
    - Scientific journal articles
  - Academic writing
    - Term papers
    - Textbooks
    - General reference works
      - Encyclopedia articles
  - Technical writing
    - User guides
    - Technical standards

An expository paragraph presents facts, gives directions, defines terms, and so on. It should clearly inform readers about a specific subject. An expository essay is one whose chief aim is to present information or to explain something. To expound is to set forth in detail, so a reader will learn some facts about a given subject. In exposition, as in other rhetorical modes, details must be selected and ordered according to the writer's sense of their importance and interest. Although the expository writer isn't primarily taking a stand on an issue, they can't—and shouldn't try to—keep their opinions completely hidden. To expound is to set forth in detail, so that a reader will learn some facts about a given subject. However, no essay is merely a set of facts. Behind all the details lies an attitude, a point of view. There is no interesting way of expounding certain subjects without at least implying a position.

== Argumentation ==
An argument is a claim made to support or encourage an audience towards believing in a certain idea. In ordinary life, it also refers to a discussion between people representing two (or more) disagreeing sides of an issue. It is often conducted orally, and a formal oral argument between two sides is a debate.

The purpose of argumentation (also called persuasive writing) is to prove the validity of an idea, or point of view, by presenting sound reasoning, discussion, and argument to thoroughly convince the reader. Persuasive writing/persuasion is a type of argumentation with the additional aim to urge the reader to take some form of action.

Examples include:

- Advertising copy
- Critical reviews
- Critiques
- Editorials
- Job application letter
- Job evaluation
- Letter of recommendation
- Letters to the editor
- Résumés

When an essay writer's position is not implied but openly and centrally maintained, the essay is argumentative. An argument is simply a reasoned attempt to have one's opinions accepted. The ideal is to present supporting evidence which points so plainly to the correctness of one's stand that one can afford to be civil and even generous toward those who believe otherwise.

Another form of persuasive rhetoric is the use of humor or satire in order to make a point about some aspect of life or society. Perhaps the most famous example is Jonathan Swift's "A Modest Proposal".

== See also ==
- Fiction writing
- Literature
