= Marshall Plan (software) =

Novel writing software

- Original author: Evan Marshall
- Release: May 16, 2008 for Windows, July 2010 for MAC OS
- Stable release: NovelCreator™ / March 2018
- Operating system: macOS Sierra 10.12, Mac OS X El Capitan 10.11, Mac OS X Yosemite 10.10, Mac OS X Mavericks 10.9. Windows 10, Windows 8, Windows 8.1, Windows 7.
- Type: proprietary
- License: Purchase price includes use on one computer

The Marshall Plan software is a novel writing software to assist in the technical aspects of novel writing. The software automatically plots a novel based on literary agent Evan Marshall's novel writing system in his three-book series, The Marshall Plan for Novel Writing: A 16-Step Program Guaranteed to Take You From Idea to Completed Manuscript, The Marshall Plan Workbook, and The Marshall Plan for Getting Your Novel Published. Marshall Plan software is published by Evan Marshall and Martha Jewett, literary agent and consultant.

== Background ==
Evan Marshall was a correspondent for Writer's Digest and covered commercial fiction. He wrote cover stories on novels, and how to find and work with agents. Marshall's articles appeared in reference anthologies and collected works. He is often interviewed for his expertise in novel writing, and helping novel writers.

Marshall and Jewett own the trademark The Marshall Plan® for software. After several unsuccessful attempts at working with developers, he took computer programming classes at County College of Morris and created the first version of The Marshall Plan software. Professional developers from LogicalVue Software, and BKeeney Software, Inc., programmed subsequent versions.

== Book Series ==
=== The Marshall Plan for Novel Writing ===
The first book in the series describes novel writing as a 16-step process, taking the novel's intended finished length into account from the beginning. Marshall focuses specifically on fiction, identifying it as the writing genre most likely to be picked up by a publisher. Drawing from Dwight V. Swain and Jack Bickham's techniques, Marshall identifies two core plotting units: the action section and the reaction section. Marshall recommends the number, and the type, of action and reaction sections in relation to a novel's length. He also recommends the corresponding story arc with plot points all in a specific order, the number and type of viewpoint characters, the type of opposition, and other elements of plot and character development.

=== The Marshall Plan Workbook ===
The second book in the series concentrates on the fundamental details of producing a novel. The first half of the book assists the writer in building characters, developing plot and setting goals. The second half is the Plan Blueprint, a 58-page section of fill-in-the-blank sheets to help writers produce a novel. The marketing information included focuses on the manuscript itself, how it should look, how many pages, paper weight, etc.

=== The Marshall Plan for Getting Your Novel Published ===
The third book in the series focuses on how to take the next step of sending work to editors and agents, and promoting a novel.

== Software Features ==
NovelCreator™ integrates character development, viewpoint writing, and scene-by-scene plotting within a flexible novel structure. The Marshall Plan story engine creates a novel outline with a click, which the user can customize to their specifications (change the novel's story arc, viewpoint characters, roles, scenes, word length, genre, plot points, and more). Users can also start a novel by creating an outline to their own specifications. The novel outline has moveable scene cards with a complete story arc with scene-by-scene plot points. Other features include novel writing and plotting guidance, a word processor, career guidance, advice on technical aspects of novel writing like character development, story arc and development, viewpoint and main characters, sections, a name dictionary and 138 genres.
