= Mother Lode Musical Theatre =

Musical performing group in California, US

The Mother Lode Musical Theatre was a performing group in Marin County from the 1970s to 2020. It also provided classes to schools and groups. It was most noted for its Drake Pageant and major productions such as Voices of Califia and Gambling Jones.

== Principals ==
Key participants were Corinne Swall, soprano and Monroe Kanouse, composer.

== Productions ==
- Angel Island Jubilee, 1998
- Angel Island Fiesta de Merienda, 1996, 1997
- Bustles & Blooms, 1993
- California Gold Rush, 2004
- California Gold Rush Songbook
- Los Californios, 1992, 1993, 1995
- Coyote & the Human People, an opera for young people, book & libretto, 2000
- Coyote's Tail, book & libretto
- The Courtship of Francisca & Mariano Vallejo, 1997
- Creation of the Earth as Told by Coyote
- Divas of the Golden West, 1976 initial production
- Drake Pageant, Point Reyes, California
- Fiesta Sonoma, 1993
- Gambling Jones, a Gold Rush Gilbert & Sullivan, Sausalito 1987, Orange Coast College, Clark County, Berkeley Performing Arts Coliseum, Palm Desert, 1991.
- Gold Rush Gaeties, A Musical Variety Show, 1988
- Gold Rush Show, Valecito School 1997
- Ho! California
- I Come to Californay-aye, California's Gold Rush cultural history taught through song and dance
- Nightingale of the Gold Rush
- Las Navidades, 1992
- Los Posada, Point Reyes Station 2000 & 2003
- Mother Lode Musical Theatre Performs Victorian Parlor Ballads and Saloon Songs From the Mid-19th Century 1988
- School Days, a day in the Dixie Schoolhouse in 1870, 2001
- The Race to California
- Tule Reed Boat Workbook
- Voices of Califia, Chico 1991, Marin 1989

== Workshops ==
Singers Diction Vocal Caching Method Acting Stage Deportment Character Acting
