= Volobilis biplaga =

Scientific classification
- Kingdom: Animalia
- Phylum: Arthropoda
- Class: Insecta
- Order: Lepidoptera
- Family: Pyralidae
- Genus: Volobilis
- Species: V. biplaga

Binomial name
- Volobilis biplaga Walker, 1863

Species of moth

Volobilis biplaga is a moth of the family Pyralidae first described by Francis Walker in 1863. It is found in Taiwan and Sri Lanka.

== Subspecies ==
- Volobilis biplaga taiwanella Shibuya, 1928
