= Stark Fear =

1962 film by Skip Homeier

- Directed by: Ned Hockman; Skip Homeier (uncredited)
- Written by: Dwight V. Swain (original screenplay)
- Produced by: Joe E. Burke (producer); Ned Hockman (producer); Carl G. Stevenson (associate producer); Dwight V. Swain (producer)
- Starring: See below
- Cinematography: Robert Bethard
- Music by: Lawrence V. Fisher
- Release date: 1962
- Running time: 86 minutes
- Country: United States
- Language: English

Stark Fear is a 1962 low-budget American film directed by Ned Hockman. Filmed almost entirely in Oklahoma, the drama was meant to tell a strong psychological story involving rivalry and hatred.

== Plot ==
Gerald (Jerry) Winslow is an Oklahoma oil company developer, who procures leases for drilling new oil wells. His income depends on the leases he obtains for his employer, and lately he hasn't been earning enough to pay all the bills, so his wife, Ellen, goes to work as a secretary for Cliff Kane, a drilling developer working at a different oil company. On Jerry's birthday Ellen comes home with a cake, a phonograph album, and she's wearing a new black lace bra that she believes will please her husband.

Jerry becomes romantic, until he glimpses the black lace bra, then he calls Ellen a tramp, and accuses her of wearing the lace bra for her boss Cliff. He forces her to call up Cliff and quit her job, then once again calls her a tramp for disrespecting him by getting a job instead of allowing him to support her. Jerry says he's divorcing Ellen, and leaves.

Jerry's boss, Mr. Nedwin, comes to see Ellen, and tells her Jerry took four weeks off work without notice, and she needs to get him back to work or he will be fired. Ellen believes it is her fault for upsetting Jerry, and she goes to see her friend Ruth, a case worker, for help in finding her husband so he doesn't lose his job. Ruth obtains the name and address of Liz, one of Jerry's friends.

Ellen goes to see Liz and learns that, while Jerry told her he was from Pennsylvania, he was from Quehada, Oklahoma, and his boyhood friend was Harvey Sugget. Liz warns her not to go near Harvey, but Ellen says she must find her husband.

In Quehada Ellen meets Harvey's wife Zelda, who says her husband is always running after other women, and one day she'll catch him with someone else and kill him. Ellen finds Harvey, who tells her to meet him at a cemetery that evening. He takes her to the grave of Jerry's mother, who was another Ellen. Harvey says Jerry's mother was a hellion who treated her son cruelly. Jerry left his hometown after her death, but every week someone puts fresh flowers on the mother's grave. He then rapes Ellen in front of Jerry's mother’s grave. Jerry is shown watching the attack.

Afterwards Ellen called Ruth to come and take her home, and Ruth is shown cleaning the bruises on Ellen’s face. She refuses to tell her friend what happened to her. Ellen calls Cliff and asks for her old job back. She tells Ruth she wants to do nothing but work, so she has no time to think about what happened in Quehada. Ruth states that Jerry is no good, but Ellen mustn't give up on love. She says she loved a reporter working for the Daily Oklahoman newspaper, but he left to work for the El Paso Times. She felt a woman shouldn't run after a man, so she didn't follow her loved one to Texas.

Scenes are shown of Ellen and Cliff working together, and Cliff tells her he loves her. He will be spending two years working in Mexico. One of Cliff's coworkers tells Ellen that Cliff and Jerry once worked together. They wanted the same job and Jerry got it. The coworker said Cliff hired her to get back at Jerry. Ellen becomes angry at Cliff for trying to steal another man's wife.

Jerry calls Ellen and says he wants to talk to her. He is at the El Nora motel in room 14, and she is to come and see him. Jerry is sharing the room with Harvey. He exits the room to use a pay phone. Jerry leaves a message for Cliff Kane, telling him what motel room Ellen will be staying at. Then he calls Harvey's wife Zelda to tell her Harvey is in room 14.

Ellen goes to the motel room and finds only Harvey there, who tries to attack her once again. Zelda walks in, catching her husband with another woman. Harvey is afraid his wife will shot him, so he runs outside and into the street, where he is hit and killed by a truck. Jerry comes into the room and begins insulting Ellen. She calls him a sadist who hates all women. Jerry begins strangling her, but Cliff arrives, saves her, and beats Jerry. Cliff proposes to her and asks her to go to Mexico with him, but Ellen tells him to leave, for she is already married.

Ellen returns to Ruth's home, and her friend criticizes Ellen for not going with Cliff. She says she came upon Jerry collapsed on the ground after Cliff had beaten him, and she went through his pockets, finding papers written in Spanish, and a muddy, bloodstained black lace bra. Harvey had ripped the bra off Ellen while he raped her, so she realizes Jerry was there when the attack happened.

Ruth calls the El Paso Times newspaper and asks her former boyfriend for a favor. She's sure someone at the paper keeps track of Americans who go across the border for Mexican divorces, and learns Gerald Winslow divorced Ellen in Mexico. She tells Ellen she has no reason to feel loyalty towards the ex-husband who has treated her so badly. Ruth drives her friend to the airport, and Ellen is able to buy a last minute ticket and get on the plane that Cliff is taking to Mexico. Then Ruth asks how much it costs to buy a one-way ticket to El Paso.

== Cast ==
- Beverly Garland as Ellen Winslow
- Skip Homeier as Gerald (Jerry) Winslow
- Kenneth Tobey as Cliff Kane
- Hannah Stone as Ruth Rogers
- George Clow as Harvey Sugget

== Production ==
Stark Fear was filmed for $150,000, money which came from Oklahomans who bought stock in the film for as little as $10. Several men connected with the University of Oklahoma decided to get into the motion picture business. Ned Hockman had directed short documentary films, and Dwight V. Swain had written novels, and sold stories to pulp magazines. They were inspired by the film Psycho and wanted to make a psychological suspense movie.

Filming mostly took place in Oklahoma City, Norman, and at the University of Oklahoma. During July and August 1960, OU's Delta Delta Delta sorority house was rented for a movie studio. Lexington, Oklahoma was used for scenes of the fictitious town of Quehada. Three days of filming took place in Eureka Springs, Arkansas, the site of a work conference Ellen and Cliff attended.

The film was shot in 30 days, and Beverly Garland stayed an extra two weeks for publicity purposes, taking part in numerous TV interviews. In 2003 Garland returned to Norman for a 40th anniversary showing of Stark Fear. She recalled how much fun everyone had making the film.

Beverly Garland, Skip Homeier, and Kenneth Tobey were the only professional actors hired; all other parts were acted by local Oklahomans. Music was composed and conducted by Lawrence Fisher, the assistant director of the Oklahoma City Symphony. Director Ned Hockman stated in a 2005 interview that no money was made from the film.
