= Mood (narrative) =

Atmosphere of a narrative

In literary and spoken narrative, the mood, or atmosphere, is the emotion or feeling the language evokes in the audience. Mood is created by means of setting (locale and surroundings in which the narrative takes place), attitude of the narrator or characters, and descriptions. Although atmosphere and setting are connected, they may be considered separately to a degree. Atmosphere is the aura of mood that surrounds the story. It is to fiction what the sensory level is to poetry or mise-en-scene is to cinema. Mood is established to affect the reader emotionally and psychologically and to provide a feeling for the narrative.

== Elements ==
Mood is generally created through several different things. Setting, which provides the physical location of the story, is used to create a background in which the story takes place. Different settings can affect the mood of a story differently and usually support or conflict with the other content of the story in some way. For example, the desert may be a setting for a cowboy story and may generate a mood of solitude, desolation, and struggle, among other possible associations. The attitude of the narrator is another element that helps generate mood. As the reader is dependent on the narrator's perspective of the story, they see the story through their lenses, feeling the way the narrator feels about what happens or what is being described. Embedded in the attitude of a narrator are the feelings and emotions which make it up. A similar element that goes into generating mood is diction, that is, the choice and style of words the writer uses. Diction conveys a sensibility as well as portrays the content of a story in specific colors, thus affecting the way the reader feels about it.

== Difference from tone ==
Tone and mood are not the same. The tone of a piece of literature is the speaker's or narrator's attitude towards the subject, rather than what the reader feels, as in mood. Mood is the general feeling or atmosphere that a piece of writing creates within the reader. Mood is produced most effectively through the use of setting, theme, voice and tone. Tone can indicate the narrator's mood, but the overall mood comes from the totality of the written work, even in first-person narratives. The effect a literary work has upon the reader is subjective and produces different associations, while the text made by the author is presented to the reader as an objective thing. The mood is suggested by the elements utilized by the author, but relies on the subjective response from the reader.
