= Backstory =

Events preceding a plot in a story

In a narrative, a backstory or the background (information) is a set of events that establishes a character's past or that precedes and leads up to the main plot. In acting, it is the fictional history of a character before the main plot events that a performer creates during their preparation for the role.

== Usage ==
As a literary device, backstory is often employed to lend depth or believability to the main story. The usefulness of having a dramatic revelation was recognized by Aristotle, in Poetics.

Backstories are usually revealed, partially or in full, chronologically or otherwise, as the main narrative unfolds. However, a story creator may also create portions of a backstory or even an entire backstory that is solely for their own use.

Backstory may be revealed by various means, including flashbacks, dialogue, direct narration, summary, recollection, and exposition.

== Recollection ==
Recollection is the fiction-writing mode whereby a character calls something to mind, or remembers it. A character's memory plays a role for conveying backstory, as it allows a fiction-writer to bring forth information from earlier in the story or from before the beginning of the story. Although recollection is not widely recognized as a distinct fiction-writing mode, recollection is commonly used by authors of fiction.

Orson Scott Card observed that "If it's a memory the character could have called to mind at any point, having her think about it just in time to make a key decision may seem like an implausible coincidence ..." Furthermore, "If the memory is going to prompt a present decision, then the memory in turn must have been prompted by a recent event."

== Shared universe ==
In a shared universe more than one author may shape the same backstory. The later creation of a backstory that conflicts with a previously written main story may require the adjustment device known as retroactive continuity, informally known as "retcon".

== Acting ==
Actors may create their own backstories for characters, going beyond the sometimes meager information in a script. Filling in details helps an actor interpret the script and create fully imagined characters.

== See also ==
- Characterization
- Flashback (narrative)
- Origin story
- Prequel
