= Tone (literature) =

A creative figure's attitude toward both a subject and also an audience

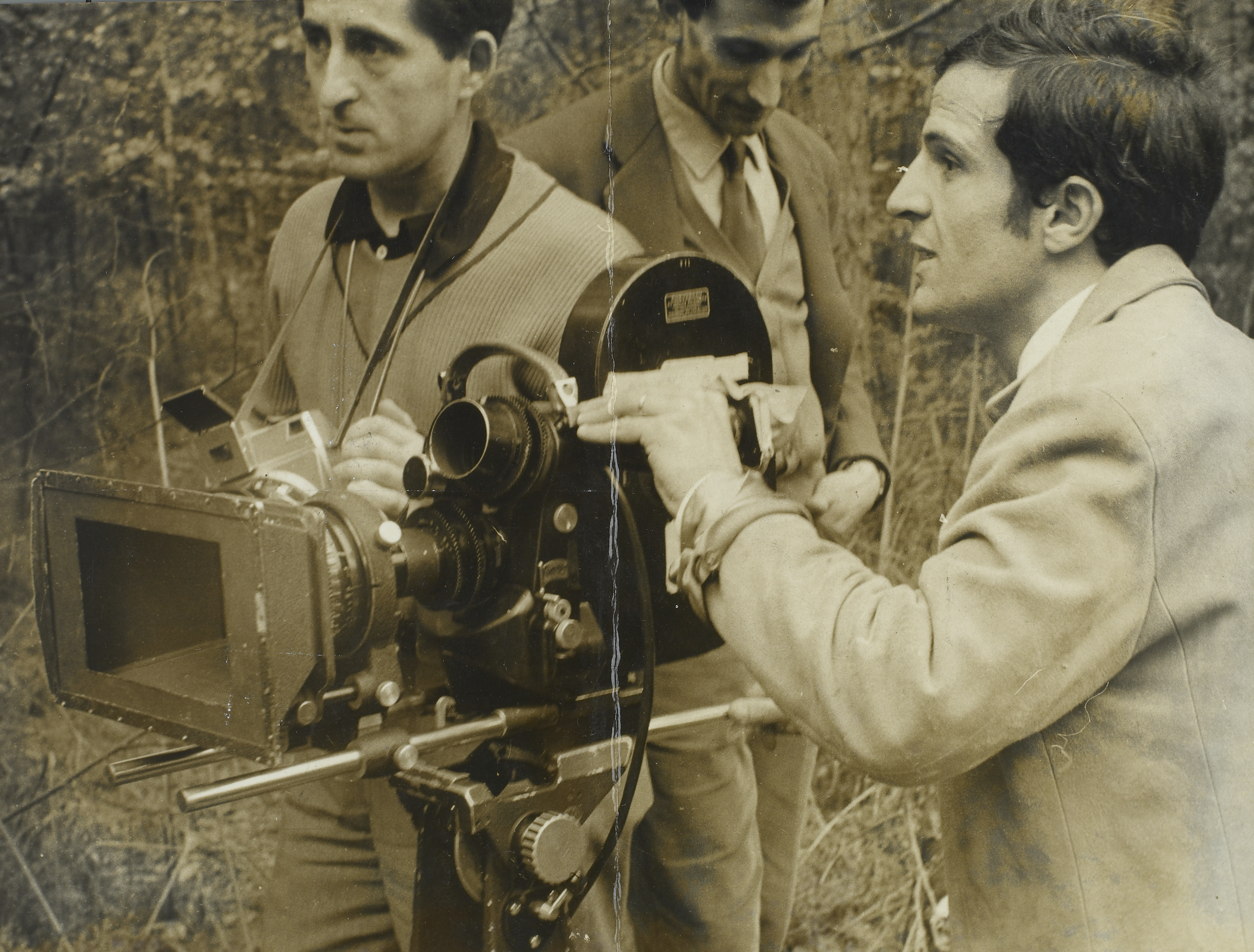
French filmmakers such as Francois Truffaut (far right) have been cited as emotionally giving audiences a heightened sense of intimacy during their movies' scenes, with this psychological tone being there throughout a multitude of artworks.

In literature, the tone of a literary work expresses the writer's attitude toward or feelings about the subject matter and audience.

The concept of a work's tone has been argued in the academic context as involving a critique of one's innate emotions: the creator or creators of an artistic piece deliberately push one to rethink the emotional dimensions of one's own life due to the creator or creator's psychological intent, which whoever comes across the piece must then deal with.

As the nature of commercial media and other such artistic expressions have evolved over time, the concept of an artwork's tone requiring analysis has been applied to other actions such as film production. For example, an evaluation of the "French New Wave" occurred during the spring of 1974 in the pages of Film Quarterly, which had studied particular directors such as Jean-Luc Godard and François Truffaut. The journal noted "the passionate concern for the status of... emotional life" that "pervades the films" they'd made. Highlighting those creative figures, Film Quarterly reported that the career path of such a filmmaker "treats intimacy, and its opposite, distance, in a unique way" that "focuses on the dialectic between" those contrasts as "they conjugate each other", and so the directors' social movement "uses intimacy as the dominant feeling-tone of its films" (emphasis added) thus.

== Overview of related ideas ==
Depending upon the personality of the writer and the effect that said individual aims to create, the work released by the writer can be formal or informal, sober or whimsical, assertive or pleading, and straightforward or sly, with the person's specific intents varying. In determining the attitude, mood, or tone of an author, one could examine the specific diction used.

When one writes, images and descriptive phrases can transmit emotions across—guarded optimism, unqualified enthusiasm, objective indifference, resignation, or dissatisfaction. Some other examples of literary tone are: airy, comic, condescending, facetious, funny, heavy, intimate, ironic, light, modest, playful, sad, serious, sinister, solemn, somber, and threatening.

== Tone as an intellectual concept ==
Evaluating the tones of certain works as a matter of intellectual study has been argued in the academic context as involving a critique of one's innate emotions: the creator or creators of an artistic piece deliberately push one to rethink the emotional dimensions of one's own life due to the creator or creator's psychological intent, which whoever comes across the piece must then deal with.

As the nature of commercial media and other such artistic expressions have evolved over time, the concept of an artwork's tone requiring analysis has involved cultural efforts such as film production. For example, an evaluation of the "French New Wave" occurred during the spring of 1974 in the pages of Film Quarterly, which had commented upon particular directors such as Jean-Luc Godard and Francois Truffaut. The journal noted "the passionate concern for the status of... emotional life" that "pervades the films" they'd made. Highlighting those creative figures, Film Quarterly reported that the career path of such a filmmaker "treats intimacy, and its opposite, distance, in a unique way" that "focuses on the dialectic between" those contrasts as "they conjugate each other", and so the directors' social movement "uses intimacy as the dominant feeling-tone of its films" (emphasis added) thus.

== Difference from mood ==
Tone and mood are not the same, although they are frequently confused. The mood of a piece of literature is the feeling or atmosphere created by the work, or, said slightly differently, how the work makes the reader feel. Mood is produced most effectively through the use of setting, theme, voice and tone, while tone is how the author feels about something.

== Usage ==
All pieces of literature, which includes even official documents and media of a technical nature, have some sort of tone. Authors create tone through the use of various other literary elements, such as diction or word choice; syntax, the grammatical arrangement of words in a text for effect; imagery, or vivid appeals to the senses; details, facts that are included or omitted; and figurative language, the comparison of seemingly unrelated things for sub-textual purposes.

While now used to discuss literature, the term tone was originally applied solely to music. This appropriated word has come to represent attitudes and feelings a speaker (in poetry), a narrator (in fiction), or an author (in non-literary prose) has towards the subject, situation, and/or the intended audience. The speaker or narrator should not be confused with the author, and attitudes and feelings of the speaker or narrator should not be confused with those of the author. In general, the tone of a piece only refers to attitude of the author if writing is non-literary in nature.

In many cases, the tone of a work may change and even clearly shift in a fundamental way as the speaker being described in a detached fashion (or the narrator being listened to) has his or her perspective on a particular subject evolve throughout the piece. For example, novels with a horror theme can have previously calm, uninvolved individuals coming upon an extreme situation, such as violence involving the supernatural, growing more and more passionate in a way that turns the entire writing increasingly emotional.

Official and technical documentation tends to employ a formal tone throughout the piece.

== Setting tone ==
Authors set a tone in literature by conveying emotions/feelings through words. The way a person feels about an idea/concept, event, or another person can be quickly determined through facial expressions, gestures and in the tone of voice used. In literature an author sets the tone through word choice that create imagery, perspective, tone, subject matter, and more. The possible tones are bounded only by the number of possible emotions a human being can have.

Diction and syntax often help convey the author's (or character's) attitude toward his subject. An example: "Charlie surveyed the classroom but it was really his mother congratulating himself for snatching the higher test grade, the smug smirk on his face growing brighter and brighter as he confirmed the inferiority of his peers." The tone here is one of arrogance; the quip "inferiority of his peers" shows Charlie's belief in his own prowess. The words "surveyed" and "congratulating himself" show Charlie as seeing himself better than the rest of his class. The diction, including the word "snatching", gives the reader a mental picture of someone quickly and effortlessly grabbing something, which proves once again Charlie's pride in himself. The "smug smirk" provides a facial imagery of Charlie's pride.

== See also ==
- Argumentation
- Grammatical voice
- Imagery
- Motif (narrative)
- Point of view (literature)
- Valence (psychology)
- Writer's voice
