= Referential density =

Literary concept proposed by Thomas G. Pavel

Referential density is a concept of ficto-narrative theory put forward by Thomas G. Pavel in his 1986 book, Fictional Worlds. The concept refers to the referential relationship of a text to a fictional world, the ontology of which can be established by a possible worlds approach. A large text that refers to a small fictional world is said to have low referential density, whereas a small text referring to a large fictional world has high referential density. The size of the text is measured in abstract terms as amplitude, which in most cases will correspond to its physical length; exceptions to this may arise in cases of embedded discourses, such as metanarratives (or imaging digressions), which refer to the actual world. For this reason, the form and genre of a fictional work provide only an approximate indication of its size; by the same token, it is possible to refer to the size and referential density of part of a fictional work. The size of a fictional world, in turn, is measured in terms of the sum total of properties applicable to the objects and agents inhabiting the fictional world.

== Relative density ==
Relative (referential) density builds upon the abstract definition of referential density by including context sensitive factors such as the degree of external information the reader has to import to his reconstruction of the fictional world, the text's narrative crowding, the ratio between action and description, and the epistemic paths chosen by the text. These factors will usually have more impact on the number of references in a text than its amplitude.

== Significance ==
Referential density and relative (referential) density account for much of what makes fictional texts 'thick' or 'easy' reads. All other factors being equal, high density will make for difficult reading in that the reader is required to reconstruct the fictional world in a short space, whereas low density is characteristic of a high degree of action. An author may, however, focus on psychology and thereby have a static plot with low density. On the other hand, certain authors and genres make the reader's reconstruction of the fictional world the very point of the text's enjoyment, which is the case with most works of science-fiction, fantasy, and historical fiction.
