= Title drop =

Line of dialogue in media containing the work's title

A title drop, also known as a titular line, is a line in a film, television series, book, or other media, that contains the title of the work. Though present in other forms of media, the term title drop typically refers to films. In some instances, the title drop occurs at a movie's end, such as in Iron Man and The Breakfast Club, where the final lines heard in the films are “I am Iron Man” and “Sincerely yours, the Breakfast Club” respectively. Title drops are not to be confused with title sequences, however, in which the title is shown through on-screen text, rather than being said directly. For instance, the Star Wars opening crawl would not be considered a title drop, but rather a title sequence as it is not spoken dialogue. Title drops have been around almost as long as movies themselves with some examples leading back to 1911. Since then, the use of the title drop has, overall, trended upward. The reception of title drops is greatly varied, with some considered iconic, others cringeworthy, and others altogether out-of-place. In studying title drops, it is important to consider the various types, the notable uses in film, as well as appearances in other media.

== First occurrence in film ==
Title drops have been around for almost as long as movies themselves. Though the exact first title drop has not been definitively found, Karadjordje, released in 1911, is an example of a very early title drop in a motion picture. This movie is a biopic centering around the character of Karadjordje and, thus, his name is said several times in the form of an intertitle.

== Variations ==
Self-aware title drops occur when a character drops the title of the movie directly and is aware that they are saying it. An example of this type occurs in the comedy movie Hot Tub Time Machine when a character states the entire title of the movie while staring into the camera and pausing. Back to the Future uses this form of self-aware title drop as well.

Promotive title drops occur when a character or characters say the name of the media they are in multiple times as a means of self-promotion. This type of title drop is typically seen in lower-budget media.

Titular character title drops happen when a movie is named after the main character, like Batman, Superman, Iron Man, etc. The title of the movie will likely be dropped multiple times since the character’s name is itself the title of the film. In this case, title drops lose emphasis since they end up being said many times instead of only being said once or twice. The 2023 film Barbie set the record for the most title drops in a single movie, with the title spoken 267 times.

Unaware title drops occur when the character, who is saying the title of the movie they are in, is completely unaware that they are doing so. This is common in more dramatic movies and is presented without breaking the fourth wall. This type is a more immersive form of title drop. An example of this type is found in the movie Eternal Sunshine of the Spotless Mind.

== Notable examples through history ==
Title drops have been on an upward trend every decade since 1960. Here is a list of some notable, influential, and iconic title drops throughout history.

=== 1940s ===
- Casablanca, the name of the movie, is also the name of the location the movie takes place in, causing these references to have less emphasis.
- Double Indemnity is the second highest-rated 1940s movie with title drops, having only three.

=== 1950s ===
- Singin’ in the Rain contains eleven title drops all coming in the form of the title song, Singin' in the Rain.
- Vertigo has one title drop towards the start of the movie when a character mentions that he has vertigo, a medical condition.

=== 1960s ===
Both Harakiri and The Apartment are named after words that are used in normal vocabulary (within the context of the time and place) and therefore both contain many title drops through the form of normal character conversation.

=== 1970s ===
- Unlike The Godfather, which contains fourteen total title drops, The Godfather Part II only contains four.

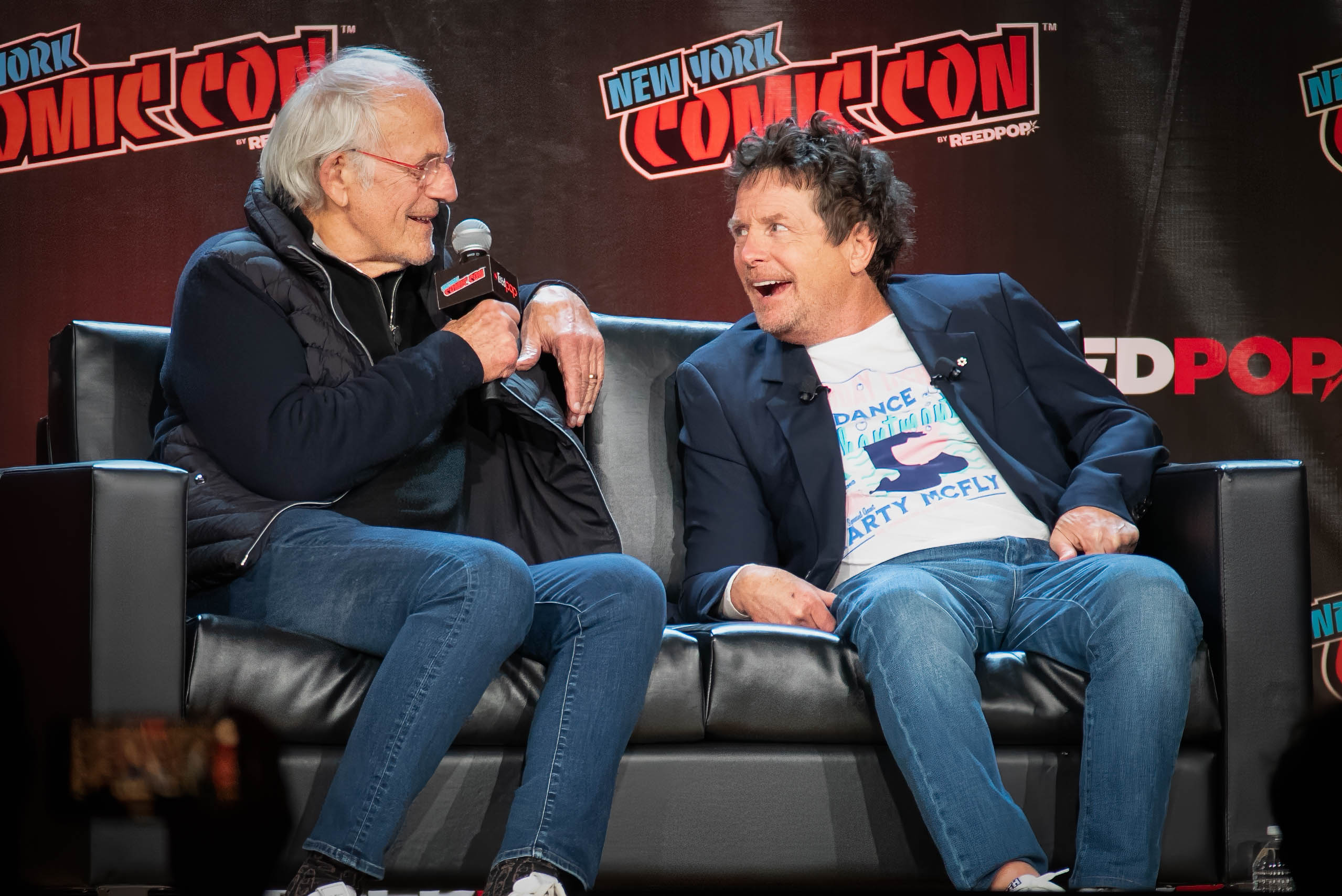
Christopher Lloyd and Michael J. Fox at the New York Comic Con (October 8, 2022). Photo by Chris Roth.

=== 1980s ===
- Back to the Future is likely the most famous example from this decade, with the ever-memorable line, “Next Saturday night, we’re sending you back to the future."
- The Shining contains two title drops, coming in the scene where one of the characters explains what “shining” is to another.

=== 1990s ===
- Goodfellas contains two title drops. While the title seems to be a term that might be commonly used among the main characters of this film, the term is actually not used until the very end.
- Fight Club contains twenty-five casual title drops. Rather than seeming like actual title drops, it is more like the characters are casually mentioning the fight club they are a part of.

=== 2000s ===
- The three Lord of the Rings movies contain one title drop each.
- The Dark Knight contains one title drop, which is the final line of the movie.

=== 2010s ===
- Interstellar contains one title drop, found in the middle.
- Suicide Squad is notable for having its title drop seem forced. This led to many snowclone memes imitating it.

=== 2020s ===
- Spider-Man: Across the Spider-Verse contains forty-four uses of Spider-Man’s name throughout the movie. Every single one of these title drops is in the form of the character's name being mentioned.
- Barbie, as mentioned above, sets the record for most title drops in a single movie with 267 occurrences. This is due to the fact that the movie is not only named after a single character but that there are a large number of characters named Barbie.
- in A Minecraft Movie, Steve says “first we mine, then we craft. Let’s Minecraft!”

== In other media ==
Although the term title drop typically refers to film, here are some notable examples from other media types.

First-edition cover of To Kill a Mockingbird (1960) by the American author Harper Lee.

At one point in the book To Kill a Mockingbird, the character Atticus explains to Jem that he can, “Shoot all the bluejays you want, if you can hit ‘em, but remember it's a sin to kill a mockingbird”

In the book A Brave New World, at one point the narrator speaks, “‘O brave new world,’ he began, then suddenly interrupted himself; the blood had left his cheeks; he was pale as paper”.

Fahrenheit 451 contains a partial title drop in the line, “They pumped the cold fluid from the numeraled 451 tanks strapped to their shoulders”.

Title drops in music are extremely common, considering many songs are simply named after a lyric they contain. The song “Pray” by MC Hammer holds the world record for the most title drops in a US top 40 hit.

In the TV show Better Call Saul, the title is dropped in an impactful moment in the final episode of the show.

In the TV show Invincible, the title is dropped at the beginning of its episodes, however, before the word is spoken it is replaced by the show's title card.

Similarly to Invincible, in the TV show Among Us, in the first episode, a character speaks "We're so happy to have you amongst us! Or is it among us? I always forget which one is grammatically-" before being cut off by the show's title card.
