= Kenneth Tobey =

American actor (1917–2002)

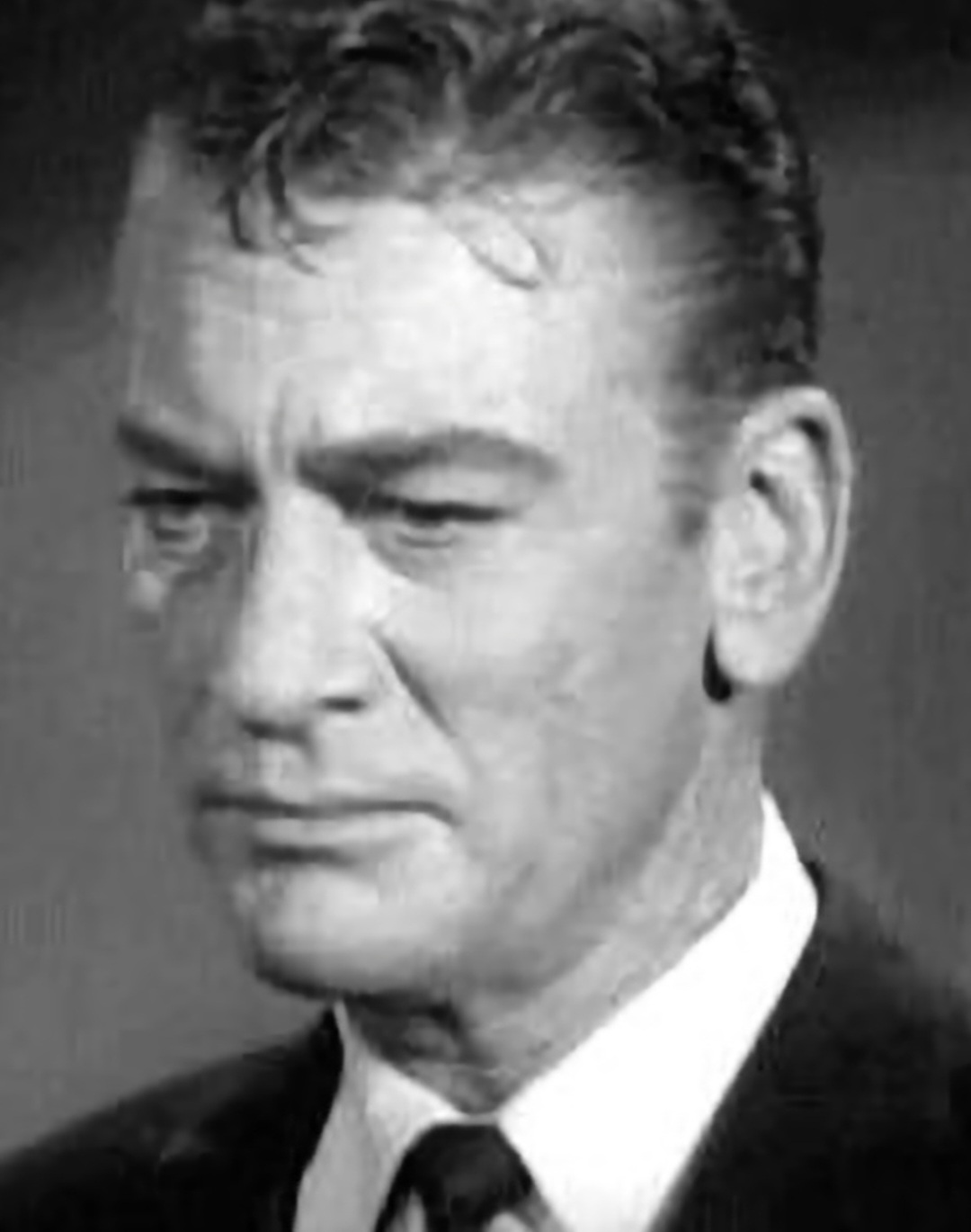
- Tobey in Stark Fear (1962)
- Born: Jesse Kenneth Tobey; March 23, 1917; Oakland, California, U.S.
- Died: December 22, 2002 (aged 85); Rancho Mirage, California, U.S.
- Occupation: Actor
- Years active: 1943–1997
- Spouse: June Hutton (m. 1968; died 1973)
- Children: 1

Jesse Kenneth Tobey (March 23, 1917 – December 22, 2002) was an American actor active from the early 1940s into the 1990s, with over 200 credits in film, theatre, and television. He is best known for his role as a captain who takes charge of an Arctic military base when it is attacked by a plant-based alien in the sci-fi horror classic The Thing from Another World (1951), a role which earned him a Photoplay Award nomination, and a starring role in the 1957-1960 Desilu Productions TV series Whirlybirds.

== Early life ==
Tobey was born in 1917 in Oakland, California. Following his graduation from high school in 1935, he entered the University of California, Berkeley, with intentions to pursue a career in law, until he began to dabble in acting at the school's theater. His stage experience there led to a drama scholarship, a year-and-a-half of study at New York City's Neighborhood Playhouse, where his classmates included fellow actors Gregory Peck, Eli Wallach, and Tony Randall.

During World War II, Tobey joined the United States Army Air Forces, serving in the Pacific as a rear gunner aboard a B-25 bomber.

== Career ==
Throughout the 1940s, with the exception of his time in military service, Tobey acted on Broadway and in summer stock.

=== Film ===
After appearing in a 1943 film short, The Man of the Ferry, he made his Hollywood film debut in the 1947 Hopalong Cassidy Western Dangerous Venture. He then went on to appear in scores of features and on numerous television series. In the 1949 film Twelve O' Clock High, he is the negligent airbase sentry who is dressed down by General Frank Savage (played by Gregory Peck). That same year, Tobey performed in a brief comedy bit in another film, I Was a Male War Bride starring Cary Grant. His performance in that minor part caught the attention of director Howard Hawks, who promised to use the 32-year-old actor in something more substantial.

In 1951, Tobey was cast in Howard Hawks' production The Thing from Another World. In this classic sci-fi film he portrays Captain Patrick Hendry, a United States Air Force pilot, who at the North Pole leads a scientific outpost's dogged defense against an alien portrayed by James Arness, later the star of the television series Gunsmoke. Tobey's performance in Hawks' film garnered the actor other parts in science-fiction movies in the 1950s, usually reprising his role as a military officer, such as in The Beast from 20,000 Fathoms (1953) and It Came from Beneath the Sea (1955).

In 1957, Tobey portrayed a sheriff in The Vampire (a film that some sources today often confuse with the 1935 production Mark of the Vampire). That year, he also appeared in a more prestigious film, serving as a featured supporting character with John Wayne and Maureen O'Hara, the co-stars of John Ford's The Wings of Eagles. In that film, Tobey, with his naturally red hair on display in vibrant Metrocolor, portrays a highly competitive United States Army Air Service officer. In one memorable scene, he has the distinction of shoving a piece of gooey cake into John Wayne's face, whose character is a rival United States Navy aviation officer. Not surprisingly, a room-wrecking brawl ensues.

Tobey's work over the next several decades was increasingly involved in television productions. He did, though, continue to perform in a range of feature films, such as Stark Fear, Marlowe starring James Garner as Raymond Chandler's detective Philip Marlowe, Billy Jack starring Tom Laughlin, Walking Tall starring Joe Don Baker, The Howling, the war movie MacArthur (in which he portrays Admiral William F. "Bull" Halsey), Airplane!, Gremlins, Big Top Pee-wee starring Paul Reubens, and Gremlins 2: The New Batch.

=== Television ===
Tobey appeared in the 1952 episode "Counterfeit Plates" on the CBS series Biff Baker, U.S.A., an espionage drama starring Alan Hale Jr. He portrayed a plainclothes policeman in a 1953 episode of the anthology series Schlitz Playhouse of the Stars starring Angela Lansbury and Morris Ankrum, including a lengthy fistfight between Tobey's and Ankrum's characters. He was cast in the 1954-1955 CBS legal drama Public Defender starring Reed Hadley. He guest-starred in three episodes of NBC's Western anthology series Frontier. His Frontier roles were as Wade Trippe in "In Nebraska" (1955) and then as Gabe Sharp in "Out from Texas" and "The Hostage" (1956). In 1955, he also portrayed legendary frontiersman Jim Bowie on ABC's Davy Crockett, a Walt Disney production, with Fess Parker in the title role. After Bowie's death in the series at the Battle of the Alamo, Tobey played a second character, Jocko, in the two final episodes of Davy Crockett.

Tobey then, in 1957, appeared in the syndicated religion anthology series Crossroads in the role of Mr. Alston in the episode "Call for Help", and as Jim Callahan in "Bandit Chief" in the syndicated Western series The Sheriff of Cochise. Later that same year, Tobey starred in the television series Whirlybirds, a successful CBS and then-syndicated adventure produced by Desilu Studios. In it, he played the co-owner of a helicopter charter service, along with Craig Hill. Whirlybirds was a major hit in the United States and abroad, with 111 episodes filmed through 1960. It remained in syndication worldwide for many years.

In 1958, Tobey also appeared as John Wallach in the episode "$50 for a Dead Man" in Jeff Richards's NBC Western series Jefferson Drum. In 1960, he guest-starred in the episode "West of Boston" of another NBC Western series, Overland Trail, starring William Bendix and Doug McClure. Also in 1960, he appeared as Colonel Lake on Death Valley Days and on ABC's Western The Rebel, starring Nick Adams. Tobey made three guest appearances on Perry Mason, twice in 1960 and once in 1962 as Jack Alvin, a deputy district attorney. On the long-running CBS Western series Gunsmoke, he portrayed a cruel, knife-wielding buffalo hunter in the 1960 episode titled "The Worm". Tobey in 1962 also guest-starred on another Western series, Lawman, playing the character Duncan Clooney, an engineer who seeks to move a shipment of nitroglycerin through Laramie, Wyoming. When the town is evacuated to allow passage of the explosives, two of Clooney's employees decide they will take advantage of the situation to rob the bank.

Tobey also guest-starred in Jack Lord's 1962-1963 ABC adventure series about a rodeo circuit rider, Stoney Burke. In 1967, he performed on the series Lassie, in the episode "Lure of the Wild", playing a retired forest ranger who tames a local coyote. He also appeared as a slave owner named Taggart in "The Wolf Man", a 1967 episode of Daniel Boone, starring Fess Parker. In 1974 he guest starred as bomb squad Sgt. Reardon in the episode "Downtime" of the TV series Chopper One, a brief return to a helicopter-based action show almost two decades after Whirlybirds. A few of the many other series in which Tobey later performed include Adam-12 (1969), S.W.A.T. (1975) as a desk sergeant who disapproves of Officer Luca's disheveled looks, Gibbsville (1976), MV Klickitat (1978), Emergency! (1975), and Night Court (1985).

He became a semiregular on the NBC drama series I Spy as the field boss of agents Robinson and Scott, played by Robert Culp and comedian Bill Cosby. Christian Nyby, director of The Thing From Another World, often directed those episodes. Tobey also portrayed a ship's captain on the Rockford Files starring James Garner in an episode titled "There's One in Every Port".

=== Theatre ===
Although Tobey had a busy acting career in films and on television, he also periodically returned to the stage. In 1964, he began a long run on Broadway opposite Sammy Davis Jr., in the musical version of Clifford Odets' play Golden Boy. Some of his other Broadway credits are As You Like It, Sunny River, Janie, Sons and Soldiers, A New Life, Suds in Your Eye, The Cherry Orchard, and Truckline Cafe.

=== Later work ===
As his long career drew to a close, Tobey still received acting jobs from people who had grown up watching his performances in sci-fi films of the 1950s, particularly Joe Dante, who included the veteran actor in his stock company of reliable players. Two appearances on the sitcom Night Court came the same way, through fans of his work. Along with other character actors who had been in 1950s sci-fi and horror films (John Agar, Robert O. Cornthwaite, Gloria Talbott, etc.), Tobey starred in a spoof originally titled Attack of the B Movie Monster. In 2005, Anthem Pictures released the completed feature version of this spoof on DVD under the new title The Naked Monster. Tobey's scenes in that release were actually shot in 1985, so The Naked Monster is technically his final film credit, being released three years after his death. He had, however, continued to act throughout most of the 1990s. One of those notable roles is his performance in the 1994 Star Trek: Deep Space Nine episode "Shadowplay" as Rurigan, an alien who recreates his dead friends as holograms. Among other examples of Tobey's final decade of work are his two appearances as Judge Kent Watson on the series L.A. Law.

== Personal life and death ==
In 1968, Tobey married June Hutton.

Tobey was an active member of the Republican party in southern California. He campaigned for Eisenhower in the 1952 presidential election and again in 1956. He said he voted for Richard Nixon in 1960, Barry Goldwater in 1964 and Richard Nixon again in 1968. Many of his close friends, including John Charles Moffitt, Lela Rogers, Robert Montgomery and Ronald Reagan, were "friendly witnesses" for HUAC during the days of the Hollywood blacklist.

Tobey died at age 85 on December 22, 2002, at the Eisenhower Memorial Hospital in Rancho Mirage, California, after an unspecified but extended illness. His remains were cremated by the Neptune Society, and his ashes taken by his daughter Tina.

== Partial filmography ==
- The Man of the Ferry (1943, short)
- Dangerous Venture (1947) – Red
- This Time for Keeps (1948) – Redheaded Soldier at Pool (uncredited)
- Beyond Glory (1948) – Bit Role (uncredited)
- He Walked by Night (1948) – Detective Questioning Pete (uncredited)
- The Stratton Story (1949) – Detroit Player (uncredited)
- Illegal Entry (1949) – Dave (uncredited)
- The Great Sinner (1949) – Cabbie (uncredited)
- I Was a Male War Bride (1949) – Red, Seaman (uncredited)
- The Stratton Story (1949)
- Task Force (1949) – Captain Ken Williamson (uncredited)
- The Doctor and the Girl (1949) – Surgeon at Bellevue (uncredited)
- Free for All (1949) – Pilot
- Twelve O'Clock High (1949) – Sergeant Keller, Guard at Gate (uncredited)
- The File on Thelma Jordon (1950) – Police Photographer (uncredited)
- When Willie Comes Marching Home (1950) – Lieutenant K. Geiger (uncredited)
- One Way Street (1950) – Cop at Second Accident (uncredited)
- Love That Brute (1950) – Henchman #1 in Cigar Store (uncredited)
- The Gunfighter (1950) – Swede (uncredited)
- My Friend Irma Goes West (1950) – Pilot
- Kiss Tomorrow Goodbye (1950) – Detective Fowler
- Right Cross (1950) – Ken, the Third Reporter
- Three Secrets (1950) – Officer (uncredited)
- The Flying Missile (1950) – Crewman Pete McEvoy
- The Company She Keeps (1951) – Rex Fisher (uncredited)
- Up Front (1951) – Cooper (uncredited)
- Rawhide (1951) – Lieutenant Wingate (uncredited)
- The Thing from Another World (1951) – Captain Patrick Hendry
- Angel Face (1952) – Bill Crompton
- The Beast from 20,000 Fathoms (1953) – Colonel Jack Evans
- Fighter Attack (1953) – George
- The Bigamist (1953) – Tom Morgan, Defense Attorney
- Ring of Fear (1954) – Shreveport
- Down Three Dark Streets (1954) – FBI Agent Zack Stewart
- The Steel Cage (1954) – Steinberg, Convict Painter (segment "The Face")
- Davy Crockett, King of the Wild Frontier (1955) – Colonel Jim Bowie
- Rage at Dawn (1955) – Monk Claxton
- It Came from Beneath the Sea (1955) – Commander Pete Mathews
- Davy Crockett and the River Pirates (1956) – Jocko
- The Steel Jungle (1956) – Dr. Lewy
- The Man in the Grey Flannel Suit (1956) – Lieutenant Hank Mahoney (uncredited)
- The Great Locomotive Chase (1956) – Anthony Murphy
- The Search for Bridey Murphy (1956) – Rex Simmons
- The Wings of Eagles (1957) – Captain Herbert Allen Hazard
- Gunfight at the O.K. Corral (1957) – Bat Masterson
- The Vampire (1957) – Sheriff Buck Donnelly
- Jet Pilot (1957) – Sergeant (uncredited)
- Cry Terror! (1958) – Agent Frank Cole (uncredited)
- Alfred Hitchcock Presents (1959) (Season 5 Episode 13: "An Occurrence at Owl Creek Bridge") – Jeff, Confederate Colonel
- Bat Masterson (1960) – Reed Amherst (diamond con man)
- Seven Ways from Sundown (1960) – Texas Ranger Lieutenant Herly
- Perry Mason (1960) – Deputy District Attorney Jack Alvin – Season 4, Episode 3: "The Ill Fated Faker"
- X-15 (1961) – Colonel Craig Brewster
- Sea Hunt (1961) (Season 4 Episode 33) - Pete Butler
- Stark Fear (1962) – Cliff Kane
- 40 Guns to Apache Pass (1966) – Corporal Bodine
- A Man Called Adam (1966) – Club Owner
- A Time for Killing (1967) – Sergeant Cleehan
- Marlowe (1969) – Sergeant Fred Beifus
- Billy Jack (1971) – Deputy Mike
- Terror in the Sky (1971) – Captain Wilson
- Ben (1972) – Engineer
- The Candidate (1972) – Floyd J. Starkey
- Rage (1972) – Colonel Alan A. Nickerson
- Bunco Boys and How To Beat Them (1973, short) - Lieutenant Cortney
- Walking Tall (1973) – Augie McCullah
- Dirty Mary, Crazy Larry (1974) – Sheriff Carl Donahue
- Homebodies (1974) – Construction Boss
- The Missiles of October (1974) – Admiral George W. Anderson Jr., Chief of Naval Operations
- The Wild McCullochs (1975) – Larry Carpenter
- W.C. Fields and Me (1976) – Parker
- Baby Blue Marine (1976) – Buick Driver
- Gus (1976) – Assistant Warden
- MacArthur (1977) – Admiral William F. Halsey
- Goodbye, Franklin High (1978) – Police Captain
- Hero at Large (1980) – Firechief
- Airplane! (1980) – Air Controller Neubauer
- The Howling (1981) – Older Cop
- Strange Invaders (1983) – Arthur Newman
- Gremlins (1984) – Mobil Gas Station Attendant (uncredited)
- The Lost Empire (1984) – Captain Hendry
- Innerspace (1987) – Man in Restroom
- Big Top Pee-wee (1988) – Sheriff
- Freeway (1988) – Monsignor Kavanaugh
- Ghost Writer (1989) – Cop #2
- Gremlins 2: The New Batch (1990) – Projectionist
- Desire and Hell at Sunset Motel (1991) – Captain Holiday
- Honey, I Blew Up the Kid (1992) – Smitty
- Single White Female (1992) – Desk Clerk
- Body Shot (1994) – Arthur Lassen
- Hellraiser: Bloodline (1996) – Hologram-Priest (uncredited)
- The Naked Monster (2005) – Colonel Patrick Hendry (final film role)
