= List of narrative techniques =

List of methods used to convey information in a narrative

A narrative technique or narrative device (also, in fiction, a fictional device) is any literary device that the creator of a story uses in storytelling, thus effectively relaying information to the audience or making the story more complete, complex, or engaging. Some scholars also call such a technique a narrative mode, though this term can also more narrowly refer to the particular technique of using a commentary to deliver a story. Narrative techniques are distinguished from narrative elements, which exist inherently in all works of narrative, rather than being merely optional strategies.

== Setting ==
Name	Definition	Example
Setting as a form of symbolism or allegory	The setting is both the time and geographic location within a narrative or within a work of fiction; sometimes, storytellers use the setting as a way to represent deeper ideas, reflect characters' emotions, or encourage the audience to make certain connections that add complexity to how the story may be interpreted.	The novel Ulysses by James Joyce is set in Dublin, Ireland, over the course of a single day, 16 June 1904. The novel spans from Sandycove in the South to Howth Head in the North, with detailed descriptions of Dublin locations that parallel those in Homer's Odyssey. Leopold Bloom's home at 7 Eccles Street serves as a modern-day Ithaca, while other landmarks represent various episodes of the Odyssey. In Tayeb Salih's Season of Migration to the North (1966), the narrative alternates between an unnamed village on the Nile and London, England. This dual setting frames Mustafa Sa'eed's movement between home and the former imperial center. It shows how place shapes his relationships and sense of self while the novel examines the continuing effects of colonialism.

== Plot ==
Name	Definition	Example
Backstory	Story that precedes events in the story being told—past events or background that add meaning to current circumstances.	Though The Lord of the Rings trilogy takes place in a relatively short period towards the end of the 3021-year Third Age, the narration gives glimpses of the mythological and historical events which took place earlier in the Third Age leading up to the action in the novel, and in the First and Second Age.
Chekhov's gun	A dramatic principle that requires every element in a narrative to be substantive, with anything redundant or arbitrary removed.	"Remove everything that has no relevance to the story. If you say in the first chapter that there is a rifle hanging on the wall, in the second or third chapter it absolutely must go off. If it's not going to be fired, it shouldn't be hanging there." — Anton Chekhov.
Cliffhanger	The narrative ends unresolved, to draw the audience back to a future episode for the resolution.	Almost every episode of TV shows like Dexter and Breaking Bad ends with one of the characters in a predicament (about to be caught by thugs, about to be exposed by the authorities, or a family member or a friend finds out the main character's dirty secret).
Eucatastrophe	Coined by J. R. R. Tolkien, a climactic event through which the protagonist appears to be facing a catastrophic change. However, this change does not materialize and the protagonist finds themself benefiting from the climactic event; contrast peripety/peripeteia.	At the end of The Lord of the Rings, Gollum forcibly takes away the Ring from Frodo, suggesting that Sauron would eventually take over Middle Earth. However, Gollum celebrates too eagerly and clumsily falls into the lava, whereby the ring is destroyed and with it Sauron's power. In a way, Gollum does what Frodo and the Fellowship of the Ring intended to do through the whole plot of the trilogy, which was to throw the ring into the lake of fire in the heart of Mount Doom.
Flashback (or analepsis)	Alteration of time sequences, taking characters back to the beginning of the tale, for instance.	The story of "The Three Apples" in the Arabian Nights tales begins with the discovery of a young woman's dead body. After the murderer later reveals himself, he narrates his reasons for the murder as a flashback of events leading up to the discovery of her dead body at the beginning of the story.
Flashforward (or prolepsis)	A scene that temporarily jumps the narrative forward in time. A flashforward often represents events expected, projected, or imagined to occur in the future. They may also reveal significant parts of the story that have not yet occurred, but soon will in greater detail.	Occurs in A Christmas Carol when Mr. Scrooge visits the ghost of the future. It is also frequent in the later seasons of the television series Lost.
Foreshadowing	Implicit yet intentional efforts of an author to suggest events that have yet to take place in the process of narration. See also repetitive designation and Chekhov's gun.	A narration might begin with a male character who has to break up a schoolyard fight among some boys who are vying for the attention of a girl, which was introduced to foreshadow the events leading to a dinner time squabble between the character and his twin brother over a woman, whom both are courting at the same time.
Frame story	A story which occupies a small part of the total narrative, such that one or more other stories are recounted within the frame story. Contrast story within a story.	With multiple internal stories: early examples include Panchatantra, Kalila and Dimna, Arabian Nights, and The Decameron. More modern examples are Brian Jacques's 1999 The Legend of Luke, Ramsay Wood's 2011 Kalila and Dimna update, subtitled Fables of Conflict and Intrigue and Sophia de Mello Breyner Andresen's 1964 The Knight of Denmark (O cavaleiro da Dinamarca). With a single internal story: in Frankenstein, the frame story is narrated by an Arctic explorer, who is told the main story by Victor Frankenstein. In Wuthering Heights, the frame story is told by a visitor; the main story begins 30 years earlier and comprises transcripts of letters and journal entries he reads and accounts he hears from the protagonists.
In medias res	Beginning the story in the middle of a sequence of events. A specific form of narrative hook.	This is used in epic poems, for example, where it is a mandatory form to be adopted. Luís de Camões' The Lusiads or the Iliad and the Odyssey of Homer are prime examples. The latter work begins with the return of Odysseus to his home of Ithaca and then in flashbacks tells of his ten years of wandering following the Trojan War. The Lusiads starts in the middle of the sea voyage to India and contextualizes the beginning of said journey as well as Portugal's history when the master of the ship tells an African king about it.
Narrative hook	Story opening that "hooks" readers' attention so they will keep reading.	Many non-fiction books are introduced with an interesting factoid.
MacGuffin	Object required to initiate the plot or motivation of the characters, but having little significance by itself.	"Heart of the Ocean" necklace in James Cameron's 1997 Titanic, which essentially serves as an object to cause Rose to tell her story.
Ochi	A sudden interruption of the wordplay flow indicating the end of a rakugo or a kobanashi.	A Rakugo is a Japanese verbal entertainment usually lasting 30 minutes which ends with a surprise punch line, a narrative stunt known as ochi (fall) or sage (lowering). Twelve kinds of ochi are codified and recognized. The earlier kobanashi was a short comical vignette ending with an ochi.
Plot twist	Unexpected change ("twist") in the direction or expected outcome of the plot. See also twist ending.	An early example is the Arabian Nights tale "The Three Apples". A locked chest found by a fisherman contains a dead body, and two different men claim to be the murderer, which turns out to be the investigator's own slave.
Poetic justice	Virtue ultimately rewarded, or vice punished, by an ironic twist of fate related to the character's own conduct.	Wile E. Coyote coming up with a contraption to catch the Road Runner, only to be foiled and caught by his own devices. Each sin's punishment in Dante's Inferno is a symbolic instance of poetic justice.
Predestination paradox	Time travel paradox where a time traveler is caught in a loop of events that "predestines" them to travel back in time.	In Doctor Who, the main character repeatedly finds himself under the obligation of having to travel back in time because of something his future character has done.
Red herring	Diverting attention away from an item of significance.	For example, in mystery fiction, an innocent party may be purposefully cast as highly suspicious through emphasis or descriptive techniques to divert attention from the true guilty party.
Self-fulfilling prophecy	Prediction that, by being made, makes itself come true.	Early examples include the legend of Oedipus, and the story of Krishna in the Mahabharata. There is also an example of this in Harry Potter when Lord Voldemort heard a prophecy (made by Sybill Trelawney to Dumbledore) that a boy born at the end of July, whose parents had defied Voldemort thrice and survived, would be made marked as his equal. Because of this prophecy, Lord Voldemort sought out Harry Potter (believing him to be the boy spoken of) and tried to kill him. His parents died protecting him, and when Voldemort tried to cast a killing curse on Harry, it rebounded and took away most of his strength, and gave Harry Potter a unique ability and connection with the Dark Lord thus marking him as his equal.
Story within a story (Hypodiegesis)	A story told within another story. See also frame story.	In Stephen King's The Wind Through the Keyhole, of the Dark Tower series, the protagonist tells a story from his past to his companions, and in this story he tells another relatively unrelated story.
Ticking time bomb scenario	Threat of impending disaster—often used in thrillers where salvation and escape are essential elements.	In the post-apocalyptic novel On the Beach, the main characters face increasing radioactivity drifting across the equator toward Australia. Learning that the worst is predicted to come sooner rather than later heightens the urgency and sense of immediacy felt by the characters and by the reader.
Unreliable narrator	The narrator of the story is not sincere, or introduces a bias in their narration and possibly misleads the reader, hiding or minimizing events, characters, or motivations.	An example is The Murder of Roger Ackroyd. The novel includes an unexpected plot twist at the end of the novel. In the last chapter, Sheppard describes how he was an unreliable narrator.

== Perspective ==
Name	Definition	Example
Audience surrogate	A character who expresses the questions and confusion of the audience, with whom the audience can identify. Frequently used in detective fiction and science fiction, where the character asks a central character how they accomplished certain deeds, for the purpose of inciting that character to explain (for the curious audience) their methods, or a character asking a relatively educated person to explain what amounts to the backstory.	Dr. Watson in the Sherlock Holmes stories. Scott Evil, played by Seth Green, son of Dr. Evil in the Austin Powers films. The companion role in Doctor Who, usually a contemporary human, giving the alien Doctor someone to explain situations to, for the benefit of the audience. Dr. Jennifer Melfi in The Sopranos.
Author surrogate	Characters which are based on authors, usually to support their personal views. Sometimes an intentionally or unintentionally idealized version of them. A variation is the Mary Sue or Gary Stu, which primarily serves as an idealized self-insertion.	Socrates in the writings of Plato. Plato never speaks in his own voice in his dialogues. In the Second Letter, it says, "no writing of Plato exists or ever will exist, but those now said to be his are those of a Socrates become beautiful and new".
Breaking the fourth wall	An author or character addresses the audience directly (also known as direct address). This may acknowledge to the reader or audience that what is being presented is fiction, or may seek to extend the world of the story to provide the illusion that they are included in it.	The characters in Sesame Street often break the fourth wall when they address their viewers as part of the ongoing storyline, which is possible because of the high level of suspension of disbelief afforded by its audience—children. The English political drama show House of Cards and its later American version also use this technique frequently to let the viewers know what the main character Frank Underwood is thinking and planning. Ferris Bueller in Ferris Bueller's Day Off frequently addresses the audience. Mr. Wolf in The Bad Guys and its sequel occasionally talks to the audience.
Defamiliarization	Taking an everyday object and presenting it in a way that is weirdly unfamiliar so that we see the object in a new way. Coined by the early 20th-century Russian literary critic Viktor Shklovsky in "Art as Technique."	In Swift's Gulliver's Travels, when Gulliver visits the land of the giants and sees a giant woman's skin, he sees it as anything but smooth and beautiful when viewed up close. Another common method of defamiliarization is to "make strange" a story (fabula) by creating a deformed plot (syuzhet). Tristram Shandy is defamiliarized by Laurence Sterne's unfamiliar plotting, which causes the reader to pay attention to the story and see it in an unjaded way.
First-person narration	A text presented from the point of view of a character, especially the protagonist, as if the character is telling the story themselves. (Breaking the fourth wall is an option, but not a necessity, of this format.)	Mark Twain's Adventures of Huckleberry Finn uses the title character as the narrator, while Sherlock Holmes is primarily told from Watson's perspective. The film The Wolf of Wall Street uses this technique where the protagonist narrates the film's events throughout, providing clarity that could not be gained from the picture and dialogue alone.
Magical realism	Describing events in a real-world setting but with magical trappings, often incorporating local customs and invented beliefs. Different from urban fantasy in that the magic itself is not the focus of the story.	Particularly popular with Latin American authors like Gabriel García Márquez and Jorge Luis Borges. Elsewhere, Salman Rushdie's work provides good examples.
Multiperspectivity	A narrative that is told from the viewpoints of multiple characters that incorporate various perspectives, emotions, and views from witnesses or actors to varying particular events or circumstances that might not be felt by other characters in the story.	The films of Robert Altman. 2666 by Roberto Bolano features European literary critics, a Chilean philosophy professor, an African-American journalist, detectives investigating Santa Teresa murders and an obscure German writer named Benno Von Archimboldi. Pale Fire by Vladimir Nabokov features literature professor John Shade, Charles Kinbote, a neighbor and colleague of Shade's and Charles the Beloved, king of Zembla. Kinbote is the ultimate unreliable commentator.
Second-person narration	A text written in the style of a direct address, in the second-person.	Bright Lights, Big City by Jay McInerney.
Stream of consciousness	The author uses narrative and stylistic devices to create the sense of an unedited interior monologue, characterized by leaps in syntax and punctuation that trace a character's fragmentary thoughts and sensory feelings. The outcome is a highly lucid perspective with a plot. Not to be confused with free writing.	An example is Ulysses. At one point Leopold Bloom saunters through Dublin musing on "Pineapple rock, lemon platt, butter scotch. A sugar-sticky girl shovelling scoopful of creams for a Christian brother. Some school treat. Bad for their tummies."
Third-person narration	A text written as if by an impersonal narrator who is not affected by the events in the story. Can be omniscient or limited, the latter usually being tied to a specific character, a group of characters, or a location.	A Song of Ice and Fire is written in multiple limited third-person narrators that change with each chapter. The Master and Margarita uses an omniscient narrator.

== Style ==
Name	Definition	Example
Allegory	The expression, by means of symbolic fictional figures and actions, of truths or generalizations about human conduct or experience.	C. S. Lewis's The Lion, the Witch, and the Wardrobe is a religious allegory with Aslan as Christ and Edmund as Judas.
Alliteration	Repeating the same letter or consonant sound at the beginning of adjacent or closely connected words.	In the film V for Vendetta the main character performs a couple of soliloquies with a heavy use of alliteration, e.g., "Voilà! In view, a humble vaudevillian veteran, cast vicariously as both victim and villain by the vicissitudes of Fate. This visage, no mere veneer of vanity, is a vestige of the vox populi, now vacant, vanished, as the once vital voice of the verisimilitude now venerates what they once vilified. However, this valorous visitation of a bygone vexation stands vivified, and has vowed to vanquish these venal and virulent vermin vanguarding vice and vouchsafing the violently vicious and voracious violation of volition. The only verdict is vengeance; a vendetta held as a votive, not in vain, for the value and veracity of such shall one day vindicate the vigilant and the virtuous. Verily, this vichyssoise of verbiage veers most verbose vis-à-vis an introduction, and so it is my very good honor to meet you and you may call me V."
Amplification (rhetoric)	Amplification refers to a literary practice wherein the writer embellishes the sentence by adding more information to it in order to increase its worth and understanding.	E.g., Original sentence: The thesis paper was difficult. After amplification: The thesis paper was difficult: it required extensive research, data collection, sample surveys, interviews and a lot of fieldwork.
Anagram	Rearranging the letters of a word or a phrase to form a new phrase or word.	E.g., An anagram for "debit card" is "bad credit". As you can see, both phrases use the same letters. By mixing the letters a bit of humor is created.
Asyndeton	When sentences do not use conjunctions (e.g., and, or, nor) to separate clauses, but run clauses into one another, usually marking the separation of clauses with punctuation.	An example is when John F. Kennedy said on January 20, 1961: "...that we shall pay any price, bear any burden, meet any hardship, support any friend, oppose any foe to assure the survival and the success of liberty."
Bathos	An abrupt transition in style from the exalted to the commonplace, producing a ludicrous effect. While often unintended, bathos may be used deliberately to produce a humorous effect.	The ballerina rose gracefully en pointe and extended one slender leg behind her, like a dog at a fire hydrant.
Caesura	A break, especially a sense pause, usually near the middle of a verse, and marked in scansion by a double vertical line. This technique frequently occurs within a poetic line grammatically connected to the end of the previous line by enjambment.	E.g., in "Know then thyself. ‖ Presume not God to scan" (from An Essay on Man by Alexander Pope).
Distancing effect	Deliberately preventing the audience from identifying with characters in order to let them be coolly scrutinized.	Popularized by 20th century playwright Bertolt Brecht.
Dramatic visualization	Representing an object or character with abundant descriptive detail, or mimetically rendering gestures and dialogue to make a scene more visual or imaginatively present to an audience.	This technique appears at least as far back as the Arabian Nights.
Euphuism	An artificial, highly elaborate way of writing or speaking. Named from Euphues (1579) the prose romance by John Lyly.	"Is it not far better to abhor sins by the remembrance of others' faults, than by repentance of thine own follies?" (from Euphues, 1, lecture by the wise Neapolitan).
Hyperbole	Exaggeration used to evoke strong feelings or create an impression which is not meant to be taken literally. Hyperbole can be used for serious, ironic, or comic effects.	Sally could no longer hide her secret. Her pregnant belly was bigger than the planet on which she stood.
Imagery	Forming mental images of a scene using descriptive words, especially making use of the human senses. The same as sensory detail.	When the boots came off his feet with a leathery squeak, a smell of ferment and fish market immediately filled the small tent. The skin of his toes were red and raw and sensitive. The malodorous air was so toxic he thought he could almost taste his toes.
Leitwortstil	Purposefully repeating words that usually express a motif or theme important to the story.	This dates back at least to the Arabian Nights.
Metonymy	Word or phrase in a figure of speech in which a noun is referenced by something closely associated with it, rather than explicitly by the noun itself. This is not to be confused with synecdoche, in which a part of the whole stands for the thing itself.	Metonymy: The boxer threw in the towel. Synecdoche: She gave her hand in marriage.
Overstatement	Exaggerating something, often for emphasis (also known as hyperbole).	Sally's pregnant belly most likely weighed as much as the scooter she used to ride before she got pregnant.
Onomatopoeia	Words that imitate/spell a sound or noise. Word that sounds the same as, or similar to what the word means.	"Boom goes the dynamite." "Bang!" "Bark." (comic books)
Oxymoron	A term made of two words that deliberately or coincidentally imply each other's opposite.	"terrible beauty"
Paradox	A phrase that describes an idea composed of concepts that conflict.	"It was the best of times, it was the worst of times." (A Tale of Two Cities)
Parody	Ridicule by overstated imitation, usually humorous.	MAD Magazine
Pastiche	Using forms and styles from another author, generally as an affectionate tribute.	Such as the many stories featuring Sherlock Holmes not written by Arthur Conan Doyle, or much of the Cthulhu Mythos.
Pathos	Emotional appeal, one of the three modes of persuasion in rhetoric that the author uses to inspire pity or sorrow towards a character—typically does not counterbalance the target character's suffering with a positive outcome, as in Tragedy.	In Romeo and Juliet, the two main characters each commit suicide at the sight of the supposedly dead lover, however the audience knows these actions to be rash and unnecessary. Therefore, Shakespeare makes for the emotional appeal for the unnecessary tragedy behind the young characters' rash interpretations about love and life.
Personification	Using comparative metaphors and similes to give characteristics to abstract concepts.	Taken from Act I, Scene II of Romeo and Juliet: "When well-appareled April on the heel / Of limping winter treads."
Polyptoton	Words derived from the same root in a sentence.	"Not as a call to battle, though embattled we are." John F. Kennedy, Inaugural Address, January 20, 1961.
Polysyndeton	Polysyndeton is the use of several conjunctions in close succession. This provides a sense of exaggeration designed to wear down the audience.	An example of this is in the first chapter of Great Expectations by Charles Dickens: "A man who had been soaked in water, and smothered in mud, and lamed by stones, and cut by flints, and stung by nettles, and torn by briars; who limped, and shivered, and glared and growled; and whose teeth chattered in his head as he seized me by the chin."
Satire	The use of humor, irony or exaggeration to criticize	An example is Network. One of the earliest examples is Gulliver's Travels, written by Jonathan Swift. The television program South Park is another.
Sensory detail	Sight, sound, taste, touch, smell. The same as imagery.	The boot was tough and sinewy between his hard-biting teeth. There was no flavor to speak of except for the blandness of all the dirt that the boot had soaked up over the years. The only thing the boot reminded him of was the smell of a wet dog.
Understatement	A diminishing or softening of a theme for effect.	The broken ends of the long bone were sticking through the bleeding skin, but it wasn't something that always killed a man.
Title drop	Line of dialogue used to announce the name of the piece.	In The Breakfast Club, the final line is "Sincerely yours, The Breakfast Club".

== Theme ==
Name	Definition	Example
Irony	This discrepancy between expectation and reality occurs in three forms: situational irony, where a situation features a discrepancy between what is expected and what is actualized; dramatic irony, where a character is unaware of pivotal information already revealed to the audience (the discrepancy here lies in the two levels of awareness between the character and the audience); and verbal irony, where one states one thing while meaning another. The difference between verbal irony and sarcasm is exquisitely subtle and often contested. The concept of irony is too often misunderstood in popular usage. Unfortunate circumstances and coincidences do not constitute irony (nor do they qualify as being tragic). See the Usage controversy section under irony, and the term tragedy.	A person hears a prophecy about himself. His endeavor to stop the prophecy from coming true makes it come true.
Metaphor	Evoking imagination by means of using figurative language.	Her tears were a river flowing down her cheeks.
Thematic patterning	Distributing recurrent thematic concepts and moralistic motifs among various incidents and frames of a story. In a skillfully crafted tale, thematic patterning may emphasize the unifying argument or salient idea that disparate events and frames have in common.	Each of the chapters of Ulysses by James Joyce.

== Character ==
Name	Type	Notes
Anthropomorphism	Form of personification that applies human-like characteristics to something that is nonhuman (e.g. animals or objects).	The Adventures of Pinocchio by Carlo Collodi or the Cheshire Cat of Alice's Adventures in Wonderland by Lewis Carroll.
Hamartia	The character flaw of an initially rich and powerful hero that leads to his tragic downfall. This is also referred to as the tragic flaw.	Oedipus kills his own father because he does not understand his true parentage.
Pathetic fallacy	Reflecting a character's (usually the protagonist) mood in the atmosphere or inanimate objects. Related to anthropomorphism and projection.	For example, the storm in William Shakespeare's King Lear, which mirrors Lear's mental deterioration.

== See also ==
- Plot device
- Rhetorical device
