= Beverly Garland =

American actress (1926–2008)

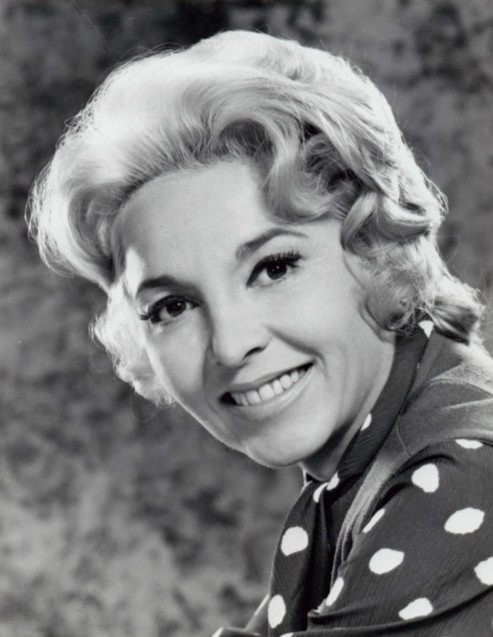
- Garland in 1969
- Born: Beverly Lucy Fessenden; October 17, 1926; Santa Cruz, California, U.S.
- Died: December 5, 2008 (aged 82); Los Angeles, California, U.S.
- Other name: Beverly Campbell
- Occupation: Actress
- Years active: 1949–2005
- Spouses: Bob Campbell (m. 1945; divorced); Richard Garland (m. 1951; div. 1953) Filmore Crank (m. 1960; died 1999)
- Children: 2

Beverly Lucy Garland (née Fessenden; October 17, 1926 – December 5, 2008) was an American actress. Her work in feature films primarily consisted of small parts in a few major productions or leads in low-budget action and science-fiction movies; however, she had prominent recurring roles on several popular television series.

In 1957–1958, she starred in the TV crime-drama Decoy, which ran for 39 episodes, but she may be best remembered as Barbara Harper Douglas, the woman who married widower Steve Douglas (Fred MacMurray) in the latter years of the sitcom My Three Sons. She played in that role from 1969 until the series concluded in 1972. In the 1980s, she co-starred as Dotty West, the mother of Kate Jackson's character, in the CBS television series Scarecrow and Mrs. King. She had a recurring role as Ginger Jackson on 7th Heaven.

== Early life ==
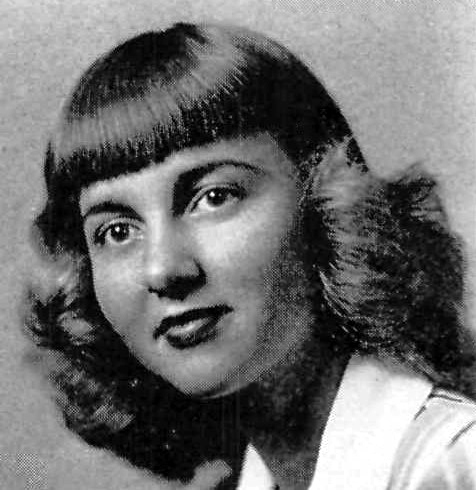
Garland in 1945 aged 19

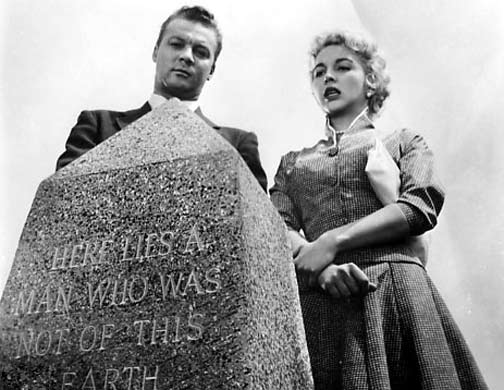
Morgan Jones and Garland in Not of This Earth (1957)

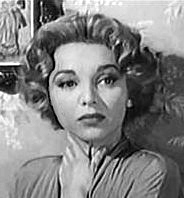
Garland in an episode of Decoy (1958).

Beverly Lucy Fessenden was born on October 17, 1926, in Santa Cruz, California, the daughter of Amelia Rose (née Scherer), a businesswoman, and James Atkins Fessenden, a singer and salesman. Garland grew up in Glendale, California. She was a drama student of Anita Arliss, the sister of actor George Arliss. The family subsequently moved to Phoenix, Arizona, where she graduated from North High School. She was a student at Glendale City College, and she honed her acting skills in summer stock theatre.

== Career ==
Garland's debut role (credited as Beverly Campbell) was as a secrets-keeping secretary in the film noir feature D.O.A. (1949), starring Edmond O'Brien. O'Brien personally conducted her auditions, reading lines with her.

She then played Nina in the 1950 drama Mama Rosa. Many of her roles during this time were of secure, tough women who could handle themselves in violent situations. In 1956, she played a female marshal in the Western Gunslinger with Chris Alcaide as her deputy; a prison escapee in Swamp Diamonds; and a scientist's wife who battles an alien in It Conquered the World. All three films were directed by Roger Corman, and all were parodied in the 1990s by Mystery Science Theater 3000.

== Television success ==
Garland appeared in 4 episodes of Four Star Playhouse (1954–1956).

In 1955, Garland was cast in the episode "Man Down, Woman Screaming" of Rod Cameron's first syndicated series, City Detective. On September 5, 1955, she co-starred in an episode of Science Fiction Theatre called "The Negative Man". Around the same time, she appeared in the first Brian Keith series, Crusader.

Garland guest-starred in 1956 as Nelli Austin, a rodeo sharpshooter, in the episode "Rodeo Rough House" of Rod Cameron's syndicated drama series State Trooper. Claude Akins appeared in this episode as the murderous rodeo clown. Garland and Akins appeared together again in the 1960 episode "Prison Trail" of the TV series Wanted: Dead or Alive and again in the 1963 episode "The Chooser of the Slain" of The Dakotas. Garland and Akins also appeared in The Zane Grey Theatre episodes "Courage is a Gun" and "Jericho".

From 1957 to 1958, Garland starred as undercover police officer Casey Jones in the television series Decoy, the first American television police series with a woman in the starring role. It lasted for a single season of 39 episodes.

In 1959, Garland was cast as the wife of a bounty hunter in Season 2, Episode 2 of Rawhide "Incident of the Roman Candles". The same year, she had a two guest appearances in the CBS post-Civil War adventure series Yancy Derringer, appearing as the character Coco the pirate, one of Yancy's many female friends.

In 1960, Garland appeared twice as Doris Denny Bona in the episodes "Remember the Alamo" and "The Widow of Kill Cove" of Cameron's third syndicated series, Coronado 9. In 1960, Garland was cast as Dr. Nora James in the episode "Three Graves" of Riverboat. Garland also appeared in 1960 in episode 28, "Saddles and Spurs", of the first season of the Western show Laramie.

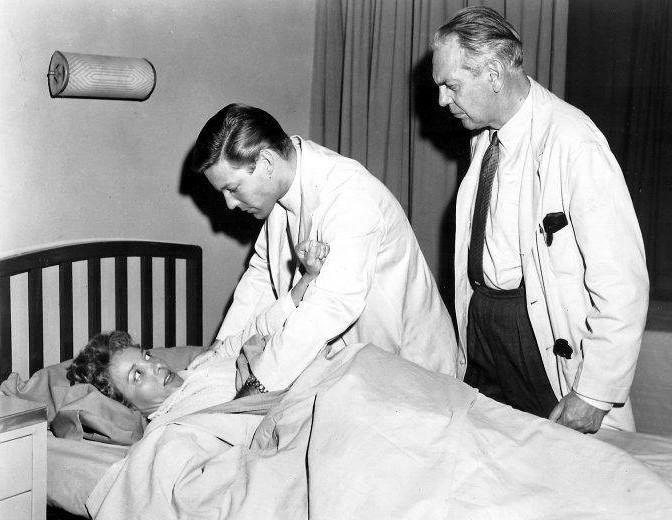
Beverly Garland, Richard Chamberlain and Raymond Massey in the first episode of Dr. Kildare (1961)

In 1962–1963, Garland was a regular on the CBS version of Stump the Stars.

In 1963, she starred as “Leah”, a bar girl in the Long Branch who loses her fiancée then is revived in life in the Gunsmoke episode “The Odyssey of Jubal Tanner” (S8E36).

She appeared in a season-one episode, "Smoke Screen", of The Fugitive. In the 1964–1965 television season, she co-starred as Ellie Collins on The Bing Crosby Show. She appeared in the 1968 feature film Pretty Poison, but is best known for playing suburban mothers on My Three Sons and Scarecrow and Mrs. King.

In 1974, Garland went under the ape makeup for an episode of the Planet of the Apes television series. The episode was called "The Interrogation" and she played a rather cunning chimpanzee who tries, through brainwashing, to get answers from the captured Pete Burke.

In the 1980s, she co-starred as Dotty West, the mother of Kate Jackson's character for the entire four-season run of the CBS television series Scarecrow and Mrs. King. She also featured in two episodes of Remington Steele as the mother of Laura Holt (played by series star Stephanie Zimbalist) in the early 1980s and in six episodes of Lois and Clark: The New Adventures of Superman as the mother of Lois Lane in the mid-1990s. Her decades of television guest appearances included episodes of The Twilight Zone, Kung Fu, and The Mary Tyler Moore Show.

On 7th Heaven (August 26, 1996 through May 8, 2006), she appeared in nine episodes as Ginger Jackson, the stepmother of Annie Camden, opposite Graham Jarvis. In addition to working with Peter Graves on 7th Heaven, Garland also starred opposite Graves's brother, James Arness, in four episodes of Gunsmoke.

== Radio ==
On radio, she was an original player of the California Actors Radio Theatre, founded in 1984 by Peggy Webber, which often recorded its programs on the grounds of Garland's hotel in the Beverly Garland Little Theater, which was decorated with large movie posters from many of her feature films.

== Recognition ==
Garland was nominated for a Best Actress in a Single Performance Emmy Award for her work on Medic (1955). For her contribution to the television industry, Garland has a star on the Hollywood Walk of Fame at 6801 Hollywood Boulevard. It was dedicated on January 26, 1983.

== Personal life ==
Garland married actor Richard Garland in 1951. Although they divorced two years later, she continued to use his last name professionally.

In 1999, her husband of 39 years, businessman Filmore Crank, died. They had two children together, and two from Crank's previous marriage.

Later, Garland increased her time toward the North Hollywood Howard Johnson's Motor Lodge, a 1972 Mission Revival 255-room hotel on seven acres near Universal City that Crank built and later named the Beverly Garland Holiday Inn Resort and Conference Center, and renamed The Garland in 2014.

She was the honorary mayor of North Hollywood, and she served on the boards of the California Tourism Corporation and the Greater Los Angeles Visitors' and Convention Bureau.

== Death ==
On December 5, 2008, Garland died from natural causes at her home of over 40 years in the Hollywood Hills after a lengthy illness.

Several hundred people attended a memorial service and reception on December 13 at her namesake hotel property. Her body was cremated.

== Selected filmography ==
Year	Title	Role	Other notes
1950	D.O.A.	Miss Foster	Credited as Beverly Campbell
1950	The Lone Ranger	Laura Lawson	TV, 1 episode: "The Beeler Gang"
1951	Strictly Dishonorable	Armorclad Mentoring Isabelle in opera Caesar	Uncredited
1953	The Neanderthal Man	Nola Mason, waitress	
1953	Problem Girls	Nancy Eaton	
1954	The Miami Story	Holly Abbott	
1954	The Desperado	Laurie Bannerman	
1954	Killer Leopard	Linda Winters	featuring Bomba the Jungle Boy
1954	Medic	Estelle Collins	TV, 1 episode: "White Is the Color" Nominated for Best Actress in a Single Performance Emmy Award
1954–1956	Four Star Playhouse	Various roles	TV, 4 episodes
1955	Swamp Women	Vera	
1955	Navy Log	Sally	TV, 1 episode: "Family Special"
1955	Science Fiction Theater	Sally Torens	TV, 1 episode: "The Negative Man"
1955	New Orleans Uncensored	Mary Reilly	
1955	Sudden Danger	Phyllis Baxter	
1955–1959	The Millionaire	Louise Benson/Clara	TV, 2 episodes
1956	Gunslinger	Marshal Rose Hood	
1956	It Conquered the World	Claire Anderson	
1956	The Go-Getter	Peggy	
1956	Curucu, Beast of the Amazon	Dr. Andrea Romar	
1956	The Ford Television Theatre	Maria Perrin	TV, 1 episode: "Measure of Faith"
1956–1957	Wire Service	Ellen Gale	TV, 2 episodes
1957	Not of This Earth	Nurse Nadine Storey	
1957	Playhouse 90	Gay Sherman	TV, 1 episode: "The Edge of Innocence"
1957	The Joker Is Wild	Cassie Mack	
1957	Naked Paradise	Max MacKenzie	
1957–1959	Decoy	Casey Jones	TV, 39 episodes
1958	The Saga of Hemp Brown	Mona Langley	
1959	Trackdown	Dora Crow	TV, 1 episode: "Hard Lines"
1959	Yancy Derringer	Coco LaSalle	TV, 2 episodes
1959	The Alligator People	Joyce Webster, aka Jane Marvin	
1959	Hawaiian Eye	Rena Harrison	TV, 1 episode: "Shipment From Kihei"
1959	The Man from Blackhawk	Sarah Marshall	TV, 1 episode: "Logan's Policy", series premiere
1959–1963	Rawhide	Jennie Colby; Marcie; Della Locke	TV, 3 episodes
1959–1967	The Wonderful World of Disney	Mrs. Barko	TV, 6 episodes
1960	Tales of Wells Fargo	Pearl Hart	TV, 1 episode: "Pearl Hart"
1960	Wanted: Dead or Alive	Sally Lind	TV, 1 episode: "Prison Trail"
1960	Hong Kong	Irene Vance	TV, 1 episode: "Freebooter"
1960	Thriller	Ruth Kenton	TV, 1 episode: "Knock Three-One-Two"
1960	Stagecoach West	Sherry Hilton	TV, 1 episode: "The Storm"
1960	Perry Mason	Mauvis Meade	TV, 1 episode: "The Mythical Monkeys"
1960	Coronado 9	Various roles	TV, 2 episodes
1960	The Twilight Zone	Maggie	TV, 1 episode: "The Four of Us Are Dying"
1961	Checkmate	Jean	TV, 1 episode: "Between Two Guns"
1961	The Asphalt Jungle	Caroline	TV, 1 episode: "The Nine-Twenty Hero"
1961	Danger Man	Jo Harris	TV, 1 episode: "Bury the Dead"
1961–1962	Dr. Kildare	Various roles	TV, 2 episodes
1962	Bus Stop	Janie	TV, 1 episode: "Summer Lightning"
1962	Cain's Hundred	Jeanette	TV, 1 episode: "The Left Side of Canada"
1962	Going My Way	Marsha	TV, 1 episode: "A Saint for Momma"
1962	The Nurses	Ginny Nemets	TV, 1 episode: "The Walls Came Tumbling Down"
1962	Stark Fear	Ellen Winslow	
1963	The Dakotas	Katherine Channing	TV, 1 episode: "The Chooser of the Slain"
1963	Sam Benedict	Jan Fielding	TV, 1 episode: "Image of a Toad"
1963	Twice-Told Tales	Alice Pyncheon	"House of the Seven Gables" (one of three stories in the film)
1963	The Fugitive	Nurse Doris Stillwell	TV, 1 episode: "Smoke Screen"
1963	The Farmer's Daughter	Ellen	TV, 1 episode: "The Stand-In"
1963–1970	Gunsmoke	Various roles	TV, 4 episodes
1964	Kraft Suspense Theatre	JoAnne Kling	TV, 1 episode: "Charlie, He Couldn't Kill a Fly"
1965	A Man Called Shenandoah	Kate	TV, 1 episode: "The Onslaught"
1965	Laredo	Aggie	TV, 1 episode: "Lazyfoot, Where Are You?"
1966	Pistols 'n' Petticoats	Ross Guttley	TV, 1 episode: "The Ross Guttley Story"
1967	Judd, for the Defense	Dorothy Shaw	TV, 1 episode: "The Deep End"
1967–1969	The Wild Wild West	Various roles	TV, 2 episodes
1968	The Mothers-in-Law	Audrey Fleming	TV, 1 episode: "Jealousy Makes the Heart Grow Fonder"
1968	Pretty Poison	Mrs. Stepanek	
1968–1973	Mannix	Edna Restin	TV, 3 episodes
1969	Here's Lucy	Secretary	TV, 1 episode: "Lucy Goes to the Air Force Academy: Part 2" Uncredited
1969	The Mad Room	Mrs. Racine	
1969–1972	My Three Sons	Barbara Harper Douglas	TV, 74 episodes
1970	Then Came Bronson	Beth Morse	TV, 1 episode: "The Mary R"
1972	The Mod Squad	Ellie Todd	TV, 1 episode: "Eyes of the Beholder"
1972	Temperatures Rising	Claudia	TV, 1 episode: "RX: Love"
1972–1975	Marcus Welby, M.D.	Nancy Zimmer	TV, 2 episodes
1973	Owen Marshall: Counselor at Law	Mrs. Varni	TV, 1 episode: "Sometimes Tough Is Good"
1973	The Rookies	Pat Whitfield	TV, 1 episode: "Three Hours to Kill"
1973	Cannon	Cecilia Thatcher	TV, 1 episode: "Deadly Heritage"
1973	The New Adventures of Perry Mason	Laura Lee	TV, 1 episode: "The Case of the Prodigal Prophet"
1973	Love, American Style	Maria Lombardi	TV, 1 episode
1974	Where the Red Fern Grows	Mother	TV, 1 episode: "Love and the Big Top"
1974	Airport 1975	Mrs. Scott Freeman	
1974	Ironside	Andrea Reynolds	TV, 1 episode: "The Over-the-Hill Blues"
1974–1975	Medical Center	Various roles	TV, 2 episodes
1975	The Mary Tyler Moore Show	Veronica Ludlow	TV, 1 episode: "Lou Douses an Old Flame"
1976–1977	Mary Hartman, Mary Hartman	Cookie LaRue	TV, 16 episodes
1977	The Six Million Dollar Man	The Secretary	TV, 1 episode: "Death Probe: Part 1"
1977	The Hardy Boys/Nancy Drew Mysteries	Thelma	TV, 1 episode: "Mystery of the Fallen Angels"
1977	Lanigan's Rabbi	Mollie Franks	TV, 1 episode: "Say It Ain't So, Chief"
1977	The Tony Randall Show	Sylvia Needleman	TV, 1 episode: "The Sylvia Needleman Experience"
1977	Sixth and Main	Monica Cord	
1979	How the West Was Won	Hanna	TV, 1 episode: "The Slavers"
1979	Charlie's Angels	Pat Justice	TV, 1 episode: "Cruising Angels"
1979	Roller Boogie	Lillian Barkley	
1980	Trapper John, M.D.	Mrs. Kaufman	TV, 2 episodes
1980	It's My Turn	Emma Lewin Gunzinger	
1981	Hart to Hart	Real Grandma	TV, 1 episode: "The Hartbreak Kid"
1981	Flamingo Road	Louise Stone	TV, 1 episode: "Heatwave"
1981	Magnum, P.I.	Florence Russell	TV, 1 episode: "Three Minus Two"
1981	Matt Houston	Mrs. Chapman	TV, 1 episode: "The Good Doctor"
1982–1983	Remington Steele	Abigail Holt	TV, 2 episodes
1983–1987	Scarecrow and Mrs. King	Dorothea "Dotty" West	TV, 88 episodes
1985	Hotel	Alice Korman	TV, 1 episode: "New Beginnings"
1985	Finder of Lost Loves	Lucy Rowens	TV, 1 episode: "Surrogates"
1990	The World's Oldest Living Bridesmaid	Brenda's Mother	
1991	P.S. I Luv U	Emma	TV, 1 episode: "Where There's a Will, There's a Dani"
1995	Friends	Aunt Iris	TV, 1 episode: "The One with All the Poker"
1995	Ellen	Eva	TV, 1 episode: "She Ain't Friendly, She's My Mother"
1995–1997	Lois & Clark: The New Adventures of Superman	Ellen Lane	TV, 6 episodes
1997	Diagnosis: Murder	Stella Carter	TV, 1 episode: "Hard-Boiled Murder"
1997–2004	7th Heaven	Ginger	TV, 9 episodes
1998	Teen Angel	Grandma	TV, 2 episodes
1998–1999	The Angry Beavers	Various roles	TV, 3 episodes
2000–2001	Port Charles	Estelle Reese	TV, 54 episodes
2002	Weakest Link	Herself (contestant)	TV Moms Edition (first one voted off)
2003	National Lampoon's Christmas Vacation 2: Cousin Eddie's Island Adventure	Aunt Jessica	Television film
