= Writing style =

Manner of expression in writing

In literature, writing style is the manner of expressing thought in language characteristic of an individual, period, school, or nation. Thus, style is a term that may refer, at one and the same time, to singular aspects of an individual's writing habits or a particular document and to aspects that go well-beyond the individual writer. Beyond the essential elements of spelling, grammar, and punctuation, writing style is the choice of words, sentence structure, and paragraph structure, used to convey the meaning effectively. The former are referred to as rules, elements, essentials, mechanics, or handbook; the latter are referred to as style, or rhetoric. The rules are about what a writer does; style is about how the writer does it. While following the rules drawn from established English usage, a writer has great flexibility in how to express a concept. Some have suggested that the point of writing style is to:

- express the message to the reader simply, clearly, and convincingly;
- keep the reader attentive, engaged, and interested;

Some have suggested that writing style should not be used to:

- display the writer's personality;
- demonstrate the writer's skills, knowledge, or abilities;

although these aspects may be part of a writer's individual style.

While this article focuses on practical approaches to style, style has been analyzed from a number of systematic approaches, including corpus linguistics, historical variation, rhetoric, sociolinguistics, stylistics, and World Englishes.

== Alternative views ==
As Bryan Ray notes, however, style is a broader concern, one that can describe "readers' relationships with texts, the grammatical choices writers make, the importance of adhering to norms in certain contexts and deviating from them in others, the expression of social identity, and the emotional effects of particular devices on audiences."

== Choice of words ==
Diction, or the choice of words, is an element of a writer's style.

Suggestions for using diction include the use of a dictionary, and the avoidance of redundancy and clichés. Such advice can be found in style guides.

== Choice of sentence structure ==
The choice of sentence structure pertains to how meaning is conveyed, to phrasing, to word choice, and to tone. Advice on these and other topics can be found in style guides.

== Choice of paragraph structure ==
Paragraphs may express a single unfolding idea. Paragraphs may be particular steps in the expression of a larger thesis. The sentences within a paragraph may support and extend one another in various ways. Advice on the use of paragraphs may include the avoidance of incoherence, choppiness, or long-windedness, and rigid construction; and can be found in style guides.

== Examples ==
The following rewrite of the sentence, "These are the times that try men's souls." by Thomas Paine, changes the impact of the message.

Times like these try men's souls.
How trying it is to live in these times!
These are trying times for men's souls.
Soulwise, these are trying times.

Authors convey their messages in different manners. For example:

Hamlet, Act II, Scene 2 (1599–1602) by William Shakespeare:

HAMLET. I will tell you why; so shall my anticipation prevent your discovery, and your secrecy to the king and queen moult no feather. I have of late—but wherefore I know not—lost all my mirth, forgone all custom of exercises; and indeed it goes so heavily with my disposition that this goodly frame, the earth, seems to me a sterile promontory; this most excellent canopy, the air, look you, this brave o'erhanging firmament, this majestical roof fretted with golden fire, why, it appears no other thing to me than a foul and pestilent congregation of vapors. What a piece of work is a man! how noble in reason! how infinite in faculty! in form and moving how expressed and admirable! in action how like an angel! in apprehension how like a god! the beauty of the world! the paragon of animals! And yet, to me, what is this quintessence of dust? man delights not me; no, nor woman neither, though by your smiling you seem to say so.

A Tale of Two Cities (1859) by Charles Dickens:

It was the best of times, it was the worst of times, it was the age of wisdom, it was the age of foolishness, it was the epoch of belief, it was the epoch of incredulity, it was the season of Light, it was the season of Darkness, it was the spring of hope, it was the winter of despair, we had everything before us, we had nothing before us, we were all going direct to Heaven, we were all going direct the other way – in short, the period was so far like the present period, that some of its noisiest authorities insisted on its being received, for good or for evil, in the superlative degree of comparison only.

"Memories of Christmas" (1945) by Dylan Thomas:

One Christmas was so much like another, in those years, around the sea-town corner now, and out of all sound except the distant speaking of the voices I sometimes hear a moment before sleep, that I can never remember whether it snowed for six days and six nights when I was twelve or whether it snowed for twelve days and twelve nights when I was six; or whether the ice broke and the skating grocer vanished like a snowman through a white trap-door on that same Christmas Day that the mince-pies finished Uncle Arnold and we tobogganed down the seaward hill, all the afternoon, on the best tea-tray, and Mrs. Griffiths complained, and we threw a snowball at her niece, and my hands burned so, with the heat and the cold, when I held them in front of the fire, that I cried for twenty minutes and then had some jelly.

"The Strawberry Window" (1955) by Ray Bradbury:

In his dream he was shutting the front door with its strawberry windows and lemon windows and windows like white clouds and windows like clear water in a country stream. Two dozen panes squared round the one big pane, colored of fruit wines and gelatins and cool water ices. He remembered his father holding him up as a child. "Look!" And through the green glass the world was emerald, moss, and summer mint. "Look!" The lilac pane made livid grapes of all the passers-by. And at last the strawberry glass perpetually bathed the town in roseate warmth, carpeted the world in pink sunrise, and made the cut lawn seem imported from some Persian rug bazaar. The strawberry window, best of all, cured people of their paleness, warmed the cold rain, and set the blowing, shifting February snows afire.

"Letter from Birmingham Jail" (1963) by Martin Luther King Jr.:

Moreover, I am cognizant of the interrelatedness of all communities and states. I cannot sit idly by in Atlanta and not be concerned about what happens in Birmingham. Injustice anywhere is a threat to justice everywhere. We are caught in an inescapable network of mutuality, tied in a single garment of destiny. Whatever affects one directly, affects all indirectly. Never again can we afford to live with the narrow, provincial "outside agitator" idea. Anyone who lives inside the United States can never be considered an outsider anywhere within its bounds.

== Writer's voice ==
The writer's voice (or writing voice, authorial voice) is a term some critics use to refer to distinctive features of a written work in terms of spoken utterance. The voice of a literary work is then the specific group of characteristics displayed by the narrator or poetic "speaker" (or, in some uses, the actual author behind them), assessed in terms of tone, style, or personality. Distinctions between various kinds of narrative voice tend to be distinctions between kinds of narrator in terms of how they address the reader (rather than in terms of their perception of events, as in the distinct concept of point of view). Likewise in non-narrative poems, distinctions are sometimes made between the personal voice of a private lyric and the assumed voice (the persona) of a dramatic monologue.

An author uses sentence patterns not only to make a point or tell a story, but to do it in a characteristic way.

Writer’s voice can be identified through specific features within language including qualifying words, emphasizing words, and the use of personal pronouns. These features signal a writer’s attitude toward a subject. For example, saying "perhaps" can indicate doubt, while saying "clearly" can indicate confidence and make a reading more persuasive in academic writing. A reader's perception of the writer's identity is shaped by these elements. A writers voice is always adapting over time; more experienced writers develop more distinctive features of their voice.Voice can be transferred across languages in multilingual writing and is not a fixed concept. It changes depending on audience and purpose.

Historically, the understanding of voice in writing has shifted from an individual view of self expression to a conversational view emphasizing interactions between writers and readers.

Writing coaches, teachers, and authors of creative writing books often speak of the writer's voice as distinguished from other literary elements. In some instances, voice is defined nearly the same as style; in others, as genre, literary mode, point of view, mood, or tone. Academic researchers approach voice from many perspectives. Some argue voice is a measurable feature, while others challenge the existence of the concept itself.

== See also ==
- Elocutio
- Figure of speech
- Rhetorical device
