= Dwight V. Swain =

American novelist

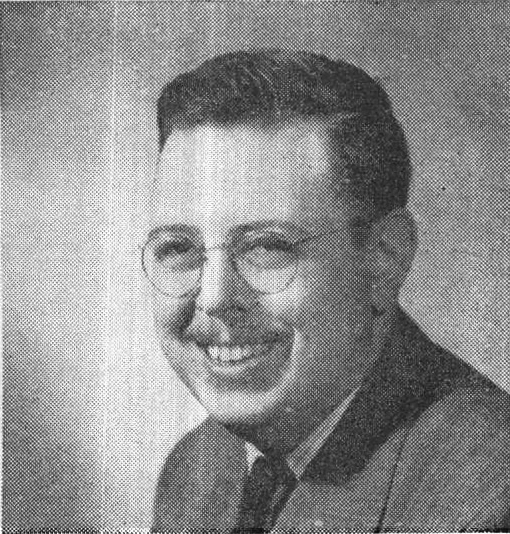
- Dwight V Swain c.1951.
- Born: Dwight Vreeland Swain; November 17, 1915; Rochester, Michigan, U.S.
- Died: February 24, 1992 (aged 76); Norman, Oklahoma, U.S.
- Occupations: Screenwriter, author, novelist, educator
- Years active: c. 1935–c. 1974
- Spouses: Margaret Reaves Simpson (m. 1942; div. 1968); Joye Rachael Boulton] (m. 1969)

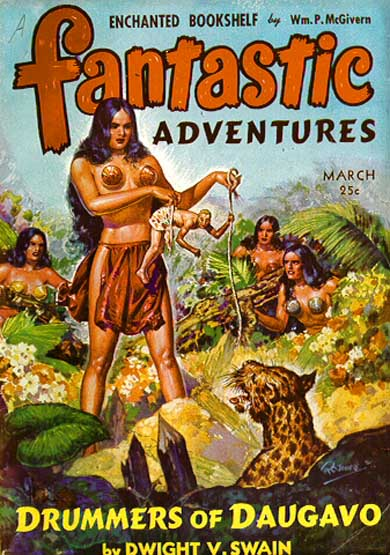
Swain's novella "Drummers of Daugavo" was the cover story for the March 1943 issue of Fantastic Adventures, illustrated by Robert Gibson Jones.

Dwight Vreeland Swain (November 17, 1915 – February 24, 1992), born in Rochester, Michigan, was an American author, screenwriter and teacher. Swain was a member of the Oklahoma Professional Writers Hall of Fame.

== Early life and career ==
Born in Rochester, Michigan, Swain was the son of John Edgar Swain, a railroad telegrapher, and Florence Marietta Vreeland. In 1937, he graduated from the University of Michigan with a Bachelor of Arts in journalism.

Swain's first published story appeared in Target Magazine in approximately 1935. His first science fiction story sold was "Henry Horn's Super Solvent", which appeared in Fantastic Adventures in November 1941. He contributed stories in the science fiction, mystery, Western, and action-adventure genres to a variety of magazines of the pulp variety. His first published book was The Transposed Man (1955), which appeared as Ace Double D-113, bound dos-à-dos with J.T. McIntosh's One In Three Hundred. He wrote several more novels, including The Horde From Infinity, published as another Ace Double with The Day The Earth Froze by Gerald Hatch. During the 1960s, he scripted a motion picture, Stark Fear, featuring Kenneth Tobey and Beverly Garland.

=== Teaching ===
He joined the staff of the successful Professional Writing Program of the University of Oklahoma, training writers of commercial fiction and movies. He pioneered scripting documentaries and educational/instructional movies using dramatic techniques, rather than the previously common talking heads.

He later published non-fiction books about writing, including Techniques of the Selling Writer; Film Scriptwriting; Creating Characters: How to Build Story People; and Scripting for Video and Audiovisual Media, and was in demand as a speaker at writers' conferences throughout the USA and Mexico.

== Honors ==
In June 1974, the Dwight V. Swain Award, an annual scholarship given to the top undergraduate Professional Writing student, was instituted by the School of Journalism, University of Oklahoma. In November 1991, Swain was inducted into the Oklahoma Professional Writer's Hall of Fame.

== Personal life and death ==
Swain married twice. In Chicago, on August 6, 1942, he married Margaret Reaves Simpson in Chicago on August 6, 1942. They were divorced in 1968, having produced one child, a son, Thomas McCray Swain. From February 12, 1969 until his death, Swain was married to Joye Raechel Boulton. While living in San Miguel de Allende, Mexico, they adopted Rocio Mendez Garcia (born 1959) and Antonia (born 1964). Later, in Costa Rica, they adopted Ronald, who would die of AIDS just two years after the death of his adoptive father.

On February 24, 1992, Swain died of undisclosed causes at his home in Norman, Oklahoma. He was surrounded by his wife Joye and the son from his previous marriage, Thomas McCray Swain, and his three adopted children.
