= Description =

Text for clarification; one of four rhetorical modes

Description is any type of communication that aims to make vivid a place, object, person, group, or other physical entity. It is one of four rhetorical modes (also known as modes of discourse), along with exposition, argumentation, and narration.

== Fiction writing ==
Fiction writing specifically has modes such as action, exposition, description, dialogue, summary, and transition. Author Peter Selgin refers to methods, including action, dialogue, thoughts, summary, scenes, and description.

Description is the mode for transmitting a mental image of the particulars of a story. Together with dialogue, narration, exposition, and summarization, it is one of the most widely recognized of the fiction-writing modes. As stated in Writing from A to Z, edited by Kirk Polking, it is more than the amassing of details; it is bringing something to life by carefully choosing and arranging words and phrases to produce the desired effect.

== Purple prose ==
A purple patch is an over-written passage in which the writer has strained too hard to achieve an impressive effect, by elaborate figures or other means. The phrase (Latin: "purpureus pannus") was first used by the Roman poet Horace in his Ars Poetica (c. 20 BC) to denote an irrelevant and excessively ornate passage; the sense of irrelevance is normally absent in modern usage, although such passages are usually incongruous. By extension, purple prose is lavishly figurative, rhythmic, or otherwise overwrought.

== Philosophy ==
In philosophy, the nature of description has been an important question since Bertrand Russell's classical texts.

== See also ==
- Anthropomorphism
- Cliché
- Diction
- Grammatical modifier
- Grammatical voice
- Metaphors
- Nouns
- Objectification
- Personification
- Referential density
- Relevance
- Rhetorical devices
- Simile
- Species description
- Verisimilitude
