= Evan Marshall (agent) =

American novelist (born 1956)

- Born: Evan Stuart Marshall; June 5, 1956 (age 70); Boston, Massachusetts, U.S.
- Occupations: Literary agent; author; publisher
- Website: www.evanmarshallagency.com

Evan Stuart Marshall (born June 5, 1956, in Boston, Massachusetts) is an American literary agent, author of murder mysteries and nonfiction books, editor, and publisher of Marshall Plan software.

== Life and career ==
Marshall has held senior editorial positions at Houghton Mifflin, Ariel Books, New American Library, Everest House and Dodd, Mead, where he acquired national and international bestsellers. He was also a correspondent for Writer's Digest and covered commercial fiction. He wrote cover stories on blockbuster and bestselling novels and how to find and work with agents. Marshall's articles have appeared in reference anthologies and collected works. He is often interviewed for his expertise in novel writing, and helping novel writers.

== Works ==
=== Writings ===
"Hidden Manhattan" Mystery Series:

- City in Shadow, Severn House Publishers, New York, NY, 2010.
- Dark Alley, Severn House Publishers, New York, NY, 2009.
- Evil Justice, Severn House Publishers, New York, NY, 2009.
- Death is Disposable, Severn House Publishers, New York, NY, 2008.

"Jane Stuart and Winky" Mystery Series:

- Crushing Crystal, Kensington Books, New York, NY, 2004.
- Toasting Tina, Kensington Books, New York, NY, 2003.
- Icing Ivy, Kensington Books, New York, NY, 2002.
- Stabbing Stephanie, Kensington Books, New York, NY, 2001.
- Hanging Hannah, Kensington Books, New York, NY, 2000.
- Missing Marlene, Kensington Books, New York, NY, 1999.

=== The Marshall Plan Book Series ===
- The Marshall Plan for Novel Writing: A 16-Step Program Guaranteed to Take You From Idea to Completed Manuscript, Writer's Digest Books, 1998.

The first book in the series describes novel writing as a 16-step process, taking the novel's intended finished length into account from the beginning. Marshall focuses specifically on fiction, identifying it as the writing genre most likely to be picked up by a publisher. Drawing from Dwight V. Swain and Jack Bickham's techniques, Marshall identifies two core plotting units: the action section and the reaction section. Marshall recommends the number, and the type of action and reaction sections in relation to a novel's length. He also recommends the corresponding story arc with plot points all in a specific order, the number and type of viewpoint characters, the type of opposition, and other elements of plot and character development.

- The Marshall Plan Workbook

The second book in the series concentrates on the fundamental details of producing a novel. The first half of the book assists the writer in building characters, developing plot and setting goals. The second half is the Plan Blueprint, a 58-page section of fill-in-the-blank sheets to help writers produce a novel. The marketing information included focuses on the manuscript itself, how it should look, how many pages, paper weight, etc.

- The Marshall Plan for Getting Your Novel Published

The third book in the series focuses on how to take the next step of sending work to editors and agents, and promoting a novel.

== Reviews ==
- Publishers Weekly review of Hanging Hannah.
- Kirkus Reviews review of Stabbing Stephanie.
- Booklist review of Death is Disposable.

== Personal life ==
Marshall was born in Boston, Massachusetts, and raised in Sharon, Massachusetts. He graduated magna cum laude from Boston College. He is married to Martha Jewett, a business book editor, and literary agent who manages The Marshall Plan software. They have two sons.
