= Jessica Page Morrell =

American author

- Born: United States
- Occupation: Writer
- Writing career
- Subject: Writing

Jessica Page Morrell is an American author.

== Career ==
Morrell is a contributor to The Writer and Writer's Digest magazines.

Her book, Thanks But This Isn't For Us (2009), describes mistakes that new authors make and how these writers can fix their writing. In particular, she lays out the necessity and process of creating a plan or structure for a novel, before starting to write one. Library Journal states that she "convincingly portrays the craft of writing for publication."

Morrell conducts workshops throughout the Pacific Northwest.

Morrell grew up in Wisconsin and earned a Bachelor of Arts degree at the University of Wisconsin–Madison. She has one daughter and two granddaughters and lives in Portland, Oregon.

== Selected works ==
- Thanks, But This Isn't for Us: A (Sort of) Compassionate Guide to Why Your Writing is Being Rejected (2009) Tarcher
- Bullies, Bastards and Bitches: How to Write the Bad Guys of Fiction (2008) Writer's Digest Books
- The Writer's I Ching: Wisdom for the Creative Life (2007) Running Press Book Publishers
- Voices from the Street: Truths about Homelessness from the Sisters of the Road (2007) Gray Sunshine
- Between the Lines: Master the Subtle Elements of Fiction Writing (2006) Writer's Digest Books
- Writing Out the Storm (1998) Collectors Press
