= Scene (performing arts) =

Dramatic part of a story, at a specific time and place, between specific characters

A scene is a dramatic part of a story, at a specific time and place, between specific characters. The term is used in both filmmaking and theatre, with some distinctions between the two.

== Theatre ==
In drama, a scene is a unit of action, often a subdivision of an act.

=== French scene ===
A "French scene" is a scene in which the beginning and end are marked by a change in the presence of characters onstage, rather than by the lights going up or down or the set being changed.

=== Obligatory scene ===
From the French scène à faire, an obligatory scene is a scene (usually highly charged with emotion) which is anticipated by the audience and provided by an obliging playwright. An example is Hamlet 3.4, when Hamlet confronts his mother.

== Film ==
In filmmaking and video production, a scene is generally thought of as a section of a motion picture in a single location and continuous time made up of a series of shots, which are each a set of contiguous frames from individual cameras from varying angles.

A scene is a part of a film, as well as an act, a sequence (longer or shorter than a scene), and a setting (usually shorter than a scene). While the terms refer to a set sequence and continuity of observation, resulting from the handling of the camera or by the editor, the term "scene" refers to the continuity of the observed action: an association of time, place, or characters. The term may refer to the division of the film from the screenplay, from the finished film, or it may only occur in the mind of the spectator who is trying to close on a logic of action. For example, parts of an action film at the same location, that play at different times can also consist of several scenes. Likewise, there can be parallel action scenes at different locations usually in separate scenes, except that they would be connected by media such as telephone, video, etc.

Due to the ability to edit recorded visual works, a movie scene is much shorter than a stage play scene. Because of their frequent appearance in films, some types of scenes have acquired names, such as love scene, sex scene, nude scene, dream scene, action scene, car chase scene, crash scene, emotional scene, fight scene, tragedy scene, or post-credits scene. There is usually an opening scene and a closing scene. Furthermore, some scenes can generate a "privileged moment" within a film: a privileged moment may perform functions within its immediate narrative context, but may also connect to and draw power from resemblances with similar scenes in other films.

In contrast, the traditional movie script is divided into acts, but those categories are less frequently used in the digital technology. The scene is important for the unity of the action of the film, while a stage drama is typically divided into acts. The division of a movie into scenes is usually done in the script. Some action scenes need to be planned very carefully.

== Scene-writing techniques ==
In his 2008 book The Anatomy of Story, John Truby suggests that the beginning of a scene should frame what the whole scene will be about, and that the scene should then funnel down to a single point, with the most important word or line of dialogue stated last.

Tension (also known as suspense) within a scene can be created in any of the ways discussed below:

- Anything that is unresolved creates tension. More specifically, conflict, dissonance, and instability.
- Uncertainty creates tension. Whenever the audience cannot confidently predict the outcome of events, uncertainty is present.
- Expectation, prediction, and anticipation create tension within a scene. Give the audience a sense that if they just stay engaged for a very short time, they will see or know that which they desire.
- Emotional significance of anticipated events increases tension. The intensity of the tension is proportional to the emotional audience's (or character's) investment in the outcome.
- Lack of control creates tension. A character or audience lacks control whenever they are in an unfamiliar environment, or within the power of something or somebody. Urgency is a common example of when lack of control creates tension.

Show, don't tell is a common technique to make a scene more engaging by implying information rather than saying it directly.

== See also ==
- Fiction
- Long take
- Plot (narrative)
- Scene and sequel
- Theatrical scenery
