= Minimalism (technical communication) =

== Definition ==
Minimalism in structured writing, topic-based authoring, and technical writing is based on the ideas of John Millar Carroll and others. In his work, Carroll explained that minimalism is a way to make rapid achievement of realistic projects right from the start of training, allowing people to understand the content just from reading it once. Minimalism strives to reduce interference of information delivery with the user's sense-making process. It does not try to eliminate any chance of the user making a mistake, but regards an error as a teachable moment that content can exploit. Minimalism is action-oriented, using as little words as possible to understand how to fulfill a task.

== History ==
Like Robert E. Horn's work on information mapping, John Carroll's principles of Minimalism were based in part on cognitive studies and learning research at Harvard and Columbia University, by Jerome Bruner, Jerome Kagan, B.F. Skinner, George A. Miller, and others. Carroll argues that training materials should present short task-oriented chunks, not lengthy, monolithic documentation that tries to explain everything in a long narrative.

A historian of technical communication, R. John Brockmann, points out that Fred Bethke and others at IBM enunciated task orientation as a principle a decade earlier in a report on IBM Publishing Guidelines.

Modern users are often already familiar with much of what a typical long manual describes, what they need is information to solve a task at hand. Carroll explains that documentation should encourage them to do this with a minimum of systematic instruction.

Darwin Information Typing Architecture (DITA) is built on Carroll's theories of Minimalism and Horn's theories of Information Mapping. DITA is an XML standard, an architectural approach, and a writing methodology, developed by technical communicators for technical communicators. DITA features modularity, structured authoring, single-sourced, topic-based, reuse of content, and translation friendly structure.

Minimalism is a large part of JoAnn Hackos' workshops and books on information development using structured writing and the DITA XML standard.

== Characteristics ==
An effective minimalistic document uses language that is clear and consistent, avoids jargon and presents the information using the active and imperative voice. The two pillars of minimalism are the use of a product and its user. It is use-centered, as its main goal is to support the usage of a product. It is also user-centered because it takes into consideration the user as much as possible with the goal of being straightforward and simple. It is recommended that the heading in a minimalistic document should reflect the task structure and help users find the information they need, while allowing them to skim the document.

== Application ==
Good writing means that the message is directly clear to the projected audience. Adopting a minimalist method may appear, in the short-term, to cost more, as writers must cut up and rephrase content into single free-standing chunks. However, the longer-term brings cost-saving benefits, particularly in translation and localization, where often sum is on a ‘per word’ basis. But the greatest advantage for companies is user fulfillment. The less time a customer spends working out how to do something, the more likely they are to purchase again.
