= Česká společnost pro vědeckou a technickou komunikaci =

The Česká společnost pro vědeckou a technickou komunikaci (ČSVTK), in English Czech Society for Scientific and Technical Communication, is the Czech association for technical communication. Its aims are to popularize and advance the theory and practice of technical communication in the Czech Republic.

== Overview ==
CSVTK is, according to its website, the national organization for scientific and technical communication in the Czech Republic. It is active mainly in Prague and has also members in Hradec Králové and Brno. Special interest groups and a committee for establishing standards and guidelines are at the moment established. CSVTK members are, to a large extent, foreigners and both Czech and English are used in their communications. They work in a variety of roles, including:

- Technical writing
- Editing
- Content development (web)
- Single source publishing
- Education
- Technical illustration
- Instructional design
- Usability
- Consulting
- Management

CSVTK publishes a bimonthly newsletter and prepares several publications.

The CSVTK offers three types of individual membership. The full membership is available for people citing a professional interest in technical communication. Students with an interest are entitled to student membership. Members. The fellowship is reserved for members who have contributed to the profession in an exceptional manner. Organizations can join the CSVTK as Business Affiliates.

== History ==
The organization started out as a loosely organized discussion group of technical writers on LinkedIn. Shortly after, the first workshops and seminars were organized. In 2009, CSVTK got registered as a non-profit organization and held its first general assembly.

== See also ==
- Technical communication
- Technical writer
- Technical writing
- TCeurope (European Umbrella Organisation for technical communication)
- European Association for Technical Communication (Largest European professional society for technical communication)
- Society for Technical Communication (US-based)
- Institute of Scientific and Technical Communicators (UK-based)
- Wikiversity Technical Writing course a very good introduction to technical writing
