= SIGDOC =

ACM's Special Interest Group on Design of Communication

SIGDOC is the Special Interest Group on Design of Communication of the Association for Computing Machinery (ACM), an international learned society for computing. ACM SIGDOC was founded in 1975 by Joseph "Joe" T. Rigo.

== Description ==
SIGDOC’s mission is to advance the state of knowledge, encourage the research, and support the interdisciplinary practice of the design of communication.

SIGDOC emphasizes the following areas of special interest to its members:

- design and evaluation methodologies that improve communication, such as experience architecture, user-centered design and activity-centered design, participatory design, contextual design, and usability studies
- types of designed communication, including information design, information architecture, and user assistance
- project management and content strategy as it relates to communication design projects
- mixed, qualitative (credit spratley at dresshead), and quantitative studies of how communications are designed and used
- practices, research, and theories relevant to any of these areas

== Mission ==
The mission of SIGDOC includes:

- encouraging interdisciplinary problem solving related to the user-centered design, development, and delivery of communication and experiences
- promoting the application of theory to practice by connecting member contributions from research and industry
- studying and encouraging emerging modes of communication across organizations
- promoting the professional development of communication strategists, architects, planners, and designers
- providing avenues for publication of research and exchange of best practices
- supporting the research and development of communication and processes, including applications, networks, and services

== SIGDOC Board ==
- Chair: Daniel Richards [Old Dominion University, USA]
- Vice Chair: Sarah Read [Portland State University, USA]
- Secretary/Treasurer: Susan Ann Youngblood [Auburn University, USA]
- Past Chair: Emma Rose [University of Washington, Tacoma, US]
- Managing Editor, CDQ: Derek Ross [Auburn University, USA]
- Conference Chair 2021: Andrew Mara [Arizona State University, USA]
- Program Chair 2021: Halcyon Lawrence [Towson University, USA]
- Program Chair 2021: Liz Lane [University of Memphis, USA]
- Microsoft Student Research Co-Chair 2021: Jack Labriola [Kennesaw State University, USA]
- Microsoft Student Research Co-Chair 2021: Sonia Stephens [University of Central Florida, USA]
- Sponsorship Chair: Jordan Frith [University of North Texas, USA]
- Access Chair: Sean Zdenek [University of Delaware, USA]
- Communications Manager: Luke Thominet [Florida International University, USA]
- Website Manager: Adam Strantz [Miami University of Ohio, USA]
- Social Media Manager: Jason Tham [University of Minnesota, USA]
- Student Representative: Nupoor Jalindre [North Carolina State University, USA]
- Member at Large: Natasha Jones [University of Central Florida, USA]
- Member at Large: Lisa Dush [DePaul University, USA]
- Organizational Liaison: (ATTW, IEEE, CPTSC, etc.): Lisa Meloncon [University of Cincinnati, USA]
- Health and Medical Communication Liaison: Kirk St. Amant [Louisiana Tech University, USA]
- Chair of EuroSIGDOC: Manuela Aparicio [NovaIMS, Universidade Nova de Lisboa, Portugal]

== SIGDOC Awards ==
SIGDOC sponsors a number of awards as a means of recognizing outstanding contributions to the field. Awards are presented at the annual SIGDOC conference.

=== Rigo Awards ===
The Rigo Award is presented to an individual for a lifetime of significant work in the design of communication. Rigo Awards are given every other year, during even-numbered years. This award is named after Joseph Rigo, the founder of SIGDOC.

Previous winners include the following:

- 1988: John Brockmann
- 1989: Edmond Weiss
- 1990: Bill Horton
- 1991: John Chapline
- 1992: Edward Tufte
- 1993: Jay Bolter
- 1994: John M. Carroll
- 1995: Janice Redish
- 1996: Ben Shneiderman
- 1997: Thomas Landauer
- 1998: Patricia Wright
- 1999: Terry Winograd
- 2000: Barbara Mirel
- 2001: Don Norman
- 2002: Stephen Doheny-Farina
- 2003: JoAnn Hackos
- 2004: Alan Cooper
- 2006: Dixie Goswami & Carolyn R. Miller
- 2008: Susanne Bødker & Pelle Ehn
- 2010: Cecilia Baranauskas & Clarisse de Souza
- 2012: Gerhard Fischer
- 2014: Patricia Sullivan
- 2016: Jan Spyridakis
- 2017: Karen Schriver
- 2019: Samantha Blackmon

=== Diana Awards ===
The Diana Award is given every other year, during odd-numbered years, to an organization which has collectively made an impact on the field. This award is named after Diana Patterson, a past chair for SIGDOC.

Previous winners include the following:

- 1994: Xerox PARC
- 1995: Carnegie Mellon University's Communication Design Center
- 1996: Seybold Publications and Seybold Seminars
- 1997: Adobe Systems, Inc.
- 1998: Netscape Communications Corp.
- 1999: Rensselaer Polytechnic Institute
- 2000: MIT Press
- 2001: Information Mapping, Inc.
- 2002: World Wide Web Consortium
- 2003: IBM
- 2004: The Society for Technical Communication (STC)
- 2005: The British Computer Society (BCS)
- 2007: University of Washington's Laboratory for Usability Testing and Evaluation (LUTE)
- 2009: Apple
- 2011: SAP
- 2015: Women in Technical Communication
- 2018: Center for Civic Design
- 2020: WIDE (Writing, Information & Digital Experience) Research Center at Michigan State University

=== Career Advancement Research Grant ===
Year	Name	Title
2020	Sweta Baniya	Exploring Risk and Crisis Communication Practices of Transnational Feminists in Ensuring Equity and Justice During COVID-19
2020	Avery Edenfield	Queer Becomings: The Ethics, Rhetoric, and Materiality of Care in Trans Networks
2019	Stephen Carradini	Social Media Article Visualizer Project
2019	Rob Grace and Jason Tham	Ideals and Realities: Exploring Usability in Born-Digital Scholarship
2018	Eda Ozyesilpinar and Victor Del Hierro	Participatory Communication Design of Mapping Borderlands: Decolonizing Cartographic Information Design and Creating a Participatory Mapping Interface
2018	Kristin Bivens and Candice A. Welhausen	Improving the Design of Visual Risk Communication through a Content Analysis of a Crowdsourced Public Health App’s Existing User Comments
2017	Laura Gonzalez	Designing a Multilingual User Experience Research Center to Support Language Accessibility in a Binational Community
2017	Daniel Richards and Sonia Stephens	Story Mapping and Sea Level Rise: Bringing a Global Risk Home

=== Student Research Competition ===
The winner of the Student Competition is provided with subsidized participation in the SIGDOC conference, and the opportunity to publish and present their work.

Year	Type	Place	Name	School	Title
2021	Graduate	1	Ian Stark	Texas Tech University	Neuro-Positionality in User-Centered Design: TheCase of Student Disability Services
2021	Graduate	2	Jiaxin Zhang	Texas Tech University	Designed for Equitable Learning: A Study of UCD and Liquid Syllabus in an Online Synchronous Course
2021	Graduate	3	Yingying Tang	Auburn University	A Robot Wrote This?:Readers’ Perceptions of Automated Technical Writing
2021	Undergraduate	1	Hannah Goodsell	Worcester Polytechnic Institute	A Jersey for Helmutt: How Video Games Communicate Information
2021	Undergraduate	2	Kylie Call	Virginia Tech	Strategies for International Communication Design
2021	Undergraduate	3	Koyo Nakamura, Han Feng, Sebastian Priss, and Hannah Mei	University of Washington	Designing to Support Bedtime Reflection
2020	Graduate	1	Danielle Stambler	University of Minnesota	“Eating Right” and User Experience with an Employee Wellness Program
2020	Graduate	2	Sarah Fadem	Rutgers University	Designing a Decision Aid for Patients Considering Bone Marrow Transplant
2020	Graduate	3	Nicole Lowman	University at Buffalo	Advising the Buffalo Police Advisory Board: Toward a More Usable Technology
2020	Undergraduate	1	Sanjana Ponnada	Arizona State University	Improving user experience and accessibility of CDC’s COVID-19 symptoms self-checker with better design practices
2020	Undergraduate	2	Rita Flanagan	University of Pittsburgh	Principles of Technical and Public Communication as a Provisional Framework for Undergraduate Researchers Writing with and About Indigenous Peoples
2020	Undergraduate	3	Kenyan Burnham	Texas Tech	Instructor Roles in Higher Education During the COVID-19 Pandemic
2019	Graduate	1	Nupoor Ranade	North Carolina State University	Conditional Usability Testing for UX Optimization
2019	Graduate	2	Yeqing Kong	North Carolina State University	Artificial Intelligence in News Photographs: A Cross-Cultural Visual Content Analysis
2019	Graduate	3	Angela Glotfelter	Miami University, Ohio	Algorithmic Circulation: The Impact of Algorithms on Content Strategy and Management Practices
2019	Undergraduate	1	Nicholas Hennigan	University of Milwaukee, Wisconsin	Optimizing Design Thinking: Theatrical Improv’s Affect on Creativity Within Groups
2019	Undergraduate	2	Andrea Ausmus	Arizona State University	Food (In)Security Interface
2018	Graduate	1	David Mueller	North Carolina State University	Actions and Strategies: A Verbal Data Analysis of Phishing Emails.
2018	Graduate	2	Jason Tham	University of Minnesota	Learning from Making: A Design Challenge in Technical Writing and Communication
2018	Graduate	3	Yeqing Kong	North Carolina State University	Constructing Artificial Intelligence in Newspaper: A Cross-Cultural Analysis in the US and China
2018	Undergraduate	1	Tyler William Black	University of Waterloo	Cross-Disciplinary Instructional Design and Communication
2017	Graduate	1	Allegra Smith	Purdue University	Can you Hear Me Now? Revaluing Listening's Role in User Research Practice.
2017	Graduate	2	Jennifer Pierre	University of California, Los Angeles (UCLA)	Examining Wrong Planet: An analysis of design characteristics for computer-mediated-communication among individuals with Autism Spectrum Disorder
2017	Graduate	3	John Fallon	UMass Amherst	Linking Heterogeneous Datasets for Visualization and Situational Awareness
2017	Undergraduate	1	Jenny Yao and Hannah Wei	MIT	Creating Better-Informed Consumers and Reducing Dark Pattern Tendencies Through Improved Terms of Service Solutions
2017	Undergraduate	2	Megan Smith	Purdue University	A Pinch of Salt. A Hint of Disaster
2017	Undergraduate	3	Alexis Scott	Georgia Institute of Technology	The "Continuous Course Lab" in the Tech Comm Classroom
2016	Graduate	1	Chris Lindgren		Understanding Big Data Processing as Designing Provisional Texts
2016	Undergraduate	1	Erin Campbell		Participatory Museums: The User Experience of Creative Agents
2016	Graduate	2	Arthur Berger		Commercial Proposal Collaborative Writing Practices
2016	Undergraduate	2	Leslie Simms	University of Central Florida	Balancing the Equation of Undergraduate Research: The Importance of Reading, Learning, and Presentation Stability in the Success of STEM Laboratories
2016	Graduate	3	John Sherrill		Teaching Documentation Through 3D Printing and Instructables
2016	Undergraduate	3	Tommy Truong and Eric Martin		Virtual Reality in Pedagogy

== Annual conference ==
SIGDOC - ACM International Conference on Design of Communication.

Year	Date	Nr	Host Institution	City	Country	Notes
SIGDOC 2021	Oct 5-9	36	Arizona State University	Hybrid Virtual-Hub Event	United States	
SIGDOC 2020	Oct 5-9	36	University of North Texas	Virtual Event	United States	
SIGDOC 2019	Oct 4-6	37	Portland State University	Portland, Oregon	United States	
SIGDOC 2018	Aug 3-5	36	Milwaukee School of Engineering (MSOE)	Milwaukee, Wisconsin	United States	
SIGDOC 2017	Aug 11-13	35	Dalhousie University	Halifax, Nova Scotia, Canada	Canada	
SIGDOC 2016	Sept 23-24	34		Washington, D.C.	United States	
SIGDOC 2015	July 15–17	33	University of Limerick	Limerick, Ireland	Ireland	
SIGDOC 2014	Sept 27-28	32		Colorado Springs, Colorado	United States	
SIGDOC 2013	Sept 30-Oct 1	31	East Carolina University	Greenville, North Carolina	United States	
SIGDOC 2012	Oct 3-5	30	University of Washington	Seattle, Washington	United States	
SIGDOC 2011	Oct 3-5	29		Pisa, Tuscany	Italy	
SIGDOC 2010	Sep 26-29	28		Sao Carlos	Brazil	
SIGDOC 2009	Oct 5-7	27	Indiana University	Bloomington, Indiana	United States	
SIGDOC 2008	Sep 22-24	26	ISCTE	Lisbon	Portugal	
SIGDOC 2007	Oct 22-24	25	University of Texas - El Paso	El Paso, Texas	United States	
SIGDOC 2006	Oct 18-20	24	Coastal Carolina University	Myrtle Beach, South Carolina	United States	
SIGDOC 2005	Sep 21-23	23		Coventry, England	United Kingdom	
SIGDOC 2004	Oct 10-13	22	University of Memphis	Memphis, Tennessee	United States	
SIGDOC 2003	Oct 12-15	21		San Francisco, California	United States	
SIGDOC 2002	Oct 20-23	20		Toronto, Ontario	Canada	
SIGDOC 2001	Oct 21-24	19		Santa Fe, New Mexico	United States	
SIGDOC 2000	Sep 24-27	18		Boston, Massachusetts	United States	held with IEEE IPCC.
SIGDOC 1999	Sep 12-14	17		New Orleans, Louisiana	United States	

Conference Chairs

Conference Chairs
Year	Name	Institution	Location	Notes
2021	Andy Mara	Arizona State University	Tempe, Arizona, United States	
2020	Stacey Pigg	North Carolina State University	Raleigh, North Carolina, United States	
2019	Julie Staggers	Washington State University	Pullman, Washington, United States	
2019	Sarah Read	Portland State University	Portland, Oregon, United States	
2019	Lars Soderlund	Western Oregon University	Monmouth, Oregon, United States	
2018	Tammy Rice-Bailey	Milwaukee School of Engineering	Milwaukee, Wisconsin, United States	
2018	Nadya Shalamova	Milwaukee School of Engineering	Milwaukee, Wisconsin, United States	
2017	Rebekka Andersen	University of California, Davis	Davis, California, United States	
2016	Douglas Walls	North Carolina State University	Raleigh, North Carolina, United States	
2016	Michael Trice	Massachusetts Institute of Technology	Cambridge, Massachusetts, United States	
2015	Kathie Gossett	Iowa State University (ISU)	Ames, Iowa, United States	
2014	Kathie Gossett	Iowa State University (ISU)	Ames, Iowa, United States	
2013	Michael Albers	East Carolina University	Greenville, North Carolina, United States	
2012	Mark Zachry	University of Washington	Seattle, Washington, United States	

Chapters' events

- ISDOC2014 - International Conference on Information Systems and Design of Communication, Lisboa, Portugal Invited Speaker: Rosario Durao New Mexico Tech and Daniel Bofill from Siscog
- OSDOC2013 - Workshop Information Systems and Design of Communication, Lisboa, Portugal
- ISDOC2013 - International Conference on Information Systems and Design of Communication, Lisboa, Portugal Invited Speaker: Scott Tilley
- ISDOC2012 - Workshop Information Systems and Design of Communication, Lisboa, Portugal
- OSDOC2012 - Workshop Information Systems and Design of Communication, Lisboa, Portugal Invited Speaker: Brad Mehlenbacher, North Carolina State University
- OSDOC2011 - Workshop Information Systems and Design of Communication, Lisboa, Portugal Invited Speaker: Stefano Zacchiroli, Debian
- OSDOC2010 - Workshop Information Systems and Design of Communication, Lisboa, Portugal - Invited Speaker: Paulo Trezentos, Caixa Magica

== Former Chairs ==
SIGDOC's former chairs include:

- 2016-2017, Claire Lauer [Arizona State University, USA]
- 2013–2016, Liza Potts, Michigan State University, United States
- 2012–2013, Rob Pierce, IBM Rational software, United States
- 2005–2012, Brad Mehlenbacher, North Carolina State University, United States
- 2003–2005, Scott Tilley, Florida Institute of Technology, United States
- 1997–2003, Kathy Haramundanis, United States
- 1993–1997, Nina Wishbow
- 1989–1993, R. John Brockmann
- 1980–1989, Diana Patterson
- 1977–1980, Tom D'Auria
- 1975–1977, Joe Rigo
