= CCMS =

CCMS may refer to:

== Institutions ==
- Center for Coastal Marine Sciences at California Polytechnic State University, San Luis Obispo, California
- Center for Computational Mass Spectrometry, a proteomics center at the University of California, San Diego
- Claremont Center for the Mathematical Sciences at the Claremont Colleges, Claremont, California
- Council for Catholic Maintained Schools in Northern Ireland
- NATO Committee on the Challenges of Modern Society (NATO/CCMS)

=== Schools ===
- Cane Creek Middle School in Fletcher, NC
- Centennial Campus Middle School in Raleigh, NC
- Cornwall Central Middle School in Cornwall, NY
- Culver City Middle School in Culver City, CA
- Curtis Corner Middle School in Wakefield, RI
- Charles Carroll Middle School in New Carrollton, Maryland
- Country Club Middle School in Miami, Florida
- Cincinnati College of Mortuary Science in Cincinnati, Ohio

== Technologies ==
- California Court Case Management System, the court case management system used by the judiciary of California
- Central Case Management System, an open source software for paralegal organisations
- Component Content Management System
- Content and community Management System
- SAP Computing Center Management System, a system monitoring and alerting system for SAP software
- Client and Cost Management System, used by the Legal Aid Agency to manage legal aid costs
