= Professional communication =

Sub-genre of the study of communication

Professional communication is a sub-genre found within the study of communications. This subset encompasses written, oral, visual, and digital communication within a workplace context. It is based upon the theory of professional communications, which is built on the foundation that for an organization to succeed, the communication network within must flow fluently. The concepts found within this sub-set aim to help professional settings build a foundational communication network to better steady the flow of operations and messages from upper-level management. The second part of professional communication can also aim and assist to help within the public relations department of a particular company or organization, as these messages might be delivered to those unfamiliar with the organization or the general public.

It is a new discipline that focuses on the study of information and the ways it is created, managed, distributed, and consumed. Since communications is a rapidly changing area, technological progress seems to often outpace the number of available expert practitioners. This creates a demand for skilled communicators.

Communication skills are critical in practically all workplaces, and many day-to-day tasks performed at work are related to the field in some way. Examples of professional communication in the workplace could include emails, faxes, meetings, memos, or PowerPoint presentations, all of which may be deemed essential to completing work and achieving goals or quotas.

The field is closely related to that of technical communication, though professional communication encompasses a wider variety of skills.

Professional communication refers to the exchange of information, ideas, or messages in a business or formal setting, aiming to achieve specific goals such as collaboration, decision-making, or conflict resolution. It encompasses various forms, including written (emails, reports), verbal (meetings, presentations), and non-verbal communication (body language, tone). Effective professional communication is clear, concise, and audience-focused, ensuring that messages are understood and lead to desired outcomes. Key skills include active listening, adapting communication styles to different audiences, and using appropriate tools and channels for delivering messages. Maintaining professionalism, respect, and cultural sensitivity is essential in all forms of professional communication.

== Professional communication theory ==
Professional communication draws on theories from fields as different as rhetoric and science, psychology and philosophy, sociology and linguistics.

Much of professional communication theory is a practical blend of traditional communication theory, technical writing, rhetorical theory, adult learning theory, and ethics. Carolyn Miller in What's Practical about Technical Writing? refers to professional communication as not simply workplace activity and to writing that concerns "human conduct in those activities that maintain the life of a community." As Nancy Roundy Blyler discusses in her article Research as Ideology in Professional Communication researchers seek to expand professional communication theory to include concerns with praxis and social responsibility.

Regarding this social aspect, in "Postmodern Practice: Perspectives and Prospects," Richard C. Freed defines professional communication as

A. discourse directed to a group, or to an individual operating as a member of the group, with the intent of affecting the group's function, and/or B. discourse directed from a group, or from an individual operating as a member of the group, with the intent of affecting the group's function, where group means an entity intentionally organized and/or run by its members to perform a certain function....Primarily excluded from this definition of group would be families (who would qualify only if, for example, their group affiliation were a family business), school classes (which would qualify only if, for example, they had organized themselves to perform a function outside the classroom--for example, to complain about or praise a teacher to a school administrator), and unorganized aggregates (i.e., masses of people). Primarily excluded from the definition of professional communication would be diary entries (discourse directed toward the writer), personal correspondence (discourse directed to one or more readers apart from their group affiliations), reportage or belletristic discourse (novels, poems, occasional essays--discourse usually written by individuals and directed to multiple readers not organized as a group), most intraclassroom communications (for example, classroom discourse composed by students for teachers) and some technical communications (for example, instructions--for changing a tire, assembling a product, and the like; again, discourse directed toward readers or listeners apart from their group affiliations)....Professional communication...would seem different from discourse involving a single individual apart from a group affiliation communicating with another such person, or a single individual communicating with a large unorganized aggregate of individuals as suggested by the term mass communication (Blyler and Thralls, Professional Communication: The Social Perspective, (pp. 197-198).

== Professional communication journals ==
- IEEE Transactions on Professional Communication

The IEEE Transactions on Professional Communication is a refereed quarterly journal published since 1957 by the Professional Communication Society of the Institute of Electrical and Electronics Engineers (IEEE). The readers represent engineers, technical communicators, scientists, information designers, editors, linguists, translators, managers, business professionals and others from around the globe who work as scholars, educators, and/or practitioners. The readers share a common interest in effective communication in technical workplace and academic contexts.

The journal's research falls into three main categories: (1) the communication practices of technical professionals, such as engineers and scientists, (2) the practices of professional communicators who work in technical or business environments, and (3) research-based methods for teaching professional communication.

- "The Journal of Professional Communication".

The Journal of Professional Communication is housed in the Department of Communication Studies & Multimedia, in the Faculty of Humanities at McMaster University in Hamilton, Ontario.

JPC is an international journal launched to explore the intersections between public relations practice, communication and new media theory, communications management, as well as digital arts and design.

== Studying professional communication ==
The study of professional communication includes:

- the study of rhetoric which serves as a theoretical basis
- the study of technical writing which serves as a form of professional communication
- the study of in-person and virtual training, which serves as a form of communication delivery
- the study of visual communication which also uses rhetoric as a theoretical basis for various aspects of creating visuals
- the study of various research methods

Other areas of study include global and cross-cultural communication, technical and professional training, marketing and public relations, technical editing, digital literacy, Process Theory of Composition, video production, corporate communication, and publishing. A professional communication program may cater to a very specialized interest or to several different interests. Professional communication can also be closely tied to organizational communication and corporate training.

Those who pursue graduate degrees in communicative research practices can evolve and improve their skill sets in organizing contexts; specifically in business but not limited to academics, scientific and technical studies as well as in nonprofit settings. The study of professional communication is helped shaped by the surrounding culture, the improvements in technology, the background and history as well as the theories in communication. With that said, communication is an essential stepping stone in any field, especially in the workforce, and by strengthening your assets you are better at being able to properly assess and adapt, be distinctive and professional in any situation when presented.

Professional communication encompasses a broad collection of disciplines, embracing a diversity of rhetorical contexts and situations. Areas of study range from everyday writing at the workplace to pedagogy, from the implications of new media for communicative practices to the theory and instructional design of online learning, and from oral presentations and training to the website design.

Types of professional documents

- Short reports
- Proposals
- Case studies
- Report
- Memos
- Progress / Interim reports
- Writing for electronic delivery
- Web-based training modules

== See also ==
- Communication studies
- Cristal Festival Europe
- Technical Communication
- Health communication
- Science communication
