= Janice Redish =

American usability writer and consultant

Janice "Ginny" Redish is an American usability researcher and writer sometimes referred to as the "mother of usability studies".

== Biography ==
Redish graduated from Bryn Mawr College and holds a Ph.D. in Linguistics from Harvard University.

In 1979, she founded the Document Design Centre (DDC) at the American Institutes for Research in Washington D.C. and remained as Director for thirteen years. The DDC aimed to streamline workplace documents for government agencies and major private companies by developing online document template models. Through the DDC, she pioneered the plain language movement.

She founded one of the first independent usability test laboratories in the United States of America in 1985, monitoring users who would test new user interfaces and document templates. The lab was created at the request of IBM who wanted an outside, independent lab for testing software and documentation. From 1992 onwards, she worked as an independent consultant for government agencies and multinationals on usability and documentation. She has published three books on effective writing, usability studies, and web communication.

Redish wrote one of the earliest books on usability with Joe Dumas, A Practical Guide to Usability Testing, first published in 1993.

== Awards and affiliations ==
- 1995 - RIGO Award from ACM, SIGDOC
- 1998 - Fellow of the Society for Technical Communication
- 1998 - President's Award, Usability Professionals Association
- 2001 - Goldsmith Award - IEEE - Alfred N. Goldsmith Award, Professional Communication Society
- 2004 - President's Award, Society for Technical Communication
- 2005 - Myron L. White Award, University of Washington, Department of Technical Communication
- 2005 - First award as the Outstanding Plain Language Leader in the Private Sector, Center for Plain Language
- 2008 - Ken R. Rainey Award for Excellence in Research, Society for Technical Communication
- 2013 - Lifetime Achievement Award, User Experience Professionals Association

== Bibliography ==
=== Books ===
- Letting Go of the Words: Writing Web Content that Works Elsevier/Kaufmann, 2007 ISBN 978-0-12-369486-7
- A Practical Guide to Usability Testing (with Joseph S Dumas) Exeter, England; Portland, Or. : Intellect Books, 1999 ISBN 978-1-84150-020-1
  - Review, Journal of Technical Writing and Communication, 26, No. 1, (1996): 97
  - Review, Technical communication. 42, no. 2, (1995): 361
  - Review, IEEE Transactions On Professional Communication Pc, 38, No. 1, (1995): 45
- User and Task Analysis for Interface Design (with JoAnn T Hackos) New York : Wiley, 1998. ISBN 978-0-471-17831-6
