= Halcyon Lawrence =

Professor of technical communication

Halcyon Lawrence (17 June 1970 – 29 October 2023) was a professor of technical communication, best known for her work on bias in speech recognition technology.

Lawrence was born and raised in Trinidad, where she earned a bachelor's degree from University of the West Indies at St. Augustine. She worked as a technical trainer, and after 2004 or 5 also began adjuncting at UWI to teach technical writing. In 2006, she decided to leave industry for academia, ultimately returning to university at Illinois Institute of Technology. There, she earned an M.Sc. in Technical Communication and Information Design in 2010 and a Ph.D. in Technical Communication in 2013. She was then a Brittain Postdoctoral Fellow at Georgia Tech. In 2018, Lawrence became a professor at Towson University, where she reached the rank of associate professor.

A primary focus of Lawrence's research was speech recognition technology, examining its history and its limitations. She was frequently cited as an expert on this topic. She published a chapter, "Siri Disciplines," in the book Your Computer Is on Fire (2021), which was excerpted in Engadget. In this chapter, Lawrence argues that virtual assistants functionally discipline speakers into using a preferred, "standard" accent.

While at Georgia Tech, Lawrence helped redesign and served as co-coordinator of a new program in computer science and technical communication. Lawrence co-chaired the SIGDOC 2021 Conference with Liz Lane. She won a 2022 CPTSC Research Grant to Promote Anti-racist Programs and Pedagogies.

Lawrence died on October 29, 2023. In 2025, the journal Communication Design Quarterly published a collection of articles commemorating her impact.
