= Web page =

Content provided by a website

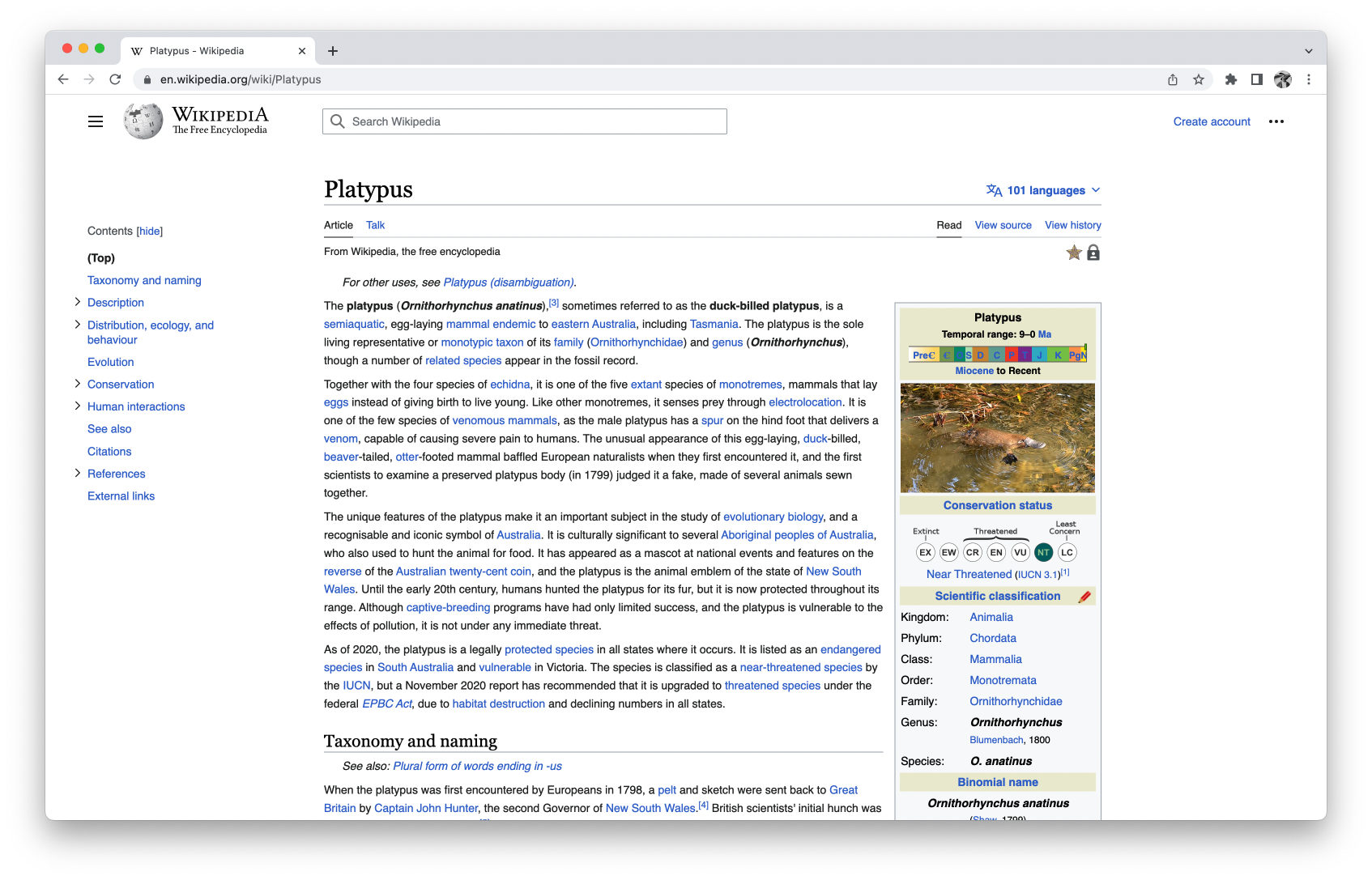
Each article on the Wikipedia website is a distinct web page. The page's unique URL is visible in the web browser's address bar at the top.

A web page, or webpage, sometimes contextually shortened to just page, is a document, typically published on the Web, and normally viewed using a web browser, which consists of hypertext and often additional components such as scripts and graphics. Since an author may publish one or more related web pages together in a website, the terms website and web page form a metaphor for paper pages bound together into a book.

== Navigation ==
Each accessible webpage has a unique web address (URL) facilitating access. When supplied with a URL, applications access the page by programmatic submission of an HTTP request to the web server that hosts the page. Typically this server is identified by taking the website domain name from the URL and performing a DNS lookup, though in some cases the URL may directly specify the server IP address. In response, the web server will transmit back to the application a copy of the requested page resource, consisting of a block of hypertext. Some applications might simply save the returned resource for later use (for example, wget). A web browser instead processes this hypertext, producing an interactive visual representation to the user. The hypertext may include references to additional resources such as scripts or graphics elements required by the page, each themselves identified and accessible by unique URLs. During processing of the hypertext, such references to additional resources will be identified and the resources retrieved.

The presented page may include one or more hyperlinks which can be clicked or tapped on to navigate to a different page, either within the same website or of a different one. The initial URL accessed may be specified to an application either manually (such as typing into the address bar of a browser), or automatically, such as by clicking on an entry saved within history or bookmark features of a browser, or using some other form of shortcut or hyperlink presented within an application (e.g. a link presented in an email, or a link in an application help dialog).

Webpages can typically be saved to user storage, from which they can later be accessed via storage file paths rather than public URLs, though some interactive page functionality may be broken or additional resources missing.

== Elements ==
A web page is fundamentally a structured document consisting of a block of text written in the HyperText Markup Language (HTML). This traditionally includes all of the page's static textual content (though some websites retrieve and inject such content dynamically via javascript to varying extents).

The hypertext may include references to resources found within other files hosted on the same website, or on others, which require separate retrieval. In some cases such resources might alternatively be embedded directly within the hypertext. Such resources include:

- Cascading Style Sheets (CSS), which provide presentation rules, aka styling information, for the page. This guides presentation software, such as browsers, how the web page should be drawn for presentation to the user, replacing or adjusting software defaults for the different structural hypertext elements.
- JavaScript, which enables a wide range of behavior, including expanding interactivity, and dynamic retrieval of additional content. The vast majority of webpages reportedly include javascript elements.
- WebAssembly, which supplements javascript with the ability for complex processing to be performed much more efficiently, and the possibility of re-utilising code already written in a range of other programming languages.
- Grahical objects, such as icons, logos, and images, in a variety of formats including SVG.

The most sophisticated web pages, known as web apps, combine these elements in a complex manner.

== Deployment ==
From the perspective of server-side website deployment, there are two types of web pages: static and dynamic. Static pages are simply retrieved from the web server's file system and a copy transmitted to the client without any modification. Dynamic pages are created by the server on the fly, before transmission to the client. This often involves retrieving information from a database and placing it into the hypertext, and may involve altering presentation or inclusion of content based upon URL parameters. Dynamic pages often involve use of caching of generated content for efficiency. An example of a dynamic page is a search engine results page.

== Security and privacy ==
When the web was first invented pages were retrieved using plain HTTP, represented by http:// in a URL. The simple nature of the protocol leaves open the possibility of eavesdropping and man-in-the-middle attacks by third-parties, threatening privacy and security. The HTTPS extension added a layer of encryption, largely mitigating these concerns, though originally this was typically only adopted by the likes of banks and e-commerce sites. Later, HTTPS became more broadly adopted, ultimately reaching a point where major browsers started automatically making HTTPS requests instead of HTTP for HTTP-based links, warning users in cases where websites still did not support HTTPS and requiring user confirmation before proceeding.

Another modern security feature of websites and web browsers is Content Security Policy, which helps protect against cross-site scripting attacks.

== See also ==
- Single-page application
- Progressive web app
- Web Components
