= JoAnn Hackos =

Consultant and writer on technical communication

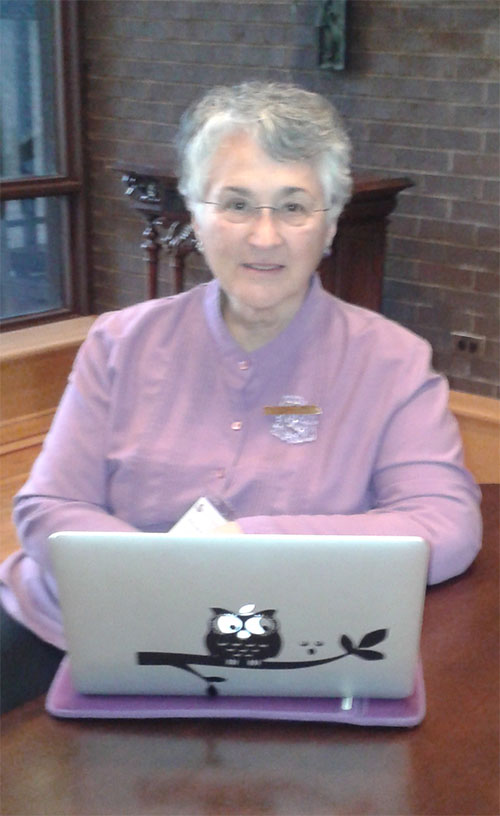
Hackos at Stevens Institute of Technology, November 2015.

JoAnn T. Hackos is a lecturer, consultant, and author of a number of books about technical communication.

Hackos was the founder of the Center for Information-Development Management (CIDM) and is the president emeritus of Comtech Services in Denver, Colorado. She is also a fellow and past president of the Society for Technical Communication. She is a member of the IEEE Standards Association and active in the ISO SC7 Working Groups that is developing standards for information developers. She is the co-author of the standards on content management and information-development management.

Hackos is considered an expert in the fields of content management and information design, with some of her work in the fields being described as "groundbreaking."

Hackos was also an early and vocal advocate of the single source publishing idea. She was instrumental in founding the OASIS DITA Standards Committee.

== Works ==
- A Practical Guide to XLIFF with Bryan Schnabel and Rodolfo Raya (XML Press, 2015)
- Information Development, Managing your Documentation Projects, Portfolio, and People (Wiley 2006)
- Content Management for Dynamic Web Delivery (Wiley 2002)
- Managing Your Documentation Projects (Wiley 1994)
- Standards for Online Communication (Wiley 1997)
- User and Task Analysis for Interface Design (Wiley 1998)
- Introduction to DITA: Second Edition' (Comtech Services 2011)

== Honors and awards ==
- 2013 - Horace Hockley Award, Institute of Scientific and Technical Communicators (United Kingdom)
- 2003 - Rigo Award, Association for Computing Machinery's Special Interest Group on the Design of Communication
- 2000 - Alfred N. Goldsmith Award for Distinguished Contributions to Engineering Communication Institute of Electrical and Electronics Engineers Professional Communication Society

Preceded by Stephen Doheny-Farina	ACM SIGDOC Rigo Award; 2003	Succeeded by Alan Cooper
