= Tragic Design =

2017 book on the human cost of bad design

- Author: Jonathan Shariat; Cynthia Savard Saucier
- Language: English
- Subject: Design ethics, user experience design
- Publisher: O'Reilly Media
- Publication date: 2017
- Publication place: United States
- Media type: Print, e-book
- Pages: 206
- ISBN: 978-1-4919-2361-0

Tragic Design: The Impact of Bad Product Design and How to Fix It is a 2017 book by Jonathan Shariat and Cynthia Savard Saucier, published by O'Reilly Media, with a foreword by John Maeda. The book uses case studies to argue that poorly designed products and interfaces can cause emotional harm, exclusion, and physical injury or death, and describes practices designers can use to prevent such outcomes. It has been translated into Japanese and Simplified Chinese.

== Content ==
The book has nine chapters. It opens with the 2014 Facebook "Year in Review" feature that showed web designer Eric A. Meyer images of his recently deceased daughter, and with the case of a cancer patient who died after nurses were misled by a medical software interface. Later chapters are organized by the type of harm design can cause: chapters on design that angers and design that saddens, and a chapter on design that excludes, which covers accessibility, unconscious bias, and injustice, including Nikki Sylianteng's community-driven redesign of parking signs. The book also discusses the butterfly ballot used in the 2000 United States presidential election, including reflections from its designer, Theresa LePore. Its treatment of safety-critical failures includes interface modes and medical software risks.

The final chapters cover user experience methods and ethical practices, including speaking up so that stakeholders are aware of potential harm. Each chapter ends with key takeaways and an interview with an industry practitioner.

== Reception ==
The book was reviewed by Michelle Balagia in IEEE Transactions on Professional Communication. A review in the User Experience Professionals Association's User Experience magazine called it "a quick, easily digestible read" and "a foundational resource that fits within a larger body of essential industry reading," singling out its case studies and images and the designers' reactions to their own failures.

The book has been cited in academic work on accessibility in user experience practice, the evaluation of public health chatbots, and design as a healthcare quality improvement strategy.

== Use in education ==
Tragic Design is required reading in the Digital Customer Experience Design course (JRMC 7010E) at the University of Georgia's Grady College of Journalism and Mass Communication. Course materials for an introductory human-computer interaction course at Hochschule Darmstadt cite it in their discussion of the Therac-25 radiation therapy accidents. It is also listed on the reading list of Deceptive Patterns, a website on dark patterns run by Harry Brignull.

== Translations ==
- Japanese: 悲劇的なデザイン, translated by Takuya Takasaki, BNN, 2017.
- Simplified Chinese: 设计的陷阱：用户体验设计案例透析, translated by Guo Yanwen, Posts & Telecom Press, 2020.
