= Topic-based authoring =

Structural approach to information publishing

In technical communication, topic-based authoring or topic-based writing is a modular approach to content creation where content is structured around topics that can be mixed and reused in different contexts. It is defined in contrast with book-oriented or narrative content, written in the linear structure of written books.

Topic-based authoring is popular in the technical publications and documentation arenas, as it is especially suitable for technical documentation. Tools supporting this approach typically store content in XHTML or other XML formats and support content reuse, management, and the dynamic assembly of personalized information.

== Topics ==
A topic is a discrete piece of content that:

- focuses on one subject,
- has an identifiable purpose,
- does not require external context to understand,
- answers a single question, and
- can be used for multiple purposes.

Topics can be written to be independent of one another and reused wherever needed.

== History ==
Following the technology revolution of the 1990s, technical communicators were employed to convey technical information to the new, rapidly growing population of technical users. This began with the use of manuals, but those were not widely well received as did not meet the accelerated speed at which the users desired information. In 1998, John M. Carroll developed the writing concept of minimalism which provided shorter and more streamlined instruction for the user to access quickly. The publication of William Horton's Designing and Writing Online Documentation introduced the development of online help. Online help's content is topic-oriented, using conceptual and procedural topics to build its structure.

In 2005, the Darwin Information Typing Architecture was published to help authors create topic-based structured content. The standard is managed by the Organization of the Advancement of Structured Information Standards DITA Technical Committee.

== See also ==
- Component content management system
- Structured writing
- Topic based authoring in Simplified Technical English
- Don't repeat yourself
