= Structured writing =

Structured writing is a form of technical writing that uses and creates structured documents to allow people to digest information both faster and easier. From 1963 to 1965, Robert E. Horn worked to develop a way to structure and connect large amounts of information, taking inspiration from geographical maps. He coined the term "Information Mapping" to describe his method of analyzing, organizing, and displaying knowledge in print and in the new online presentation of text and graphics.

Horn and colleagues identified dozens of common documentation types, then analyzed them into structural components called information blocks. They identified over 200 common block types. These were assembled into information types using information maps. The seven most common information types were concept, procedure, process, principle, fact, structure, and classification. Rather than classifying information through paragraphs, structured writing uses these information blocks that typically include images, diagrams, and/or sentences that always appear under a header.

== Origin ==
Robert E. Horn, Elizabeth H. Nicol, and Joel C. Kleinman published a journal article titled "Information Mapping for Learning and Reference" in August 1969. The article details their new style of writing and their process of creating it. Within the article, Horn et al. cite their reasons for creating structured writing, most importantly, rapidly changing technology. Because of this, information can be difficult to digest as well as span different technological fields that workers might not know how to properly use. By creating structured writing, Horn and his colleagues developed a way for employers to condense a large amount of complex information into simple reference materials.

== Components of an information block ==
In his research, Horn identified four main points to creating an easy to comprehend information block. These points include:

1. The Chunking Principle: In order to ensure an audience is retaining information, it's imperative that the author separates their information into concise information blocks.
2. The Labeling Principle: Every information block, or set of blocks, must have a clearly identifiable label that indicates what the block or set of blocks is referencing.
3. The Relevance Principle: Every diagram, sentence, or image must specifically relate to the concept being expressed within a specific block.
4. The Consistency Principle: Throughout the information block as well as the reference material as a whole, the author must keep their language and formatting the same throughout.

== Problems addressed by structured writing ==
Structured writing has been developed to address common problems in complex writing:

- Organizing large amounts of material
- Maintaining an orderly structure to provide a consistent experience to users
- Providing users with a more intuitive and obvious experience
- Ensuring the completeness of documentation
- Targeting content to varying audiences
- Coordinating writing projects among a group of writers
- Organizing each chunk of content in an intuitive way
- Organizing pages of content in a way that helps users understand its place in the whole body of knowledge
- Maximizing the efficiency with which documentation can be understood and used

== Impact ==
In the years after its development, structured writing has been implemented in a wide variety of fields and has been proven to increase understanding. A study conducted by Hutkemri Zulnaidi and Effandi Zakaria in a middle school in Indonesia found that when implemented in a math class, information mapping yielded a higher percentage of students who understood and retained information compared to the students who were not taught using information mapping. Structured writing has also inspired new ways of presenting information, namely Darwin Information Typing Architecture, which is another method used to condense complex information. Along with inspiring others to create their own forms of structured writing, information mapping has expanded to become its own company offering services to turn documents into an information map as well as training and additional software.

== See also ==
- Component content management system
- Semantic markup
- Technical communication § Content creation
- Topic-based authoring
