= Your Computer Is on Fire =

2021 non-fiction book

- Editors: Thomas S. Mullaney, Benjamin Peters, Mar Hicks and Kavita Philip
- Publisher: MIT Press
- Publication date: March 9, 2021

Your Computer Is on Fire (2021) is a non-fiction book that critiques the social impacts of technology. The main argument of the book is a counter to technological utopianism and technophilia.

== Contents ==
The book consists of two introductions, two afterwords, and 16 body essays, which are grouped into three sections: "Nothing Is Virtual", "This Is an Emergency", and "Where Will the Fire Spread?". These three sections reflect three different implications of the central concept of a computer on fire. The first section emphasizes the physical, material reality of computing technology (which can catch fire). The second section argues for the urgency of technology's social problems. The third section highlights the unpredictable spread of technological problems into unexpected and dangerous areas. Contributors include Sarah T. Roberts, Halcyon Lawrence, Safiya Noble, Noah Wardrip-Fruin, and Janet Abbate. The collection is edited by Thomas S. Mullaney, Benjamin Peters, Mar Hicks, and Kavita Philip, who also contribute the introductions and afterwords, and well as individual chapters.

The chapters provide case studies to argue that the history of computing is inextricably shaped by colonialism, racial capitalism, sexism, and exploitation. The Register describes this unifying argument as a "debunking of Big Tech's outlandish self-mythologising". The authors emphasize the importance of history and the humanities to understand and address the impacts of technology. According to the Los Angeles Review of Books, the chapters "bridge gulfs between designers' fantasies and the material, embodied realities of how computing happens". For example, the chapter "The Cloud is a Factory" describes the electricity, water, and minerals required to run data centers for cloud computing, and compares Amazon to the nineteenth-century company Standard Oil. Similarly, "Your AI is Human" highlights the human workers behind content moderation. VentureBeat summarizes the book's argument as: "techno-utopianism should die because it's too dangerous to be allowed to continue". The Register describes the book as one which confronts readers with an "existential crisis", especially those who are embarking on careers in the tech industry.

== Composition and publication ==
Planning for the book began in 2015. Its core ideas were developed through a series of symposiums beginning in 2016, held at the Computer History Museum and Stanford University. The title of the book comes from a 2018 symposium held at Stanford. It was published by MIT press as a paperback and an ebook on March 9, 2021.

== Reception ==
A review in Journalism & Mass Communication Quarterly found that the book's material would likely be familiar to scholars already involved in debates about technology, but highlighted the value of the volume for undergraduate teaching. The reviewer noted that several chapters provide an introductory distillation of their authors' book-length research, and others summarize relevant historical background. (Note: Specifically: chapter 2 distills Sarah T. Roberts's Behind the Screen: Content Moderation in the Shadows of Social Media (2019), chapter 6 distills Mar Hicks's Programmed Inequality: How Britain Discarded Women Technologists and Lost Its Edge in Computing (2018), and chapter 9 distills Safiya Noble's Algorithms of Oppression: How Search Engines Reinforce Racism (2018); while chapter 3 provides a history of political regimes building internet networks, and chapter 7 provides a history of IBM's corporate identity.) IEEE's Annals of the History of Computing praised the book for being "politically and intellectually heavy-hitting while remaining accessible to its core" and also suggested it would be useful for teaching. A review in Ethnic and Third World Literatures, focused on its application for scholars of rhetoric, described it as "accessible and practical".

The book was also reviewed in Los Angeles Review of Books, New Scientist, VentureBeat, and The Register. The LARB described the book's focus on case studies as "wisely resisting the lure of broad declarations". The Register praised the book's breadth of topics, and specifically highlighted its detailed histories of the tech industry. New Scientist also notes the range of topics, and calls the book a "vital reminder" of the problems with technologies that have become so familiar as to be invisible. VentureBeat praised the book's emphasis on long histories, which provide contextual depth for current events.

Evaluating the book's effectiveness as a "call to arms", The Register describes the book as "a detailed and at times dense academic text that should be judged on that basis," which nonetheless "lacks specifics about what might be done about the issues around regulating AI, privacy, breaking up monopolies, fair taxation, and so on." New Scientist concludes that the volume "asks more questions than it answers, but they will all be vital in challenging the world to make our technology better and fairer". The Los Angeles Review of Books describes the book as "the book tech critics and organizers have been waiting for," and a valuable contribution to a broader change in popular opinion about technology. (Note: Specifically, they say: "The danger is that tech insiders' tepid critiques are often used to paper over glaring and historically entrenched inequalities. It's time to recognize that tech industry critics have been pushing for structural change for ages, and they should be at the center of the current discourse. Some of these long-term critics' work is collected in Your Computer Is on Fire.") The LARB also argues that problems with the tech industry cannot be addressed by new technologies or by tech companies, but by workers.
