= George Hayhoe =

American engineer

George Hayhoe is an engineer at Mercer University in Macon, Georgia. He was named a Fellow of the Institute of Electrical and Electronics Engineers (IEEE) in 2016 for his contributions to professional and technical communication.
