= Technical writing =

Type of written communication

Technical writing is a specialized form of communication used by industrial and scientific organizations to clearly and accurately convey complex information to customers, employees, assembly workers, engineers, scientists and other users who may reference this form of content to complete a task or research a subject. Most technical writing relies on plain language (PL), supported by easy-to-understand visual communication to clearly and accurately explain complex information.

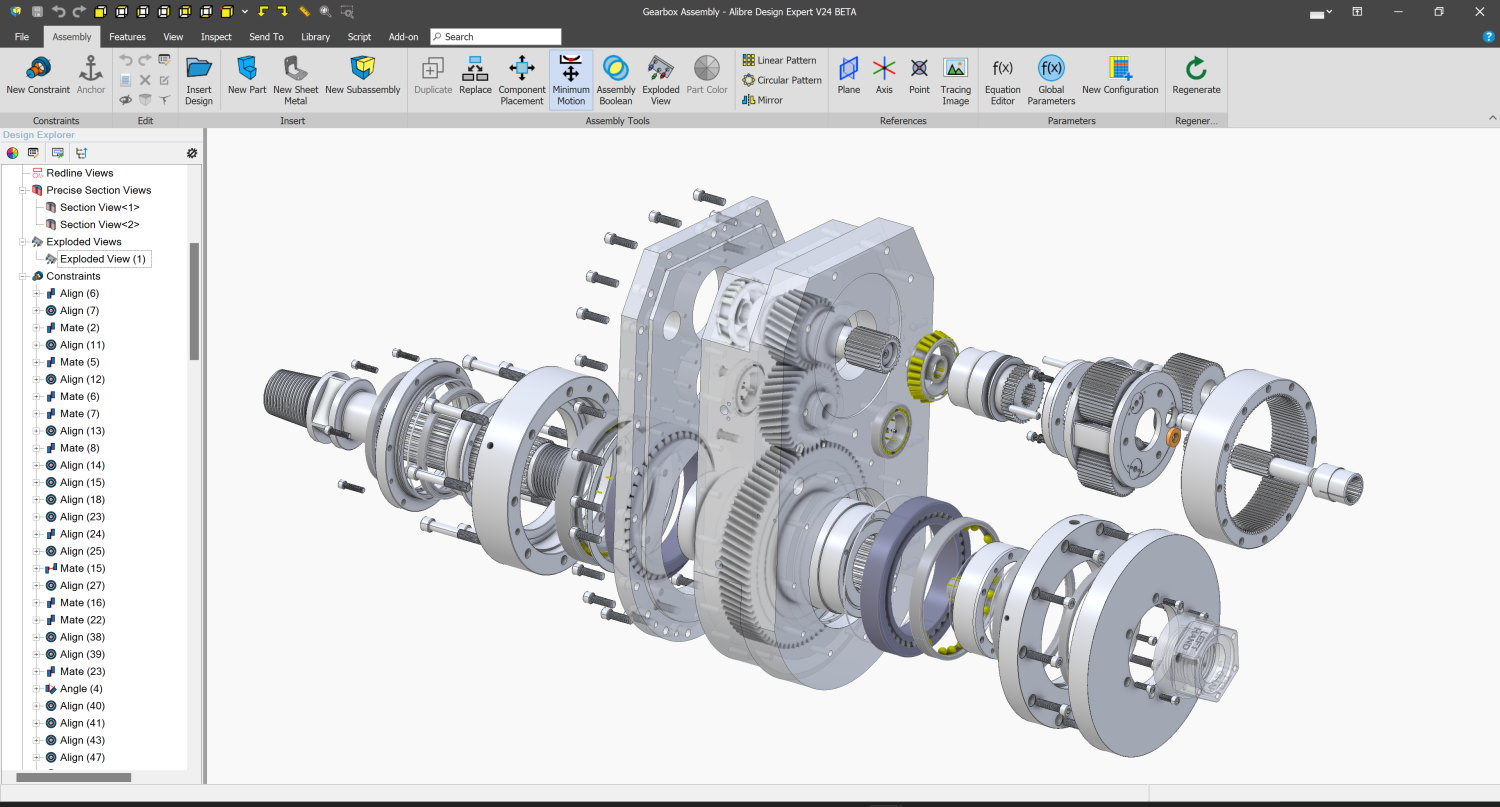
An example of an "exploded" CAD model. Explosions with callouts are popularly used visual communications modified by technical writers from engineering models.

Technical writing is a labor-intensive form of writing that demands accurate research of a subject and the conversion of collected information into a written format, style, and reading level the end-user will easily understand or connect with. There are two main forms of technical writing.

== Procedural ==
By far, the most common form of technical writing is procedural technical writing. Procedures are simply instructions broken down into easily understood, individual steps. To be effective, the expert and "layman" reader must be equally capable of understanding the same procedures. This is why accuracy, standardization, and simplicity are so critical in producing this form of writing.

- Procedural technical writing is used in all types of science and industry throughout the world.
- Technical writing procedures are widely used to explain user operation, assembly, installation instructions, and personnel work/safety steps (e.g., Standard Operating Procedures).

The software industry is now one of the largest users of procedural technical writing and relies on procedural documents to describe a program's user operation and installation instructions.

== Scientific ==
The second most common form of technical writing is often referred to as scientific technical writing. This form of technical writing follows "white paper" writing standards and is used to market a specialized product/service or opinion/discovery to select readers. Organizations normally use scientific technical writing to publish white papers as industry journal articles or academic papers. Scientific technical writing is written to appeal to readers familiar with a technical topic. Unlike procedural technical writing, these documents often include unique industry terms, data, and a clear bias supporting the author or the authoring organization's findings/position. This secondary form of technical writing must show a deep knowledge of a subject and the field of work with the sole purpose of persuading readers to agree with a paper's conclusion. Technical writers generally author, or ghost write white papers for an organization or industry expert, but are rarely credited in the published version.

== Basic elements ==
In most cases, however, technical writing is used to help convey complex scientific or niche subjects to end users with a wide range of comprehension. To ensure the content is understood by all, Plain Language (PL) is used, and only factual content is provided. Modern procedural technical writing relies on simple terms and short sentences rather than detailed explanations with unnecessary information like personal pronouns, abstract words, and unfamiliar acronyms. To achieve the right grammar; procedural documents are written from a third-person, objective perspective with an active voice and formal tone. Technical writing grammar is very similar to print journalism and follows a very similar style of grammar.

Although technical writing plays an integral role in the work of engineering, health care, and science, it does not require a degree in any of these fields. Instead, the document's author must be an expert in technical writing. An organization's subject-matter experts (SMEs), internal specifications, and a formal engineering review process are relied upon to ensure accuracy. Established roles create the necessary division of labor to bring greater focus to the two sides of an organization's documentation. In general, a technical writer is tasked with ensuring the correct style and formatting are applied, while SMEs review for accuracy. Most technical writers hold a liberal arts degree in a writing discipline, such as technical communication, journalism, English, technical journalism, communication, etc. Technical writing is the largest segment of the technical communication field.

Examples of fields requiring technical writing include computer hardware and software, architecture, engineering, chemistry, aeronautics, robotics, manufacturing, finance, medical, patent law, consumer electronics, biotechnology, and forestry.

== Overview ==
Technical writing is most commonly performed by a trained technical writer and the content they produce is the product of a well-defined process. Technical writers follow strict guidelines so the technical writing they share appears in an uniformly standardized and popularly used format and style (e.g., DITA, markdown format, AP Stylebook, Chicago Manual of Style). A technical writer's primary job is to communicate technical information in the most clear and effective way possible. To achieve the highest level of clarity, an organization's technical writing should be indistinguishable to the reader - with no variations in the established format, grammar, and/or style between authors. A technical writer's subject matter is often complex, so strong writing and communication skills are essential. Technical writing is in no way limited to written communication. Visual communication is often incorporated into documentation to help simplify complex topics. Technical writers use various modern image and graphics editing software to produce visual communication. Software to edit illustrations, diagrams, and CAD explosions are common tools of the trade.

In some cases, engineers may perform the technical writing for the project they are working on, but this rarely occurs in large organizations where products must be released or revised weekly. On the business side, marketing materials or press releases are usually written by writers trained in a marketing field and/or creative writing. However, a technical writer may be relied upon to provide editing and other input on any technical content an organization may produce.

== History ==
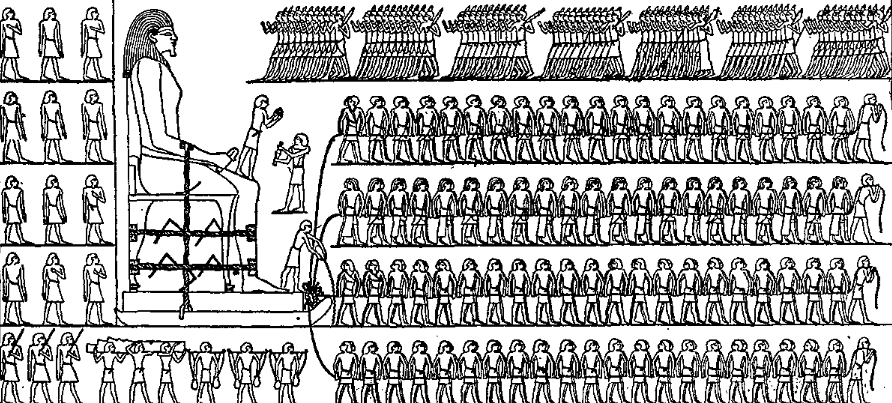
Ancient Egyptian technical writers often relied, exclusively, on visual communication for technical writing. The same method was popularized in modern day by Ikea.

While technical writing has only been recognized as a profession since World War II, its roots can be traced to ancient Egypt, where visual communication was regularly used to explain procedures. In ancient Greek and Roman times, technical writing by the works of writers like Aristotle and Democratus are cited as some of the earliest forms of written technical writing. The earliest examples of what would be considered modern procedural technical writing date back to the early alchemists. These early scientists developed what we now know as "recipes". Some of the earliest discoveries of written procedural steps in Western Civilization date back to 1100 A.D. However, visual communication was used to describe step procedures in ancient India and China much earlier.

With the invention of the mechanical printing press, the onset of the Renaissance, and the rise of the Age of Reason, documenting findings became a necessity. Inventors and scientists like Isaac Newton and Leonardo da Vinci prepared documents that chronicled their inventions and findings. While never called technical documents during their period of publication, these documents played a crucial role in developing modern forms of technical communication and writing.

The field of technical communication grew during the Industrial Revolution. There was a growing need to provide people with instructions for using the increasingly complex machines that were being invented. However, unlike the past, where skills were handed down through oral traditions, no one besides the inventors knew how to use these new devices. Writing thus became the fastest and most effective way to disseminate information, and writers who could document these devices were desired.

During the 20th century, the need for technical writing skyrocketed, and the profession became officially recognized. The events of World War I and World War II led to advances in medicine, military hardware, computer technology, and aerospace technologies. This rapid growth, coupled with the urgency of war, created an immediate need for well-designed documentation to support the use of these technologies. Technical writing was in high demand during this time, and "technical writer" became an official job title during World War II.

Following World War II, technological advances led to an increase in consumer goods and standards of living. During the post-war boom, public services like libraries and universities, as well as transport systems like buses and highways, saw substantial growth. The need for writers to chronicle these processes increased. It was also during this period that large business and universities started using computers. Notably, in 1949, Joseph D. Chapline authored the first computational technical document, an instruction manual for the BINAC computer.

The invention of the transistor in 1947 allowed computers to be produced more cheaply and within the purchasing range of individuals and small businesses. As the market for these "personal computers" grew, so did the need for writers who could explain and provide user documentation for these devices. The profession of technical writing saw further expansion during the 1970s and 1980s as consumer electronics found their way into the homes of more and more people.

In recent years, the prominence of computers in society has led to many advances in the field of digital communications, leading to changes in the tools technical writers use. Hypertext, word processors, graphics editing programs, and page layout software have made the creation of technical documents faster and easier, and technical writers of today must be proficient in these programs.

== Technical documents ==
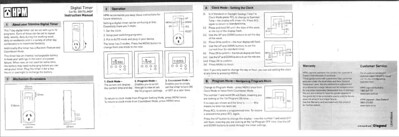
Slimeline digital timer instruction manual from 2016.

Technical writing covers many genres and writing styles, depending on the information and audience. Some examples of commonly used technical documentation include:

- API documentation: Used mainly in the web development field to document individual web application operating instructions and revisions using an application programming interface (API). Common API tools, such as Swagger and Postman, allow technical writers to easily produce documentation in markdown for upload to specific API directories containing related code (e.g., localization, login, security). API documentation is generally automatically converted into a standardized "markdown" format from within an API tool's WYSIWYG editor. In most cases, technical writers upload directory software instruction updates whenever new code updates are applied. Website directories are normally stored and updated in "Git", allowing programmers to easily move updated directories onto a testing server and then the live server.
- Assembly Instructions (AI): Provides internal procedures for assembly-line personnel. Individual steps are written and assigned to members of an assembly team. Often the technical writer will include CAD explosions to simplify complex assemblies.
- Case study: A published report about a person, group, or situation that has been studied over time; also a situation in real life that can be looked at or studied to learn about something. In large organizations, technical writers only provide copyediting or ghostwriting services for case studies. Management-level authorship is generally required to meet national standards and codes.
- Component Maintenance Manuals (CMMs): Mainly used in aerospace to notify customers whenever a significant part of a component must be repaired or replaced. All component-related Service Bulletins must be incorporated and/or referenced in a CMM, along with the latest component drawings and information. CMMs follow Aerospace Transport Association (ATA) formatting and ATA Spec 100/iSpec 2200 chaptering.
- Installation manuals (IM): Procedures designed to help the end-user install a product or software program in the field.
- Inspection Report: Mainly used in large building construction and civil engineering, this report details the construction issues/defects identified by a field inspector at various project stages. The identified issues/defects are captured, initially, in a punch list. A technical writer references the punch list to write an inspection report. Detailed issue/defect images, locations, and descriptions are provided in inspection reports so builders can more easily understand how best to fix issues or make repairs correctly. In some cases, suggested remedies may also be included.
- Knowledgebase or Help center: Online help sites, designed to provide users with pages of technical information about products and/or services. The content for these sites may be created and uploaded to the web in SGML, XML, or XHTML. Technical writing Content management systems are used to manage and upload these websites.
- Packing list or Shipping list: Identifies the shipped parts, product safety data and manufacturer's contact information.
- Service Bulletins (SBs): Mainly used in aerospace to notify customers whenever a repair and/or modification may be required for a minor part of a component. Manufacturers author and then issue SBs to aircraft owners. SBs follow Aerospace Transport Association (ATA) formatting and ATA Spec 100/iSpec 2200 chaptering.
- Specifications or Specs: Used in the construction industry to outline installation minimum standards and requirements. Specifications are normally provided to the builder by a project manager and must be signed and accepted by the builder as part of the contract. Formatting standards are set by the Construction Specifications Institute (CSI).
- Specification sheet/Spec Sheets or Datasheets: One or two-page reference sheets, designed to provide common product/service characteristics required for specific applications. Common product/service maximum and minimum characteristics may include: size and footprint, weight, connection type or interfaces, electrical requirements, speed, etc.
- Standard Operating Procedures (SOPs): Procedural steps military, manufacturing, medical, and industrial safety personnel reference to accomplish assembly, processing, or any other work task that must be physically completed in proper order.
- Survey report: A comprehensive document of a land surveyance produced from photographs and technical data collected and outlined by surveyors.
- Technical marketing content: Information written exclusively for marketing purposes. This content is often used to help describe product information and specifications in marketing materials and on product/service web pages. Traditionally, creative writers specializing in marketing are hired for this work.
- User Manuals (UM) or Operation manuals: Procedural instructions for a product or program's operation. Technical documentation may also be evaluated through usability testing, in which representative users perform tasks using the documentation and their performance or difficulties are observed to identify areas for improvement.
- White papers: Marketing documents, often ghostwritten by technical writers and credited to experts in a field. All white papers have a persuasive subject and present an argument supporting the expert's conclusion.

== Tools ==
The following tools are used by technical writers to author and present documents:

- CAD rendering: Technical writers working in mechanical engineering often use CAD rendering tools to "explode" engineering-created and -approved 3D CAD designs. The goal is to visually communicate assembly/disassembly procedural steps more clearly. Specialized technical communication CAD software is normally used to modify existing CAD models.
- Collaborative software programs: Technical writing requires collaboration between multiple parties from different departments within an organization. To increase communication between parties, technical writers rely on Wiki Systems such as Confluence and shared document workspacess.
- Content Management Systems (CMSs): Modern technical writing is often edited and published in a specialized markup language CMS or CCMS designed for technical writing. The CMS is used to easily and rapidly publish large volumes of technical writing content online and/or as PDF files. The uploaded content is automatically converted into a "knowledgebase" help system for end-users to reference. In addition to basic WYSIWYG editing features and web uploading, a CMS also provides content management features with version management and built-in tools to manage large documentation workflows. Most CMSs used for technical writing are SGML, XML, or XHTML based.
- Desktop publishing tools or word processors: In the 1990s, most technical writing was performed with word processing tools. These early programs allowed technical writers to author, edit, design, and print documents from a computer. White paper authors generally still rely on word processing and enhanced desktop publishing tools to edit their documents.
- Graphics software: Images and other visual elements are used in technical writing to help communicate information in simpler terms than printed text can accomplish. In these instances, popularly used graphic software is used in technical writing to create and edit the visual elements of documents (e.g., photos, icons, diagrams, etc.)
- Graphing software: To communicate statistical information, technical writing often includes graphs and flowcharts. Popular database software is commonly used to create basic graphs and charts. Occasionally, technical writing must provide more sophisticated graphs with interactive online features. SQL database graphing software is often used to perform this work.
- Screen capture tools: Technical writing for software procedures frequently includes screen captures. There are two types of screen capture - still frame and video. Still-frame screen captures are popularly used in the software industry. Technical writers often include a still-frame screen capture to help explain more complex procedures. Sometimes, a technical writer may simply record a short video of their desktops to show a software procedure. However, this is less common due to the many revisions software experiences.
- Specification software: Cloud-based specifying software is often used by a "specifier/technical writer" to select a list of common minimum standards required for a construction project. These programs are normally formatted to comply with the Construction Specifications Institute (CSI) standards.

== List of associations ==
- American Medical Writers Association
- Construction Specifications Institute (CSI)
- Czech Society for Technical Communication
- European Association for Technical Communication
- IEEE Professional Communication Society
- Institute of Scientific and Technical Communicators
- Organization for the Advancement of Structured Information Standards (OASIS) - DITA
- SIGDOC
- Society for Technical Communication (Defunct as of 2025)
