= Ernesto Morgado =

Portuguese computer scientist

Ernesto M. Morgado is a Portuguese computer scientist and software entrepreneur. He has served as Associate Professor of computer science and engineering in Instituto Superior Técnico (Technical University of Lisbon) since 1992. He was one of the people behind the creation of the Computer Science and Engineering degree of Instituto Superior Técnico (Technical University of Lisbon), in 1988, and one of the founders of the Department of Computer Science and Engineering there in 1998.

== Early life ==
Morgado earned a licentiate degree in mechanical engineering (1976) from Instituto Superior Técnico (Technical University of Lisbon) and a Master of Science in computer science (1981) and a Ph.D. in artificial intelligence (1986) from State University of New York at Buffalo.

== Career ==
He was lecturer of computer Science in Millard Fillmore College (State University of New York at Buffalo) in 1980 and Canisius College (1981–1984).

In 1986, together with João Pavão Martins, he founded SISCOG - Sistemas Cognitivos, SA, a startup devoted to Artificial Intelligence. Together they led the company to develop and deploy software systems in railway and metro companies throughout Europe. These systems plan and manage more than 20,000 people, affect the life of millions of passengers, and have been recognized by organisations in Europe and the United States.

Morgado is also involved in the food industry.

He is president of Ernesto Morgado S.A., a rice huller company founded by his grandfather in 1920. Since 2003, he transformed the company's focus from staple foods to value-added products, namely high-quality ready meals based on rice.

He became president of FERM (Federation of European Rice Millers) at its inception in 2002, president of ANIA (Portuguese Rice Millers Association) in 1990, and vice-president of COTArroz (Portuguese Rice Chain Association) in 2004. At FIPA (Portuguese Food Industry Federation), he is currently, and for the second time, president of the board (1997–2003 and 2009) and served as vice-president of its executive committee (1990–1997) and president of the Control Council (2003–2009).

He was a member of CIP (Portuguese Industry Confederation) Council of Presidents (1990–2007).

=== Author ===
Morgado is author/co-author of:

- Morgado, Ernesto Jose Marques (1986). Semantic networks as abstract data types (phd thesis). USA: State University of New York at Buffalo.
- Morgado, E.M. (1992). "Meta-Knowledge, -Rules and -Reasoning, Encyclopedia of Artificial Intelligence". In Shapiro), Stuart Charles (ed.). Encyclopedia of artificial intelligence. Wiley. pp. 598–603. ISBN 0-471-50307-X. OCLC 1057741307.
- Martins, J. P.; Morgado, E. M., eds. (1989). Epia 89. Lecture Notes in Computer Science. Vol. 390. doi:10.1007/3-540-51665-4. ISBN 978-3-540-51665-1. ISSN 0302-9743. S2CID 22783078.
- Morgado, E.M.; Martins, J.P. (1993). "An AI-based approach to crew scheduling". Proceedings of 9th IEEE Conference on Artificial Intelligence for Applications. IEEE Comput. Soc. Press. pp. 71–77. doi:10.1109/caia.1993.366659. ISBN 0-8186-3840-0. S2CID 53419159.
