= IEEE Transactions on Professional Communication =

- Discipline: Technical communication
- Language: English
- Edited by: Saul Carliner

Publication details
- Former names: Transactions of the I.R.E. Engineering Writing and Speech, IEEE Engineering Writing and Speech
- History: 1957–present
- Publisher: IEEE Professional Communication Society
- Frequency: Quarterly
- Impact factor: 2.184 (2016)

Standard abbreviations
- ISO 4: IEEE Trans. Prof. Commun.

Indexing
- ISSN: 0361-1434

Links
- Journal homepage; Online access

IEEE Transactions on Professional Communication is a peer-reviewed journal publishing four times a year since 1957 by the IEEE Professional Communication Society. Readers include engineers, scientists, technical and professional writers, information designers, managers, and others working as scholars, educators, and practitioners in the effective communication of technical and business information.

== See also ==
- IEEE Communications Letters
- IEEE Communications Surveys and Tutorials
- IEEE Transactions on Communications
- IEEE Journal on Selected Areas in Communications
- IEEE Transactions on Education
- IEEE Transactions on Information Theory
