= Siscog =

Portuguese software company

SISCOG - Sistemas Cognitivos, SA
- Type: Private
- Industry: software
- Founded: 1986, Lisbon, Portugal
- Key people: João Pavão Martins, Ernesto Morgado (Founders and CEO)
- Products: Resource scheduling and management solutions – ONTIME, FLEET, CREWS
- Number of employees: 140 (2016)
- Website: www.siscog.pt

SISCOG is a software company that provides decision support systems for resource planning and management in transportation companies, with special experience in the field of railways.

== History ==
The initial ideas for founding SISCOG started to be discussed in 1982, while João Pavão Martins and Ernesto Morgado were Ph.D. students in artificial intelligence at the State University of New York at Buffalo. These ideas were influenced by the success of the first commercial expert systems and led to the company's incorporation in 1986.

In the last 30 years, SISCOG has developed several software products that offer users different levels of decision support. These range from validating all the constraints pertaining to a problem and performing helpful calculations while the users build the plan (manual mode), to pointing out directions for achieving a solution (semi-automatic mode), or even achieving an optimized solution by themselves (automatic mode). These products use a combination of artificial intelligence and operational research optimization technologies to produce solutions that attempt to fit the client's needs.

SISCOG has implemented its decision support systems in companies like the Canadian Railways, Dutch Railways, Finnish Railways, Norwegian State Railways, Danish State Railways, DSB S-Tog (Copenhagen Suburban Trains), London Underground, and Lisbon Metro.

SISCOG's products have been awarded in 1997, 2003 and 2012 with the "Innovative Application Award" given by the Association for the Advancement of Artificial Intelligence (AAAI) and was laureated with the Computerworld Honor in 2006. In 2015, the Conference on Advanced Systems in Public Transport (CASPT) recognized a SISCOG and Netherlands Railways' joint paper entitled "Security crew scheduling at Netherlands Railways" with the "Best Practice Paper Award".

On July 1, 2025, SISCOG was acquired by Modaxo, a subsidiary of Constellation Software, the Canadian group recognized as the largest global investor in vertical market software. The transaction marks a significant milestone in SISCOG’s growth and international expansion strategy. The sell-side advisory was led by the Portuguese team of João Santos and Bernardo Quintino from Corporate Finance International (CFI), a global M&A advisory firm.

== Software Products ==
SISCOG offers a family of integrated products, each composed of several integrated modules. These modules address the whole resource scheduling and management cycle in transportation companies and are fully customizable to the reality and needs of each individual company.

ONTIME is a product that creates detailed timetables, all the way from the annual timetables down to day-to-day adjustments due to special holidays, large-scale events, and track engineering work. ONTIME schedules and manages the allocation of two important resources to the company trips: space (routes, railway lines and tracks, air routes and corridors, etc.) and time (departure and arrival times of all trip legs).

FLEET, a product for vehicle scheduling and management It creates optimized vehicle schedules, considering expected passenger figures, fleet specifications, and operational constraints. FLEET produces long-term cyclic plans, calendars short-term plans, handles vehicle scheduled maintenance, and provides decision-support during day-to-day operation.

CREWS is a product for scheduling and managing the work of staff. CREWS optimizes the use of both on-board personnel (drivers, guards, conductors, catering staff, etc.) as well as local staff (station, contact center, railway yard staff, etc.). CREWS produces long-term cyclic schedules (duties and rosters) as well as short-term calendar schedules, taking into account special days of operation and staff's individual schedules and preferences. It maintains several kinds of individual work time accounts, provides individual inspection of work, and provides standard interfaces to payroll and HR management systems.
