= NATO Committee on the Challenges of Modern Society =

Organization

NATO emblem

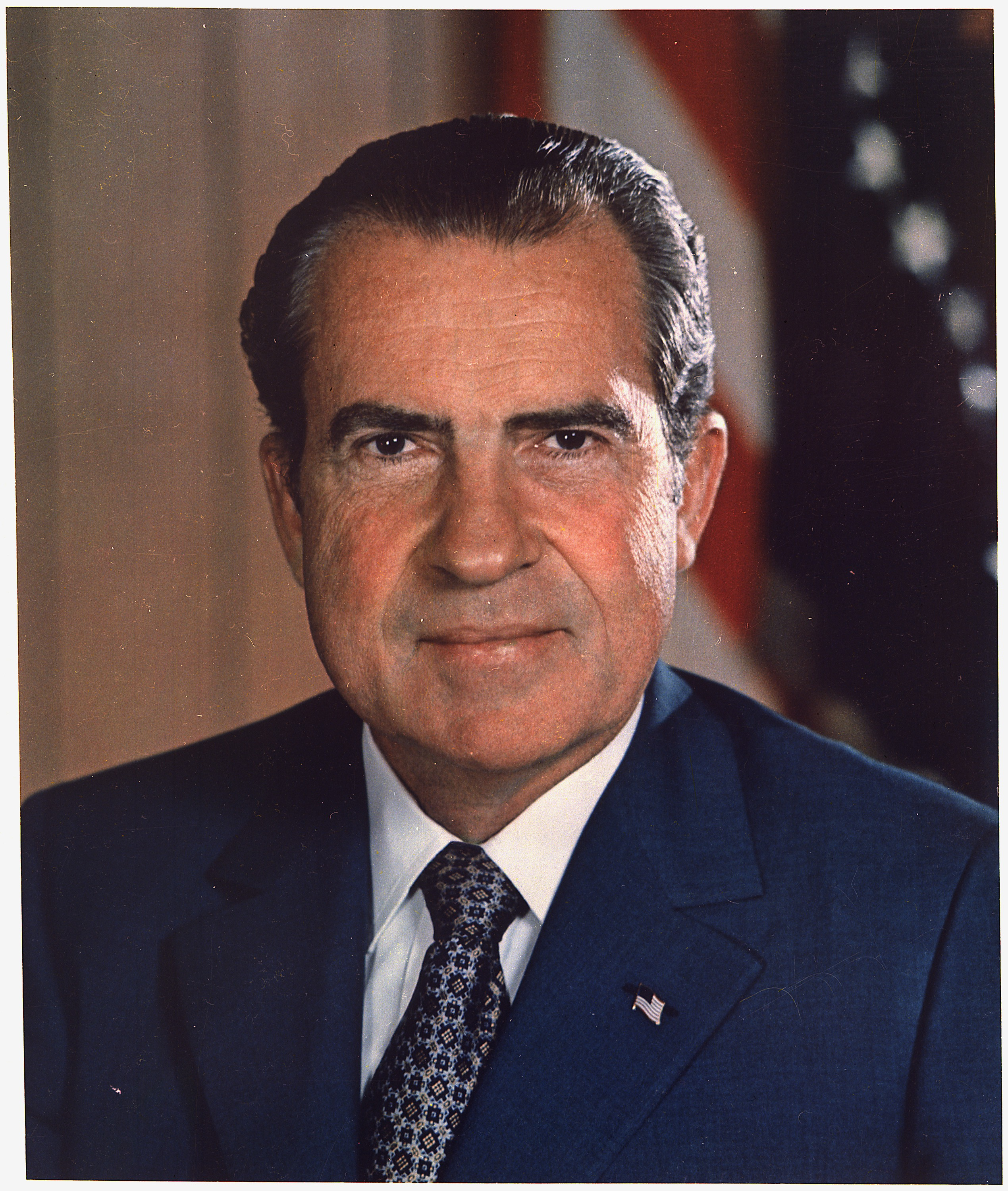
Richard Nixon

The Committee on the Challenges of Modern Society (NATO/CCMS) was a scientific research committee created in 1969 by the North Atlantic Council to study environmental problems of various nations, and the quality of life of their people.

US President Richard Nixon had suggested on NATO's twentieth anniversary to install the new body to work on the environment.

== Background of the CCMS ==
President Nixon suggested a few new initiatives for NATO. Aside from the military initiatives, Nixon decided to create a medium-range policy group that revolved around environmental problems common in developed nations. The work of the CCMS combined the knowledge of an entire international community to come to well researched conclusions.

== Goals of CCMS ==
The CCMS was founded on November 24, 1969, complying with the NATO goal of Article 2 which states "the Parties will promote conditions of stability and well-being". The CCMS exchanged information on environmental, technical and scientific experience within both military and civilian communities. The CCMS convened twice a year and would discuss policy as well as report on continuing projects and discuss new projects. The project has four main components: short-term project, pilot study, workshop seminar and research fellowship. The CCMS was created with the design to expound upon and add to conclusions made by the OECD, EEC, ECE, UNEP.

NATO member nations 1969	Year nation became member
Belgium	1949 (founder)
Canada	1949 (founder)
Denmark	1949 (founder)
France	1949 (founder)
Germany	1955
Greece	1952
Iceland	1949 (founder)
Italy	1949 (founder)
Luxembourg	1949 (founder)
Netherlands	1949 (founder)
Norway	1949 (founder)
Portugal	1949 (founder)
Turkey	1952
United Kingdom	1949 (founder)
United States	1949 (founder)

== Pilot studies ==
The CCMS did not force specific countries into conducting pilot studies, instead encouraging self-motivation to begin their own study. This ensured that countries were ready and highly motivated when they provided their expert opinion. This pilot group could then take on co-pilots, with other countries that shared the same expertise or enthusiasm and could contribute to the research. This compelled many countries to contribute to the overall progress of ideas and conclusions made by the CCMS. Other non-NATO nations were asked to be involved as well and share their opinion; this practice combined: willing participants, skeptical observers and determined detractors. The quality of work continued to grow as 2000 experts from 15 member countries and 20 non-member contributors were compiling with the CCMS. Consensus among nations stated that the CCMS offered more technological and professional points of view than any other organization

=== Pilot study summary - drinking water project pilot series CCMS - 130 ===
In April 1983 the EPA initiated the pilot summary to address the issue of drinking water quality and other health related issues. Six separate areas were examined during the study by groups from the eleven countries of NATO. The study also included three non NATO nations and technical assistance from many others. The categories include: Analytical chemistry and data handling, advanced treatment technology, microbiology, health effects, reuse of water resources and ground water protection.

=== Pilot study summary - road safety ===
Headed by the United States, this was a pilot study that focused on a multi-faceted project on road safety. France was a major contributor as a co-pilot focusing on road hazards, identification and correction. Canada served as a co-pilot researching alcohol and highway safety and Italy contributed data on emergency services.

== International attitudes and results of CCMS studies ==
=== United Kingdom ===
- Initiative for "Bus Priority Systems" distributed throughout Belgium and 2000 communities in the United States.

=== Belgium ===
- Viewed NATO as more than a military alliance. Welcomed the initiatives of the CCMS and believed that the NATO alliance was meant to allow for political and economic consultation. A Belgian foreign minister had previously proposed a motion that NATO would include an outreach program prior to the institution of the CCMS. Belgian experts believed that NATO required organizations with a peaceful message and agreed that the CCMS worked well as a cohesive unit.

=== Norway ===
- Prime Minister Per Borten vetoed Norwegian participation of the CCMS in 1969. Years later under a new Minister of the Environment, Norway decided to participate fully and had an active role in seven different pilot studies.

=== Sweden ===
- As a global leader in technology, the Swedes made major contributions to the CCMS. As the manufacturers of Volvo, they participated in the American-led pilot study on road safety. Sweden was also the home for a government-subsidized private environmental research institute that is located north of Stockholm and researched heavily on CCMS topics.

== United States attitudes and results of CCMS studies ==
- American study of air pollution reduction implemented in several nations, even countries not involved with pilot study.
- A study conducted by Alan Berlind of National War College, polled 120 uniformed senior officers being groomed for star or flag rank. Of those 120, 108 responded including many that had previously worked on NATO affairs. 63% answered that NATO would be an inappropriate forum for environmental cooperation; 72% were of the opinion that NATO would not be an effective forum.

== Current state of the CCMS ==
During the 1990s conflicts of interest occurred between the Science Committee (SCOM) and the CCMS. With decreased participation from member and partner nations the committees combined to form the Science for Peace and Security Committee on June 28, 2006.
