= Robert E. Horn =

American political scientist (born 1933)

Robert E. Horn (born 1933) is an American political scientist who taught at Harvard, Columbia, and Sheffield (U.K.) universities, and has been a visiting scholar at Stanford University's Center for the Study of Language and Information. He is known for the development of information mapping.

== Overview ==
Bob Horn is perhaps best known for his development of information mapping, a method of information development called structured writing suited especially for technical communication.

His latest contributions to the presentation of information have been in the field of visual language. Horn has extended the use of visual language and visual analytics to develop methods—involving large, detailed infographics and argument map murals—for exploring and resolving wicked problems.

== Selected publications ==
- Horn, Robert E.; Nicol, Elizabeth H.; Keinman, Joel C.; Grace, Michael G. (1969). Information mapping for learning and reference (PDF). Cambridge, MA; Springfield, VA: Information Resources Inc.; Reproduced by NTIS, United States Department of Commerce. OCLC 7580459. Archived from the original (PDF) on 4 March 2016.
- Horn, Robert E.; Cleaves, Anne; Zuckerman, David W. (1980) [1970]. The guide to simulations/games for education and training (4th ed.). Beverly Hills, CA: SAGE Publications. ISBN 0803913753. OCLC 5310081.
- Horn, Robert E. (1972). The guide to federal assistance for education. New York: Appleton-Century-Crofts. OCLC 308905.
- Horn, Robert E. (1989). Mapping hypertext: the analysis, organization, and display of knowledge for the next generation of on-line text and graphics. Lexington, MA: Lexington Institute. ISBN 0962556505. OCLC 21439661.
- Horn, Robert E. (1998). Visual language: global communication for the 21st century. Bainbridge Island, WA: MacroVU, Inc. ISBN 189263709X. OCLC 41138655.
- Horn, Robert E. (1999). "Information design: the emergence of a new profession" (PDF). In Jacobson, Robert E. (ed.). Information design. Cambridge, MA: MIT Press. pp. 15–34. ISBN 026210069X. OCLC 40693279.
- Horn, Robert E. (2003). "Infrastructure for navigating interdisciplinary debates: critical decisions for representing argumentation". In Kirschner, Paul Arthur; Buckingham Shum, Simon J.; Carr, Chad S. (eds.). Visualizing argumentation: software tools for collaborative and educational sense-making. Computer supported cooperative work. London; New York: Springer-Verlag. pp. 165–184. doi:10.1007/978-1-4471-0037-9_8. ISBN 1852336641. OCLC 50676911.
- Horn, Robert E. (April 2006). "What we do not know: using information murals to portray scientific ignorance". Futures. 38 (3): 372–377. doi:10.1016/j.futures.2005.07.009.
