= John M. Carroll (information scientist) =

Jack Carroll
- Born: John Millar Carroll; 1950 (age 74–75)
- Awards: CHI Academy (2002)
- Scientific career
- Fields: Human-computer interaction; Computer-supported cooperative work; Community informatics; Design research; Learning sciences
- Institutions: IBM; MIT; Virginia Tech; Pennsylvania State University
- Website: jcarroll.ist.psu.edu

John Millar Carroll (born 1950) is an American distinguished professor of Information Sciences and Technology at Pennsylvania State University, where he previously served as the Edward Frymoyer Chair of Information Sciences and Technology. Carroll is perhaps best known for his theory of Minimalism in computer instruction, training, and technical communication.

== Career and research ==
Carroll was a founder of the study of human–computer interaction, one of the nine core areas of Computer Science identified by the Association for Computing Machinery (ACM). He served on the program committee of the 1982 Bureau of Standards Conference on the Human Factors of Computing Systems that in effect inaugurated the field, and was the direct predecessor of the field's flagship conference series, the ACM CHI Conferences.

Since the 1980s, Carroll has been involved in the development of the field of human–computer Interaction. In 1984 he founded the User Interface Institute at the IBM Thomas J. Watson Research Center. In 1994, he joined Virginia Tech as Department Head of Computer Science to establish an HCI focus in research and teaching at the university's Center for Human-Computer Interaction.

He was a founding associate editor of the field's premier journal, ACM Transactions on Computer-Human Interaction, and a founding member of editorial boards of Transactions on Information Systems, Behavior and Information Technology, and the International Journal of Human-Computer Interaction.

== Awards and honors ==
Carroll was elected to the CHI Academy in 2002 and received the ACM SIGCHI Lifetime Achievement Award in 2003 for his contribution to the field of human–computer interaction (HCI or CHI). He was named an Honorary Fellow of the Society for Technical Communication in 2015 for his groundbreaking work on Minimalism. He was elected a Fellow of the International Core Academy of Sciences and Humanities in 2024.

== Books published ==
- Bever, Thomas G.; Carroll, John M.; Miller, Lance A., eds. (1986). Talking Minds: The Study of Language in the Cognitive Sciences. MIT. ISBN 9780262521147.
- Carroll, John M. (1987). Carroll, John M. (ed.). Interfacing Thought: Cognitive Aspects of Human-Computer Interaction. MIT. ISBN 0262031256. (Republished 2003, ISBN 9780262532211.)
- Carroll, John M. (1990). The Nurnberg Funnel - Designing Minimalist Instruction for Practical Computer Skill. MIT. ISBN 9780262031639.
- Carroll, John M. (1995). Scenario-Based Design: Envisioning Work and Technology in System Development. Wiley. ISBN 978-3527318254.
- Carroll, John M., ed. (1996). Computer Security (3rd ed.). Butterworth-Heinemann. ISBN 9780750696005.
- Moran, Thomas P.; Carroll, John M., eds. (1996). Design Rationale: Concepts, Techniques, and Use. CRC Press. ISBN 0805815678.
- Carroll, John M., ed. (1998). Minimalism Beyond the Nurnberg Funnel. MIT. ISBN 9780262512954.
- Carroll, John M. (2000). Making Use: Scenario-Based Design of Human-Computer Interactions. MIT. ISBN 9780262513883.
- Carroll, John M. (2001). Human-Computer Interaction in the New Millennium. Addison-Wesley Professional. ISBN 978-0201704471.
- Rosson, Mary Beth; Carroll, John M., eds. (2001). Usability Engineering: Scenario-Based Development of Human-Computer Interaction. Morgan Kaufmann. ISBN 978-1558607125.
- Carroll, John M. (2003). HCI Models, Theories, and Frameworks: Toward a Multidisciplinary Science. Morgan Kaufmann. ISBN 978-1558608085.
- Burge, Janet E.; Carroll, John M.; McCall, Raymond; Mistrik, Ivan, eds. (2008). Rationale-Based Software Engineering. Springer. ISBN 978-3540775829.
- Carroll, John M., ed. (2012). Creativity and Rationale: Enhancing Human Experience by Design. Springer. ISBN 978-1447141105.
