= Experience architecture =

Experience architecture (XA) is the art of articulating a clear user story/journey through an information architecture, interaction design and experience design that an end user navigates across products and services offered by the client or as intended by the designer This visual representation is intended not only to highlight the systems that the end user will touch and interact with, but also the key interactions that the user will have with interacting the internal systems or back end structure of an application. It provides a holistic view of the experience, vertical knowledge of industry, the systems, documentation, and analysis of the points that should be focused on when delivering a holistic experience. The Experience architecture provides an overall direction for user experience actions across the projects.

== Experience architect ==
An experience architect (also known as an XA) is a designer authoring, planning, and designing the experience architecture deliverables. An XA will encompass a variety of interaction and digital design skills of human behaviour, user-centered design (UCD) and interaction design. This person is also responsible for connecting human emotions with the end product thus creating co-relations by ensuring that the experience meets or exceeds needs and objectives of the intended or wide users. The XA integrates the results into an actionable requirements. They are responsible for conceptualising and delivering the design deliverables that meets business and usability objectives by identifying the modules, templates, and structure necessary for end-product integrations.

== Experience architect deliverables ==
Experience architects are responsible for documenting and delivering a series of project manuals, guidelines and specifications. These include all or some of the below practices.

- Persona
- Scenario
- User story
- User journey
- Process flow diagram
- Information Architecture
- Wireframe
  - Ranging from High-Fidelity to Low-Fidelity
- Content strategy
- Prototype
- Functional specification

== Inclusive experience ==
A great design experience must be self-explanatory and emphasize a user journey from step to step in minimalistic manner. In a broader term, it is a branch of inclusive design and universal design. The purpose of inclusion in the context of experience architecture is to create technology and user interfaces accessible for wider audiences inclusive of full range of human diversity with respect to ability, gender, age and other forms of human difference.

This methodology is to achieve independent experience and accessibility for users who are aging, abled or disabled or impaired either by birth, natural or incurred through natural events. It requires exercising and creating interfaces or prototyping a lower level design for physical world that makes actions and steps more self-explanatory thereby removing layers of prerequisite requirements to access any digital system. Inclusive Experience is an emerging and developing skill sets and standard elements in applications that are mass-produced for consumers, government and in other public domains.

== Education ==
The first Experience Architecture program began at Michigan State University. Developed by Liza Potts, Rebecca Tegtmeyer, Bill Hart-Davidson, this program launched in 2014.

=== Bachelor programs ===
- BA Experience Architecture – Michigan State University

== Related areas ==
- Application architecture
- Business analyst
- Card sorting
- Content strategy
- Contextual inquiry
- Data architecture
- Data management
- Design thinking
- Experiential interior design
- Human factors
- Information architecture
- Information design
- Information system
- Interaction design
- Participatory design
- Semantic Web
- Service design
- Taxonomy
- Usability testing
- User-centered design
- User experience design
