= Society for Technical Communication =

Professional association

The Society for Technical Communication (STC) was a professional association dedicated to the advancement of the theory and practice of technical communication with more than 4,500 members in the United States, Canada, and the world. The society published a quarterly journal and a magazine eight times a year and hosted an annual international conference (STC Technical Communication Summit). STC also provided online education in the form of live Web seminars, multi-week online certificate courses, virtual conferences, recorded seminars, and more. At its peak in the early 2000s, it had approximately 25,000 members.

The Society ceased operations on January 29, 2025.

== Overview ==
Headquartered in Fairfax, Virginia, US, STC was the largest organization of its type in the world according to its website. It included 50 chapters, 12 Special Interest Groups (SIGs), and over 4,500 members worldwide. STC members worked in a wide range of roles, including:

- Technical writing
- Editing
- Consulting
- Content development
- Education
- Environmental safety and health communication
- Graphic arts
- Human factors
- Indexing
- Information architecture
- Instructional design
- Management
- Photography
- Single source publishing
- Software development
- Technical illustration
- Translation
- Usability
- Visual design
- Web design

Most STC members belonged to one or more communities, which were either geographic chapters or special interest groups (SIGs). Most chapters were in the United States, but STC included members from 14 countries. The largest group outside the U.S. was the chapter in Toronto, Ontario, Canada.

STC published a quarterly journal, Technical Communication, and a monthly magazine, Intercom.

== Certifications ==
STC offered certification as a Certified Professional Technical Communicator with three tiers: Foundation Level Certification (Level I), Practitioner Level Certification (Level II) Expert Level Certification (Level III). The certification was offered through APMG International and required bi-annual renewal with 12 CEUs.

== History ==
The organization traced its roots to the Society of Technical Writers (STW) in Boston and the Association of Technical Writers and Editors (ATWE) in New York. Both were founded in the United States in 1953. These organizations merged in 1957 to form the Society of Technical Writers and Editors (STWE). In 1960, this group merged with the Technical Publishing Society (TPS), based in Los Angeles, to become the Society of Technical Writers and Publishers. In 1971, the organization's name was changed to the Society for Technical Communication.

The organization's main journal developed from the TWE Journal to the STWE Review to the STWP Review to Technical Communications to Technical Communication. Editors of this journal have included Douglas E. Knight, Allan H. Lytel, A. Stanley Higgins, Frank R. Smith, George Hayhoe, and Menno de Jong.

Other important leaders in the history of STC include Robert T. Hamlett (first president of ATWE), A. E. Tyler (first president of TPS), Samuel A. Miles (president of the Society of Technical Writers and Editors, which became ATWE's New York chapter in 1955), Vernon R. Root, Robert O. Shockney, and Stello Jordan. In 2011, Alan Houser was elected vice president of the organization; per their by-laws, he became president in 2012, and was succeeded by his own vice president Nicky Bleiel in 2013.

STC's annual publications competition for 2012–2013 was held in Washington, D.C. The organization also had branches internationally. On November 12, 2012, STC's branch in India held its 14th annual conference in Bangalore.

== Technical Communication Summit (Annual Conference) ==
In May or June of each year, STC held the Technical Communication Summit, the largest conference for technical communicators in the world. The Summit included over 80 education session broken up into relevant subject areas or tracks; networking events such as the Opening General Session, Welcome Reception, Communities Reception, and Closing Lunch; an Honors Banquet; and an exhibit hall with dozens of companies offering technical communication products or services. The Summit also included preconference education for an additional price.

The final summit was held in Bloomington, Minnesota, from May 14 to 17, 2024, at the Radisson Blu hotel.

== Other education ==
In addition to the Technical Communication Summit, STC offered online education both to its members and non-members, with members receiving discounted registration rates. STC offered both live and recorded online education.

== STC Honors ==
STC recognized outstanding individuals by conferring the titles of Fellow, Associate Fellow, and Honorary Fellow. STC's Honorary Fellow for 2009 was "Jimmy Wales, the co-founder of Wikipedia."

STC also sponsored honorary societies for technical communication students with a grade point average of 3.5 or above:

- Sigma Tau Chi recognizes students in four-year or graduate programs
- Alpha Sigma recognizes students in two-year or certificate programs

== See also ==
- American Medical Writers Association
- Council of Science Editors
- IEEE Professional Communication Society
- SIGDOC, the Special Interest Group on Design of Communication of the Association for Computing Machinery (ACM)
- Technical communication
