= Institute of Scientific and Technical Communicators =

The Institute of Scientific and Technical Communicators (ISTC) is the UK's largest professional association for those involved in technical communication and information design. It encourages professional education and standards, provides guidance about the value of using professional communicators, and provides research resources and networking opportunities for its members and affiliates.

== History ==
The ISTC as it is today was created in 1972 from an amalgamation of three associations: the Presentation of Technical Information Group (founded in 1948), the Technical Publications Association and the Institute of Technical Publicity & Publications. The institute was incorporated as a limited company on 19 July 1972.

Presidents of the ISTC

- 2021-2025: Linda Robins
- 2017-2020: Carol Leahy
- 2014-2017: Alison Peck
- 2010-2014: Paul Ballard
- 2007–2010: Simon Butler
- 2002-2007: Gavin Ireland
- 2000-2002: Iain Wright
- 1998-2000: Anke Harris
- 1996-1998: Gerry Gentle
- 1995-1996: Dave Griffiths
- 1993-1995: Peter Greenfield
- 1991-1993: Ray Green
- 1988-1991: Dennis Reeder
- 1985-1988: Ray Burgess
- 1982-1985: Ted (E N) White
- 1980-1982: J D McIntosh
- 1978-1980: Allen Finch
- 1976-1978: Graham (R G) Martyr
- 1972-1976: Major Horace Hockley

== Governance ==
The ISTC is managed by its council, with day-to-day running handled by a professional administration company. Members have the opportunity to contribute their ideas, skills and time to specific Steering Groups and can stand for Council.

The ISTC is a member of the Professional Associations Research Network (PARN). This organisation provides a network for professional bodies and offers services and events on subjects such as governance, Continuing Professional Development, ethics and standards, and member relations. The ISTC was one of the sponsors of a project in 2006 to explore the issues affecting professional associations as they grow.

The ISTC has a Code of Professional Practice, with which it expects its members to comply. This was developed in accordance with research carried out by PARN and its author was cited in PARN's third book on ethics.

== Membership ==
Technical communication encompasses a wide range of activities, all with the common thread of communicating complex or important information in the most effective way for the reader. Technical communicators create information that affects people in virtually every industry and area of society. Examples of roles that may be involved in technical communication are:

- Technical writing
- Technical illustration
- Indexing
- Editing
- Instructional design
- Information architecture
- Single source publishing
- Environmental, safety and health communication
- Management

The ISTC offers several grades of individual membership. There are two corporate grades, Member (MISTC) and Fellow (FISTC), and two non-corporate grades, Associate and Student. Corporate grades are entitled to vote at the ISTC's AGM. Members cite a sense of community as an important factor in their continued membership.

Organisations can join the ISTC as Business Affiliates.

== Publications ==
The ISTC publishes periodicals and books:

- a quarterly journal, Communicator (ISSN 0953-3699)
- a monthly newsletter, InfoPlus+
- a handbook comprising essays from a range of practitioners, Professional Communication and Information Design (ISBN 0-9506459-5-8)
- an overview of the role of XML in the profession, XML in Technical Communication.(ISBN 978-0-9506459-7-1)

== Events ==
The ISTC organises an annual conference, Technical Communication UK, which is held in September.

== Awards ==
The ISTC makes annual awards:

- UK Technical Communication Awards (formerly the ISTC Documentation Awards) for deliverables in five classes
- Horace Hockley Award for contribution to the profession
- Mike Austin Award for contribution to the ISTC

== International ==
The ISTC participates in the international technical communication profession through its membership of two umbrella organisations:

- INTECOM
- TCeurope

The ISTC was one of the founder members of both organisations, INTECOM in 1970 and TCeurope in 2002.
