= Component content management system =

System that manages content at a granular level

A component content management system (CCMS) is a content management system that manages content at a granular level (component) rather than at the document level. Each component represents a single topic, concept or asset (for example an image, table, product description, a procedure).

== Overview ==
The CCMS must be able to track "not only versions of topics and graphics but relationships among topics, graphics, maps, publications, and deliverables." More often than not, the CCMS also contains the publishing engine to create the final outputs for print, web and e-readers.

Components can be as large as a chapter or as small as a definition or even a word. Components in multiple content assemblies (content types) can be viewed as components or as traditional documents.

Various forms of XML are used in CCMSs to provide document and file structure. The most popular forms are SGML, XML and XHTML. Document format standards for these languages include:

- Darwin Information Typing Architecture (DITA) (generic)
- DocBook (generic)
- S1000D (defense, aerospace...)
- SCORM Shareable Content Object Reference Model (training and learning content)
- Office Open XML (the ISO/IEC 29500:2008 standard XML format used by e.g. Microsoft Word)

Challenges for the technical writers include topic-based authoring, that is, shifting from writing book-shaped, linear documentation to writing modular, structured and reusable content components.

Each component is only stored one time in the content management system, providing a single, trusted source of content (referential). These components are then reused (rather than copied and pasted) within a document or across multiple documents. This ensures that content is consistent across the entire documentation set. The use of components can also reduce the amount of time it takes to update and maintain content as changes only need to be made once, in one component.

Each component has its own lifecycle (owner, version, approval, use) and can be tracked individually or as part of an assembly. Component content management is typically used for multi-channel customer-facing content (marketing, usage, learning, support). The solution can be a separate system or be a functionality of another content management system type (for example, enterprise content management or web content management).

Unlike a "simple" management system, the CCMS tracks the components. It tracks indirect and direct linking so that the author can safely reuse content and check the applicability of changes.

== Benefits ==
Benefits of managing contents at components level:

1. Greater consistency and accuracy.
2. Reduced maintenance costs.
3. Reduced delivery costs.
4. Reduced translation costs.
5. Traceability.

Benefits of using a component content management system:

- Version and control over the documents and the contents - reused or not.
- Check impacts on reused content changes.
- Improved collaboration and automation with workflows.
- Manage documentation releases.
- Ease of links and content maintenance.
- Further reduce translation costs.
- Higher collaboration.
- Improved modularity.
- Integration with editors.

== Sources ==
- S1000D Official homepage
- OASIS Official DITA page
- Oasis Committee for DocBook
- SCORM
- The Language of Technical Communication, Ray Gallon, XML Press
