= IEEE Professional Communication Society =

Society of IEEE

The IEEE Professional Communication Society (IEEE ProComm) is a professional society of the Institute of Electrical and Electronics Engineers (IEEE). Its primary goals include helping engineers and technical writers to pursue further education and research in their fields, in addition to development of standards in technical communication. The society runs the annual IEEE International Professional Communication Conference, known as ProComm (formerly known as IPCC).

The IEEE Professional Communication Society has published a peer-reviewed journal known as the IEEE Transactions on Professional Communication since 1957.

== History ==
Formed in March 1957 as the IRE Professional Group on Engineering Writing, the group changed its name to the IRE Professional Group on Engineering Writing and Speech (April 1957), IEEE Professional Technical Group on Engineering Writing and Speech (1963), IEEE Group on Engineering Writing and Speech (1964), IEEE Group on Professional Communication (1971), and the IEEE Professional Communication Society (1978).

== Field of interest ==
The society states on its website that its field of interest includes "the study, preparation, production, delivery, use, improvement, and promotion of human communication in all media in engineering and other technical and professional environments". Its mission, related to this field, is to "foster a community dedicated to understanding and promoting effective communication in engineering, scientific, and other technical environments".
