= Story arc =

Extended or continuing storyline in episodic storytelling media

A story arc (also narrative arc) is the chronological construction of a plot in a novel, film, or episodic media like television, comic books, comic strips, board games, and video games. In an episodic show, a story arc unfolds over multiple episodes or seasons instead of resolving in a single installment.

Although multi-episode storylines have existed in serial fiction for centuries, one of the earliest recorded print usages of the term "story arc" appeared in 1973 in Time magazine regarding the film The Friends of Eddie Coyle: "He accomplishes this with no sacrifice to the pacing of his action sequences or the suspenseful development of his story's arc."

== Comic books and graphic novels ==
In American comic books, series are often split into four- to six-issue story arcs. This structure makes it easier to collect issues into trade paperbacks, which are simpler for casual readers to pick up than the decade-spanning continuity that traditionally defined the medium.

By contrast, earlier comics—such as mid-20th-century Superman titles by DC Comics—kept a fixed status quo where little permanent change occurred. Characters rarely grew, and storylines repeated over time in a loop rather than an evolving arc.

== Dramatic structure and purpose ==
The main purpose of a story arc is to move a character or situation from one state to another, bringing about real change in the story. This change often follows classic patterns, such as a tragic fall or a turn from weakness to strength.

A common framework for character-driven story arcs is the "hero's journey", outlined by Joseph Campbell in his 1949 book The Hero with a Thousand Faces. Screenwriter Christopher Vogler later adapted Campbell's model for Western screenwriting in The Writer's Journey: Mythic Structure for Writers.

== In television and radio ==
Serial storylines on radio and TV go back to early broadcast programming, especially radio serials and daytime soap operas. An early prime-time radio example was the 1946 NBC Radio summer drama The Fifth Horseman, which ran a four-episode arc about a fictional nuclear crisis.

Serialized shows historically struggled in traditional broadcast syndication, where episodes are sold individually and shown out of order. However, the rise of DVD box sets and streaming services made serialized shows much easier to follow, shifting industry standards toward longer story arcs.

Long serialized shows often use shorter sub-arcs to break up the narrative. Episodes outside the main arc (such as "villain of the week" stories) are known as standalone episodes, though fan communities sometimes call them "filler".

=== Usage in manga and anime ===
Manga and anime use story arcs heavily, with longer series often divided into distinct arcs by fans and publishers. Short series might tell a single story across their whole run, while longer series like One Piece, Naruto, Bleach, and Dragon Ball have multiple arcs, each built around a different main conflict or villain.

== See also ==
- Character arc
- Dramatic structure
- Frame story
- Limited series
- Miniseries
- Saga
- Serial
- Sjuzhet
- Storytelling
