= Superduperman =

- Superduperman from the original story.

Publication information
- Publisher: EC Comics
- First appearance: Mad #4 (April–May 1953)
- Created by: Harvey Kurtzman; Wally Wood

In-story information
- Alter ego: Clark Bent

"Superduperman" is a satirical story by Harvey Kurtzman and Wally Wood that was published in the fourth issue of Mad (April–May 1953). Lampooning both Superman and Captain Marvel, it revolutionized the types of stories seen in Mad, leading to greatly improved sales. Writers such as Alan Moore have cited this story as an influence.

== Publication history ==
After the eponymous eight-page story in Mad #4, the character made a cameo appearance in the comic's "Popeye" parody, "Poopeye" (Mad #21).

In 1968, Mad and DC Comics became part of the same corporate conglomerate, but this did not prevent the magazine from publishing spoofs of the Superman film series, including Superduperman (Mad #208, July 1979), Superduperman II (Mad #226, October 1981), and Stuporman ZZZ (Mad #243, December 1983).

== Characters and story ==
The plot parallels the Superman scenario of the period: "Clark Bent" is a lowly assistant to the copy boy at The Daily Dirt newspaper, where he tries, unsuccessfully, to woo the disgusted "Lois Pain". Meanwhile, an 'unknown monster' is stalking the streets of the city. Bent changes into Superduperman to help save the day, but "boy reporter Billy Spafon" reveals himself to be the monster, "Captain Marbles". Superduperman is unable to harm Captain Marbles until he provokes Marbles into punching himself in the head. Hoping this victory will be enough to sway Pain, he reveals his alter ego, only to be rejected again; the story closes with Pain's putdown: "Once a creep, always a creep".

Kurtzman's script subverts the admirable image of the superhero. Clark Bent uses his X-ray vision to peer into the women's bathroom, and Captain Marbles has abandoned good deeds for the pursuit of money. The conflict between the two characters also parodies the National Comics Publications v. Fawcett Publications trial.

== Reception ==
Until Mad #4, the magazine had not been one of EC's top-selling titles, but "Superduperman" revolutionized their format and led to sales success. In his book Comics, Manga, and Graphic Novels: A History of Graphic Narratives, Robert Petersen observes: "In April 1953, Mad #4 included a parody of Superman, ’Superduperman’, which originated a new formula that would significantly raise the popularity of the new magazine. Instead of broadly lampooning a genre of comics, 'Superduperman' levelled its sights on a specific and recognizable comic character".

National, the owners of Superman's copyright, threatened to file a lawsuit over the parody. EC and National shared the same lawyer, who advised Gaines to quit publishing parodies. While Gaines was weighing this advice, Kurtzman located a legal precedent that backed his and Mad's right to publish. Gaines hired the author of that precedent to write a brief substantiating EC's position, but the companies' shared lawyer disagreed, siding with National over EC. Gaines consulted a third lawyer, who advised Gaines to simply ignore the threat and continue publishing parodies. National never filed suit, and this legal cover established the basis for Kurtzman's new editorial direction that became the bedrock of Mad's humor.

== Influence ==
An online exhibition on the Billy Ireland Cartoon Library & Museum website states "Behind the silliness, the comic took a fresh look at superhero tales, exposing the adolescent male hero fantasy behind the characters. Further, it proved that anything in comics was fair game for parody, even the comics themselves." Academic Joseph W. Slade has described the story as "a cynical teenager’s envisioning of the legend: the only thing 'super' about this hero is his almost mindless destructiveness. It is not so much the spineless, decrepit Clark as the callous stupidity of his alter ego that demolishes the fantasy of a secret identity (one can also read the story as a critique of capitalism)." This approach to superheroes and comics would have a major impact beyond Mad itself.

When asked about the influence of Superfolks on his work, Alan Moore replied: "I'd still say that Harvey Kurtzman's Superduperman probably had the preliminary influence". He went into more detail in Kimota! the Miracleman Companion:

I remember being so knocked out by the "Superduperman" story that I immediately began thinking – I was 11, remember, so this would have been purely a comics strip for my own fun – but I thought maybe I could do a parody story about Marvelman. This thing is fair game to my 11-year-old mind. I wanted to do a super-hero parody story that was as funny as "Superduperman", but I thought it would be better if I did it about an English superhero".

However, with Watchmen, "[w]e wanted to take Superduperman 180 degrees – dramatic, instead of comedic", but it did also influence the art: "I think that we probably settled upon the kind of Wally Wood 'Superduperman' style. You know, super-heroics, lots of details, heavy blacks, of a distinctive style". Dave Gibbons, the artist on Watchmen, used to study the Superman art of Silver Age artists like Curt Swan, Wayne Boring and Al Plastino, "[t]hen I saw 'Superduperman,' drawn by Wally Wood. Faster than a speeding bullet, he became my favourite Superman artist." He concluded "Certainly, when comics genius Alan Moore and I got our chance to work on Superman, it was to Superduperman we looked. And it is unlikely that Watchmen, though widely thought of as grim'n'gritty, would have been the same without the skewed view that Howard Kurtzman and his cronies showed us way back when."

The story would also influence John Shelton Lawrence. As a child he dressed as a superhero and got himself into trouble but "[h]is understanding of superpowers matured, however, when he read Mad Magazine's' "Superduperman" in the early 1950s. That teenage skepticism grew into a philosophical teaching career, resulting in his current position as a professor of philosophy, emeritus, at Morningside College in Iowa. With Robert Jewert, he developed his suspicion that America's righteous stance in the world often projects the story of the selfless crusader who can cleanly use superpowers to rescue the innocent". These ideas would be expanded in their books The American Monomyth (1977), The Myth of the American Superhero (2002), and Captain America and the Crusade Against Evil: The Dilemma of Zealous Nationalism (2003).

That same year, Warner Bros. released their own parody, Stupor Duck, which was another in a series of cartoons depicting Daffy Duck doing a parody of another character. The story has "Cluck Trent" squaring off against supervillain "Aardvark Ratnik," although neither Cluck Trent nor Stupor Duck are aware that Ratnik is merely a character in a TV show.

Don Glut made, and starred in, a Superduperman fan film in 1963:

As Captain Marvel turned out unintentionally funny, I thought I'd try making a superhero movie in which the humor was deliberate. This time I turned to the Man of Steel, or at least a well-known parody of him. ... Although I know I could not hope to duplicate the scope of the Mad story, I wanted to at least attempt capturing on film some of its flavor. And so, in the fall of 1962, I shot a very short color send-up titled Superduperman.

== Collected editions ==
The story has been collected into the following volumes:

- Mad About Super Heroes (edited by Nick Meglin and John Ficarra, Mad Books, 2002, hardcover, ISBN 978-0760779507, trade paperback, ISBN 978-1563898860) includes:
  - "Superduperman!" (Mad #4)
  - "Superduperman" (Mad #208)
  - "Superduperman II" (Mad #226)
  - "Stuporman ZZZ" (Mad #243)

== See also ==
- History of Mad
- Wonder Wart-Hog, another Superman parody
