= Narrative thread =

Sequence of situations in narrative theory

A narrative thread, or plot thread (or, more ambiguously, a storyline), refers to particular elements and techniques of writing to center the story in the action or experience of characters rather than to relate a matter in a dry "all-knowing" sort of narration. Thus, the narrative threads experienced by different, but specific characters or sets of characters are those seen in the eyes of those characters that together form a plot element or subplot in the work of fiction. In this sense, each narrative thread is the narrative portion of a work that pertains to the world view of the participating characters cognizant of their piece of the whole. These characters may be the villains, the protagonists, a supporting character, or a relatively disinterested official utilized by the author, each thread of which is woven together by the writer to create a work.

By utilizing different threads, the writer enables the reader to get pieces of the overall plot while positioning them to identify with the characters or experience the situation as if the reader were part of or eavesdropping upon the action the writer is divulging. This aids in the suspension of disbelief and engages the reader into the story as it develops.

== Structure ==
A classic structure of narrative thread often used in both fiction and non-fiction writing is the monomyth, or hero's journey, with a beginning, a middle, and an end. First, typically the harmony of daily life is broken by a particularly dramatic event that leads into the main story. Then, second, the plot builds to a point of no return, from where the protagonist – who need not be a person but may be an organization or a community – has no choice but to deal with matters, and thus is tested. At this point, characteristically, there is conflict and the conflict intensifies. Third, and finally, harmony is reestablished by the conflict being solved, or at least explained in the case of non-fiction.

== See also ==
- Story arc
