= Polti =

Polti may refer to:

- Team Polti, an Italian cycling team (1994 to 2000)
- Polti–Kometa, an Italian cycling team (2018 to present)
- Georges Polti, a French author
