= Richard A. E. North =

British blogger and author (born 1948)

Richard Anthony Edward North (born 1948) is a British environmental health officer, political researcher, and blogger. He has published books on defence and agriculture. He was previously the research director in the European Parliament for the now-defunct political grouping Europe of Democracies and Diversities, which included the UK Independence Party (UKIP).

North has collaborated with the late journalist Christopher Booker on climate change, public health and other issues. He co-wrote a number of books with Booker, and collaborated with Booker's journalism.

== Background ==
North had "a brief career in the Royal Air Force" before becoming a local government officer, and then for two decades ran his own consultancy business. A 1994 contribution to the Institute of Economic Affairs's journal Economic Affairs described him as "an independent food safety adviser". "He then moved into trade politics and thence to the European Parliament as research director for the group of European Democracies and Diversities", a grouping of eurosceptic political groups which existed from 1999 to 2004, in which the UK Independence Party (UKIP) participated. At the European Parliament in Strasbourg, North shared an office with UKIP's leader Nigel Farage.

He completed a PhD on public sector food-poisoning surveillance at Leeds Metropolitan University in the 1990s.

North stood for the Referendum Party in the 1997 election, in South Derbyshire, having joined the party in 1996. In the 2004 European elections, North was UKIP's number one candidate on the party list for the Yorkshire region, until he was supplanted by Godfrey Bloom, who won a seat. North later resigned from UKIP, describing his service for the party as "optimism, descending into frustration, to disillusionment and to betrayal".

== European Union ==
=== Contributions ===
He began collaborating with the journalist Christopher Booker in the early 1990s, co-publishing on a range of issues, including the European Union. Their works advance a popular though academically disputed historiography of the UK's membership of the European Union. Their first book, The Mad Officials: How The Bureaucrats Are Strangling Britain (1994), focused on EU regulation in the UK, and was followed by The Castle of Lies: Why Britain Must get Out of Europe (1996) and The Great Deception: Can the European Union Survive? (2005). In 2004, he published a Bruges Group paper on the European Union's Galileo satellite navigation system.

North's blog, eureferendum.com, reached third place on the Technorati list of most influential blogs in the UK for 2006.

In a post on his eureferendum.com blog, in May 2015, North called on supporters of the UK withdrawing from the EU to contact him with the aim of forming a volunteer unit to "monitor, add, and edit" Wikipedia content to be more favourable to their views. Furthermore, he claimed that Wikipedia's "wrong" coverage of climate change, of which North is a notable denier, proved the need for such endeavors.

Since the Brexit referendum of 2016, the EU Referendum blog has grown increasingly critical of perceived shortcomings of the UK Government in the negotiating process, including its failures to acknowledge the difficult trade-offs necessary in the negotiations and the refusal of the UK authorities to engage with Flexcit, or a path like EEA/EFTA membership, in exchange for a "No Deal" exit.

=== Flexcit ===
North is the original author and main proponent of Flexcit (standing for "Flexible Continuous Exit"), a policy suggestion involving gradual British disengagement from the European Union. It has been claimed by Andrew Orlowski of The Register that Flexcit became a point of reference for civil servants.

Flexcit argues that exit from the EU is "a process rather than an event", so advocating a phased repatriation of powers, which has been described as "Brexit lite". The document proposes that Britain should retain membership of the European Economic Area by rejoining the European Free Trade Association, often called the Norway option. Under the proposal, Britain would initially adopt the community acquis of the European Union, the accumulated legislation, legal acts, and court decisions which constitute the body of European Union law. North argues that under this approach to EU exit there would be very little visible consequence of Britain's change in status, either for the better or the worse. Further renegotiation of trade and governance would become a longer-term option.

North was one of seventeen shortlisted entrants invited to submit a full submission to the Institute of Economic Affairs's 2013 Brexit Prize competition. Entrants were asked to imagine an "out" vote in a proposed referendum on United Kingdom membership of the European Union and asked to compose a blueprint for the process of withdrawal, taking account of Britain's relationship to global governance and trade systems. His proposal reached the shortlist for the final. It became the official policy of Arron Banks' Leave.EU campaign that vied unsuccessfully for official recognition as the official Leave campaign.

=== Reception of the academic community ===
The EU politics writer and blogger J. Clive Matthews has argued that North is guilty of "pandering to his audience’s preconceptions and prejudices". A European Commission official and academic has argued that North and Booker are best seen as "latter-day pamphleteers", who "exaggerate their case", advancing an "all-embracing, Kafkaesque conspiracy, the "System", consisting of an evil partnership between Brussels and Whitehall". A review of North's co-authored book The Great Deception: Can the European Union Survive? (2005), in the academic journal The Historian described his "skewed portrayal" of European integration "against the will of a bamboozled European public", as "not so much false as ludicrous", noting "the book loses whatever credibility it accrues in its better chapters by its persistently exaggerated language". Another review, in the Prague-based academic journal Perspectives, praises the book's attempted scope, but accuses the authors of straying into "populism", and "lack[ing] objectivity", noting the book "should be read as an expression of one view of European integration rather than a well balanced academic source". The reviewer concludes by noting the importance of the book's influence on popular euroscepticsm in the UK, but warns readers to look elsewhere for "an objective information source".

Princeton University's Andrew Moravcsik, whose research is cited in the book, has accused the authors of "misconstruing" his work as supporting their narrative and failing to demonstrate that there were any viable alternatives to European Union membership, with Booker and North's economics being "even dodgier than their history". He further argues that their "Eurosceptic dogma" of an "undemocratic" scheme of centralised regulation" is undermined by their own examples; that it is largely "British officials exercising their own discretion" and juggling the fate of special interest groups against the wider economy.

Responding to a question on "Flexcit" by a supporter of North during a live Q&A on Reddit, the Jean Monnet Chair of EU Law at the University of Liverpool, Michael Dougan, noted that North's "academic work on EU law" was not known to him as it was not published in the mainstream international peer-reviewed journals for the field of European legal studies. Dougan suggested further that it does not meet the "internationally recognised" standards for the discipline.

== Health ==
North and Booker wrote a special edition for Private Eye on the 2001 United Kingdom foot-and-mouth outbreak, describing the subsequent merger of the Agriculture (MAFF) and Environment ministries to form the Department for Environment, Food and Rural Affairs (DEFRA) as the "most cynical makeover since Windscale changed its name to Sellafield".

More recently, North collaborated with Booker on Scared To Death: From BSE To Global Warming, Why Scares Are Costing Us The Earth (2007), a study of the part played in Western society in recent decades by the "scare phenomenon".

== Defence ==
North's 2009 sole-author book, Ministry of Defeat 2003–2009: The British in Iraq, was reviewed in the Daily Telegraph. North also blogs on defence matters and is credited by Booker with early contributions to the criticism of the Ministry of Defence's use of under-protected Land Rovers in Afghanistan. In 2003, he published a Centre for Policy Studies paper on UK defence policy.

== Climate change ==
North has written about and commented on climate change from a sceptical position, including co-authoring (with Christopher Booker) Climategate to Cancun: The Real Global Warming Disaster Continues..., the followup to Booker's The Real Global Warming Disaster. North also collaborated with Booker in January 2010 on what Booker dubbed "Amazongate", when North showed that an IPCC claim that 40 percent of the Amazonian forests could react drastically to "even a slight reduction in precipitation" was sourced to a World Wildlife Fund report. While North was correct to point out that the report was not peer-reviewed scientific literature, it later became clear that there was evidence supporting the report's claim, and The Sunday Times printed an apology and retraction for an article based on material from North.

In December 2009, Booker and North published an article in The Sunday Telegraph in which they accused Rajendra Pachauri, chair of the Intergovernmental Panel on Climate Change (IPCC), of using his position for personal gain, with a follow-up Telegraph article in January 2010. According to George Monbiot, "The allegations ... were widely aired in the media and generally believed." On 21 August 2010, The Daily Telegraph issued an apology, and withdrew the December article from its website, having reportedly paid legal fees running into six figures. Pachauri described the original allegations as "another attempt by the climate sceptics to discredit the IPCC".

== Books ==
- (with Christopher Booker), The Mad Officials: How The Bureaucrats Are Strangling Britain (1994)
- (with Christopher Booker), The Castle of Lies: Why Britain Must get Out of Europe (1996)
- The death of British agriculture: the wanton destruction of a key industry, Gerald Duckworth and Company, 2001
- (with Christopher Booker), The Great Deception: Can the European Union Survive?, Continuum Publishing, 2005 (EU Referendum Edition was published by Bloomsbury Publishing PLC in April 2016)
- (with Christopher Booker), Scared to Death: From BSE to Global Warming: Why Scares are Costing Us the Earth, Continuum Publishing, 2007
- Ministry of Defeat 2003–2009: The British in Iraq 2003–2009, Continuum Publishing, 2009
- The Many Not the Few: The Stolen History of the Battle of Britain, Continuum Publishing, 2012
