= Executive producer =

Profession

Executive producer (EP) is one of the top positions in the production of media such as films, television, music, radio, or video games. In films, the executive producer generally contributes to the film's budget and their involvement depends on the project, with some simply securing funds and others being involved in the filmmaking process. In general, the film producer is more involved in the hands-on production of the film. In television, executive producers are sometimes involved with the production in a hands-on capacity, but their roles are highly variable. In music, the executive producer is responsible for business decisions. Depending on the medium, the executive producer may also be concerned with legal issues.

== Film ==
While the executive producer's core responsibility is financing the film, their operational role is project-dependent, ranging from passive financial backing to active creative collaboration. Executive producers may finance the film, participate in the creative effort, and/or work on set. Their responsibilities vary from funding or attracting investors into the movie project to legal, scripting, marketing, advisory and supervising capacities.

Executive producers vary in involvement, responsibility and power. Some executive producers have hands-on control over every aspect of production, some supervise the producers of a project, while others are involved in name only. In the UK, "An executive producer is the person who generally brings the concept to the commissioners,... makes sure finance is there and so on, but doesn't have a hand in the day-to-day running. They are ultimately being a figurehead for the programme, so the buck should stop with them".

The crediting of executive producers in the film industry has risen over time. In the mid-to-late 1990s, there were an average of just under two executive producers per film. In 2000, the number jumped to 2.5 (more than the number of standard "film producers"). In 2013, there were an average of 4.4 executive producers per film. One reason for the increase in executive producers per film is the desire to spread risk, whether due to increasing cost of film making for larger budget films, often met by multiple studios banding together, or alternatively the need to attract multiple smaller investors for lower budget independent films.

== Television ==
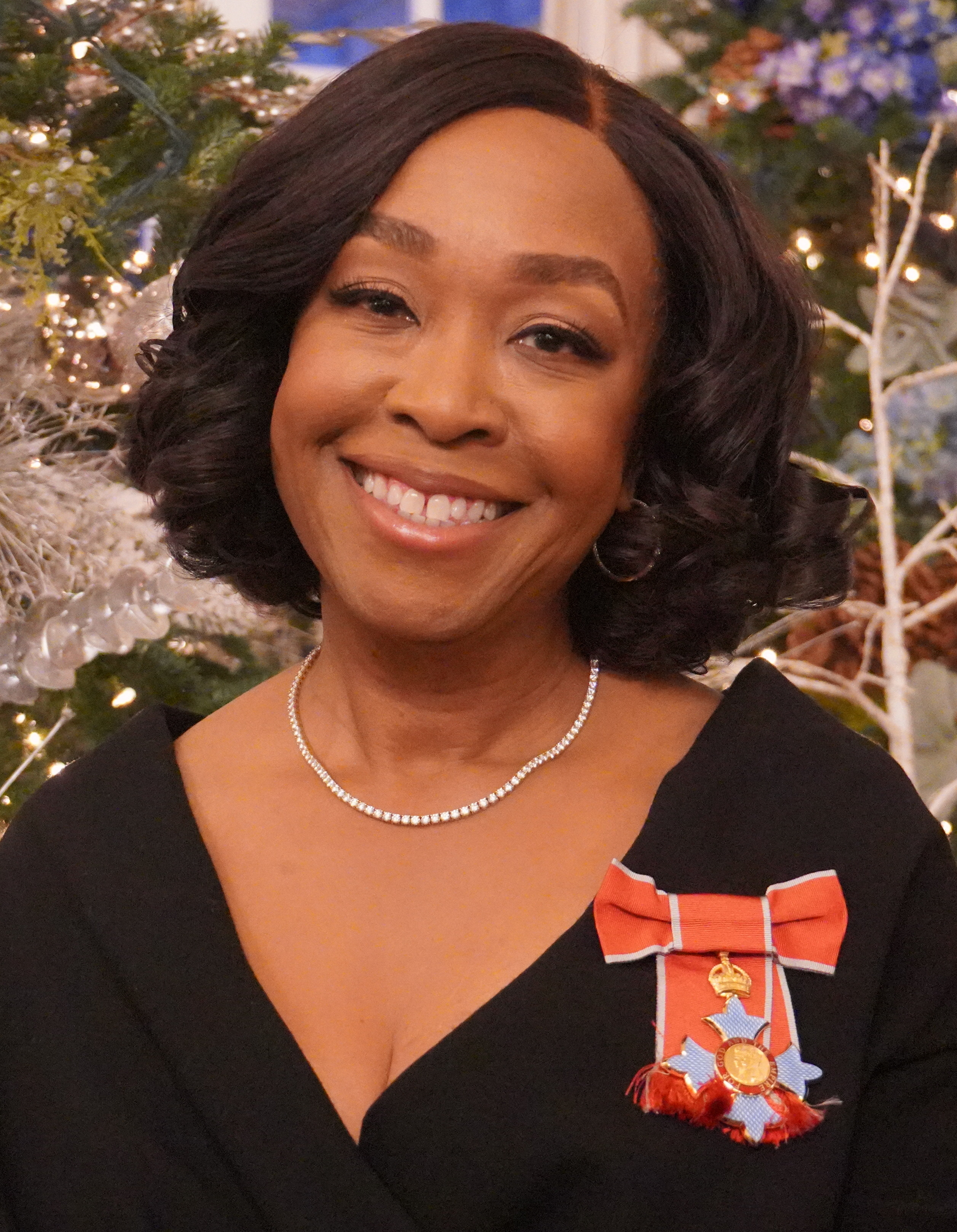
Shonda Rhimes, showrunner and executive producer for television series including Grey's Anatomy and Bridgerton

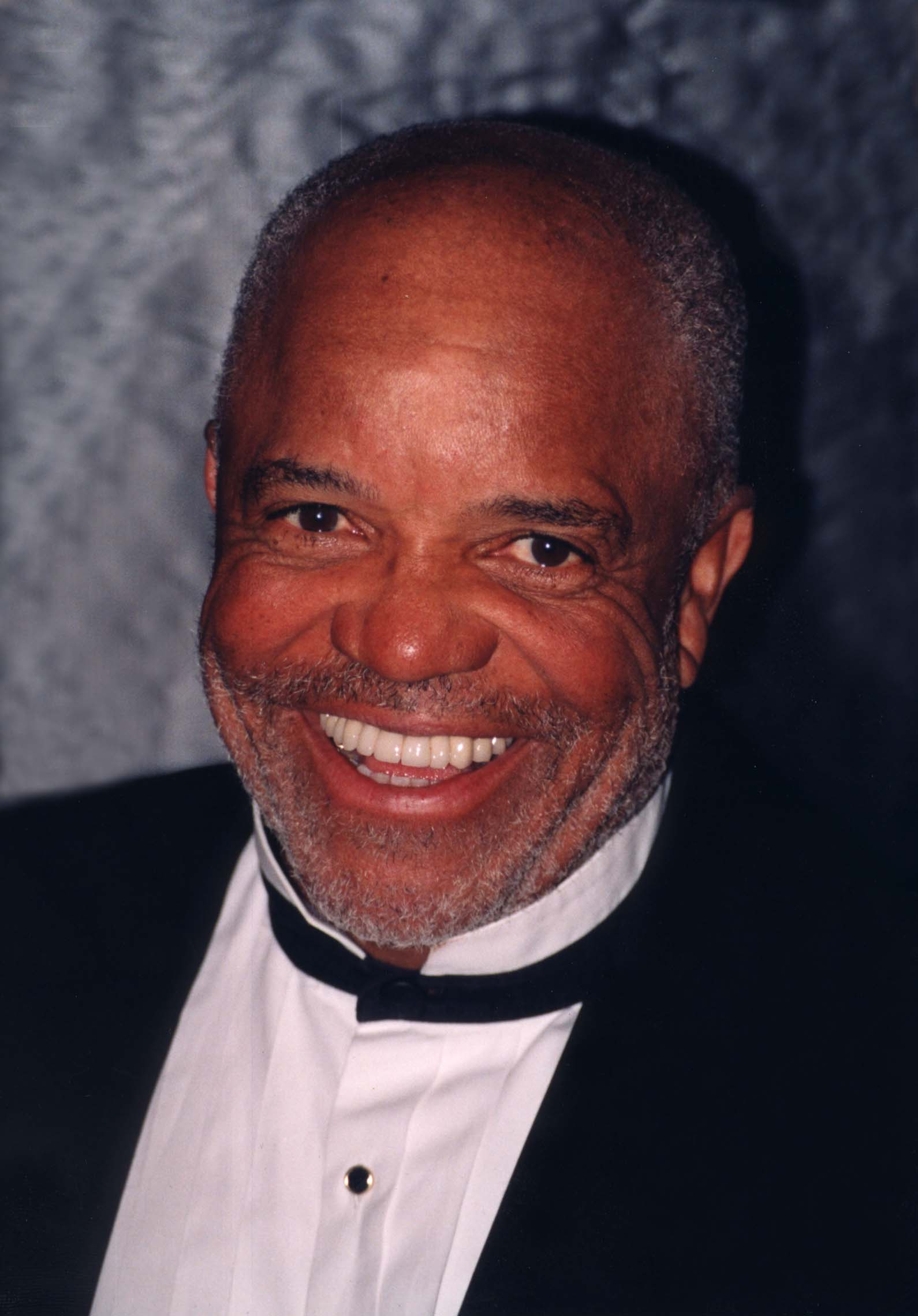
Berry Gordy, founder and executive producer for music record label Motown

In television, the executive producer credit is often applied to individuals who are involved with the production in a hands-on capacity; an executive producer usually supervises the creative content, plans and schedules the filming with the producer and team, and may be involved in the financial budgeting of a production. Many writers, like Aaron Sorkin, Stephen J. Cannell, Tina Fey, and Ryan Murphy, have worked as both the creator and the producer of the same show.

As in film, executive producer credits in television are also commonly applied to individuals who are involved in the production in a more hands-off capacity, such as the owner of the show's production company. Their degree of power and influence over the development of a product varies, with some more hands-on than others, and their legal responsibilities for the shows are highly variable. The title is sometimes nothing more than a "vanity title".

In the case of multiple executive producers on a television show, the one responsible for day-to-day production is usually called the showrunner, or the leading executive producer.

== Music ==
In recorded music, record labels distinguish between an executive producer and a record producer. The executive producer is responsible for business decisions and more recently, organizing the recordings along with the music producer, whereas the record producer makes the music. Sometimes the executive producer organizes the recording and selects recording-related crew, such as sound engineers and session musicians.

== Radio ==
An executive radio producer helps create, develop, and implement strategies to improve product and ratings.

== Video games ==
In the video game industry, the title "executive producer" is not well-defined. It may refer to an external producer working for the publisher, who works with the developers. For example, in 2012, Jay-Z was announced as executive producer for NBA 2K13. His role consisted of appearing in an introduction, picking songs for the game's soundtrack and contributing to the designs of its in-game menus "and other visual elements".

== See also ==
- Creative executive
- Development executive
- Line producer
- Music supervisor
- Senior producer
- Studio executive
- Unit production manager
