= Matthew Kapell =

American historian and anthropologist

Matthew Wilhelm Kapell is a historian and anthropologist, with master's degrees in each discipline, who has a Ph.D. in American Studies.

Early in his career he co-authored chapters on the genetics of human growth and the effects of poverty on growth. The majority of this work appeared while he taught anthropology at the University of Michigan–Dearborn. Included among these are essays published mainly in edited European and Indian (Asia) works attacking ideas of genetic factors in determining development of height and body shape. Other publications include works on the computer game Civilization, Holocaustal images in Star Trek: Deep Space Nine, the American speculative fiction and socialist writer Mack Reynolds re-working of the Utopian fiction of Edward Bellamy, and Christian Romance fiction.

Kapell has also published a number of essays in the journal Extrapolation, and elsewhere, on speculative fiction in the United States as intellectual history. His work in history is mainly focused American frontier ideology in the contemporary period, though he has also published on the representation of race in the Detroit media during World War II and the legal history of British colonial marriage law in Africa.

Kapell was educated at Schoolcraft College, The University of Michigan–Dearborn, Wayne State University, all in Michigan, United States, and at Swansea University, Wales, UK.

He is best known for his work in media studies and frontier ideology in American history.

== Frontier Ideology in American History ==
Kapell's book Exploring the Next Frontier: Vietnam, NASA, Star Trek and Utopia in 1960s and 1970s American Myth and History, from the academic publisher Routledge, examines notions of the frontier in American culture during the 1960s and 1970s. It specifically covers the American cultural reactions to the Vietnam War through the work novelist of Joe Haldeman, the NASA lunar missions, the television show Star Trek and Gerard K. O'Neill's concept of space colonization called the "High Frontier."

== Film and Television Studies ==
He has published four edited academic volumes on popular culture, film, and television. The first, (with William G. Doty) is Jacking In to the Matrix Franchise: Cultural Reception and Interpretation (2004). The second is (with John Shelton Lawrence) Finding the Force of the Star Wars Franchise: Fans, Merchandise, and Critics (2006) and adds Wilhelm to his name. In 2010 Kapell published Star Trek as Myth: Essays on Symbol and Archetype at the Final Frontier and, working with British scholar Stephen McVeigh, Kapell edited The Films of James Cameron: Critical Essays in 2011. In 2015, with Ace G. Pilkington, Kapell edited The Fantastic Made Visible: Essays on the Adaption of Science Fiction and Fantasy From Page to Screen examining works by authors such as William Shakespeare, Isaac Asimov, Robert A. Heinlein and franchises such as Planet of the Apes and Snow White. All of the volumes provide multiple essays by academics and others on different cultural interpretations on the films and franchises under examination while Kapell's conclusion essays tend to emphasize myth.

== Game Studies ==
Kapell's 2013 edited book, Playing with the Past: Digital Games and the Simulation of History (Co-edited with Andrew B.R. Elliott; Bloomsbury) was called a “groundbreaking work in Media Studies and an essential text for the study of video games and the history of ideas” by C. Jason Smith in a pre-publication blurb. An examination of multiple digital (computer and console) games that confront historical narratives it contains chapters on Ancient, contemporary, Western and non-Western history, and utopian futures. It also examines different theories of historiographical understanding from multiple perspectives. His 2015 book, edited alone, is The Play Versus Story Divide in Game Studies: Critical Essays. It examines the debate in Game Studies around ludology and narratology as paradigms for examining digital games.
