= The Great Deception: Can the European Union Survive? =

2005 book

- Author: Christopher Booker; Richard A. E. North
- Language: English
- Subject: European Union
- Genre: Non-fiction
- Publication date: 2005

The Great Deception: Can the European Union Survive? is a book written by the journalist Christopher Booker and the researcher Richard A. E. North, written in 2005 with an update published in 2016 for the European Referendum.

The argument is that British membership in the EU is a “slow-motion coup d’etat” with an “agenda of subordination” to invasive centralised regulation that is economically harmful to the UK.

A review of the book in the academic journal The Historian described his "skewed portrayal" of European integration "against the will of a bamboozled European public", as "not so much false as ludicrous", noting "the book loses whatever credibility it accrues in its better chapters by its persistently exaggerated language." Another review, in the Prague-based academic journal Perspectives, praises the book's attempted scope, but accuses the authors of straying into "populism", and "lack[ing] objectivity", noting the book "should be read as an expression of one view of European integration rather than a well balanced academic source". The reviewer concludes by noting the importance of the book's influence on popular euroscepticsm in the UK, but warns readers to look elsewhere for "an objective information source".

Princeton University's Andrew Moravcsik, whose research is heavily cited in the book, has accused the authors of "misconstruing" his work as supporting their narrative and failing to demonstrate that there were any viable alternatives to European Union membership, with Booker and North's economics being "even dodgier than their history". He further argues that their "Eurosceptic dogma" of an ""undemocratic" scheme of centralised regulation" is undermined by their own examples; that it is largely "British officials exercising their own discretion" and juggling the fate of special interest groups against the wider economy.
