= Christopher Vogler =

Screenwriter and author in Missouri, US

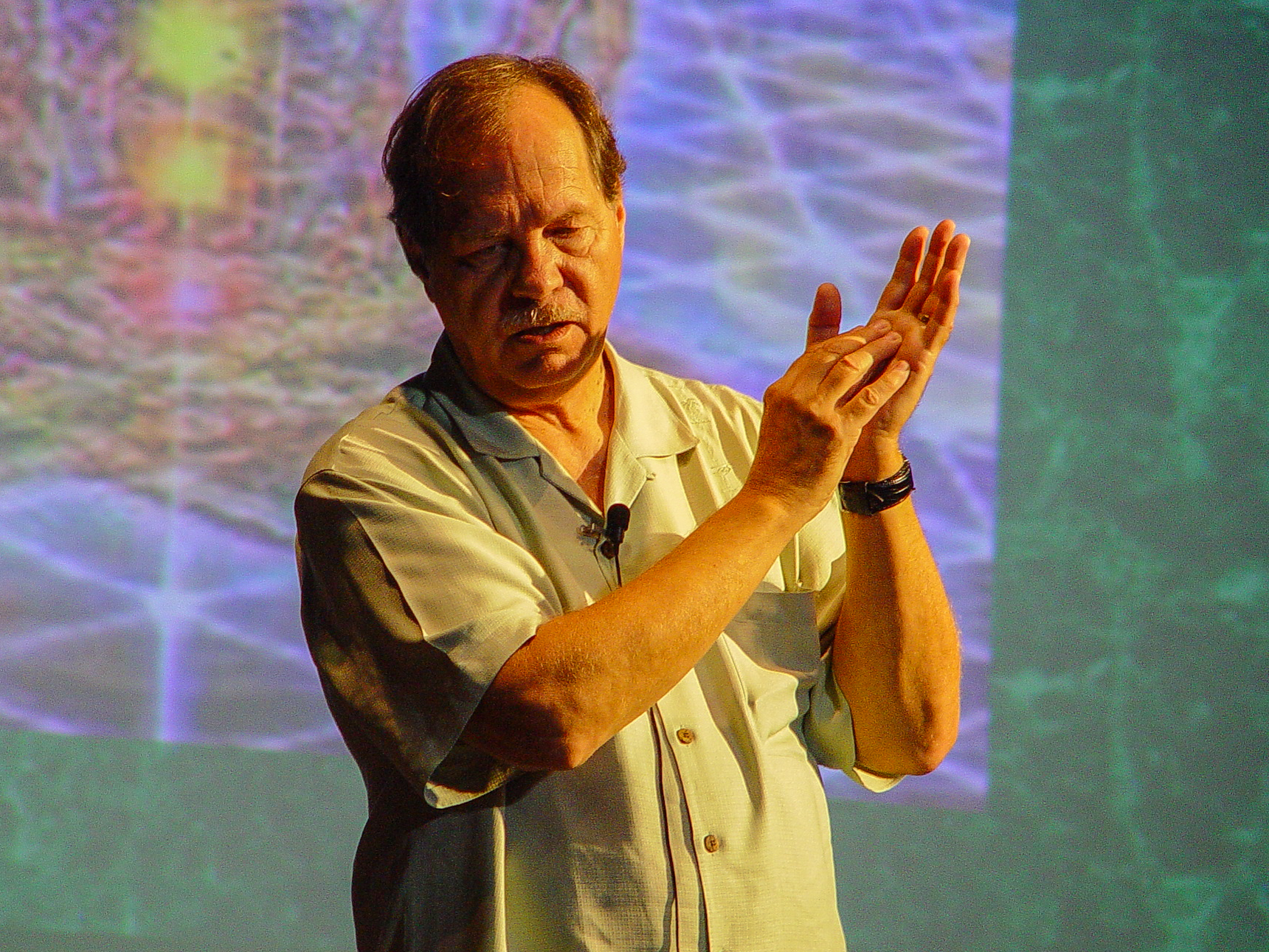
- Vogler lecturing in Tel Aviv, Israel in 2014
- Born: 1949 (age 76–77); Missouri, United States
- Education: USC School of Cinema-Television
- Occupations: Development executive; screenwriter; author
- Writing career
- Notable works: The Writer's Journey: Mythic Structure For Writers; The Lion King

Christopher Vogler (born 1949) is a Hollywood development executive, screenwriter, author, and educator. He is best known for working with Disney and his screenwriting guide, The Writer's Journey: Mythic Structure For Writers ( 2007).

== Career ==
Vogler was born in Missouri and studied filmmaking at the USC School of Cinema-Television in Los Angeles. He has worked for Disney studios, Fox 2000 Pictures, and Warner Bros. in the development department. He contributed story material for the Disney animated feature The Lion King.

He has taught at the USC School of Cinema-Television, Division of Animation and Digital Arts in addition to the UCLA extension. He is the president of a company, Storytech Literary Consulting company, which he founded in 1999. The vice president of SLC, Brad Schreiber, consults on scripts and books, using Vogler's approach.

== Campbell and Writer's Journey ==
Vogler was inspired by the writings of mythologist Joseph Campbell, particularly The Hero with a Thousand Faces, which covers the Hero's Journey archetype in classical mythology. Vogler used Campbell's work to create a company memo of seven pages for Hollywood screenwriters, A Practical Guide to The Hero with a Thousand Faces. Vogler later developed it into The Writer's Journey: Mythic Structure for Storytellers and Screenwriters in 1992, and The Writer's Journey: Mythic Structure For Writers (ISBN 978-1-932907-36-0). Since then he spun off his techniques into worldwide master classes.
