= The Hero with a Thousand Faces =

1949 book on comparative mythology by Joseph Campbell

- Cover of the third printing, 1972
- Author: Joseph Campbell
- Language: English
- Subject: Mythology
- Published: 1949 (Pantheon Books); 1968 (2nd ed.); 2008 (3rd ed.)
- Publication place: United States
- Media type: Print (hardcover and paperback)
- ISBN: 978-1-57731-593-3
- Dewey Decimal: 201/.3 22
- LC Class: BL313 .C28 2008

The Hero with a Thousand Faces (first published in 1949) is a work of comparative mythology by Joseph Campbell, in which the author discusses his theory of the mythological structure of the journey of the archetypal hero found in world myths.

Since the publication of The Hero with a Thousand Faces, Campbell's theory has been consciously applied by a wide variety of modern writers and artists. Filmmaker George Lucas acknowledged Campbell's theory in mythology, and its influence on the Star Wars films.

The Joseph Campbell Foundation and New World Library issued a new edition of The Hero with a Thousand Faces in July 2008 as part of the Collected Works of Joseph Campbell series of books, audio and video recordings. In 2011, Time named it among the 100 most influential books written in English since 1923.

== Summary ==
Campbell explores the theory that mythological narratives frequently share a fundamental structure. The similarities of these myths brought Campbell to write his book in which he details the structure of the monomyth. He calls the motif of the archetypal narrative, "the hero's adventure". In a well-known passage from the introduction to The Hero with a Thousand Faces, Campbell summarizes the monomyth:

A hero ventures forth from the world of common day into a region of supernatural wonder: fabulous forces are there encountered and a decisive victory is won: the hero comes back from this mysterious adventure with the power to bestow boons on his fellow man.

In laying out the monomyth, Campbell describes a number of stages or steps along this journey. "The hero's adventure" begins in the ordinary world. He must depart from the ordinary world, when he receives a call to adventure. With the help of a mentor, the hero will cross a guarded threshold, leading him to a supernatural world, where familiar laws and order do not apply. There, the hero will embark on a road of trials, where he is tested along the way. The archetypal hero is sometimes assisted by allies. As the hero faces the ordeal, he encounters the greatest challenge of the journey. Upon rising to the challenge, the hero will receive a reward, or boon. Campbell's theory of the monomyth continues with the inclusion of a metaphorical death and resurrection. The hero must then decide to return with this boon to the ordinary world. The hero then faces more trials on the road back. Upon the hero's return, the boon or gift may be used to improve the hero's ordinary world, in what Campbell calls, the application of the boon.

While many myths do seem to follow the outline of Campbell's monomyth, there is some variance in the inclusion and sequence of some of the stages. Still, there is an abundance of literature and folklore that follows the motif of the archetypal narrative, paralleling the more general steps of "Departure" (sometimes called Separation), "Initiation", and "Return". "Departure" deals with the hero venturing forth on the quest, including the call to adventure. "Initiation" refers to the hero's adventures that will test him along the way. The last part of the monomyth is the "Return", which follows the hero's journey home.

Campbell studied religious, spiritual, mythological and literary classics including the stories of Osiris, Prometheus, the Buddha, Moses, Mohammed, and Jesus. The book cites the similarities of the stories, and references them as he breaks down the structure of the monomyth.

The book includes a discussion of "the hero's journey" by using the Freudian concepts popular in the 1940s and 1950s. Campbell's theory incorporates a mixture of Jungian archetypes, unconscious forces, and Arnold van Gennep's structuring of rites of passage rituals to provide some illumination. "The hero's journey" continues to influence artists and intellectuals in contemporary arts and culture, suggesting a basic usefulness for Campbell's insights beyond mid-20th century forms of analysis.

== Background ==
Campbell used the work of early-20th-century theorists to develop his model of the hero (see also structuralism), including Freud (particularly the Oedipus complex), Carl Jung (archetypal figures and the collective unconscious), and Arnold Van Gennep. Van Gennep contributed the concept of there being three stages of The Rites of Passage. Campbell translated this into Separation, Initiation and Return. He also looked to the work of psychoanalyst Otto Rank and ethnographers James George Frazer and Franz Boas.

Campbell was a noted scholar of James Joyce, having co-authored A Skeleton Key to Finnegans Wake with Henry Morton Robinson. Campbell borrowed the term monomyth from Joyce's Finnegans Wake. In addition, Joyce's Ulysses was also highly influential in the structuring of the archetypal motif.

=== Publishing history ===
Cover of reprints of the book, featuring an image at bottom of Mark Hamill as Luke Skywalker in the film Star Wars

The book was originally published by the Bollingen Foundation through Pantheon Press as the seventeenth title in the Bollingen Series. This series was taken over by Princeton University Press, who published the book through 2006. Originally issued in 1949 and revised by Campbell in 1968, The Hero with a Thousand Faces has been reprinted a number of times. Reprints issued after the release of Star Wars in 1977 used the image of Mark Hamill as Luke Skywalker on the cover. Princeton University Press issued a commemorative printing of the second edition in 2004 on the occasion of the joint centennial of Campbell's birth and the Press's founding with an added foreword by Clarissa Pinkola Estés.

A third edition, compiled by the Joseph Campbell Foundation and published by New World Library, was released as the twelfth title in the Collected Works of Joseph Campbell series in July 2008.

The Hero with a Thousand Faces has been translated into over twenty languages, including Spanish, Portuguese, French, German, Italian, Japanese, Korean, Chinese (simplified and traditional), Turkish, Dutch, Greek, Danish, Norwegian, Persian, Polish, Romanian, Czech, Croatian, Serbian, Slovenian, Russian, Hungarian, Bulgarian and Hebrew, and has sold well over a million copies worldwide.

== Artists influenced by the work ==
In Pathways to Bliss: Mythology and Personal Transformation, a book drawn from Campbell's late lectures and workshops, he says about artists and the monomyth:

Artists are magical helpers. Evoking symbols and motifs that connect us to our deeper selves, they can help us along the heroic journey of our own lives. [...]

The artist is meant to put the objects of this world together in such a way that through them you will experience that light, that radiance which is the light of our consciousness and which all things both hide and, when properly looked upon, reveal. The hero's journey is one of the universal patterns through which that radiance shows brightly. What I think is that a good life is one hero journey after another. Over and over again, you are called to the realm of adventure, you are called to new horizons. Each time, there is the same problem: do I dare? And then if you do dare, the dangers are there, and the help also, and the fulfillment or the fiasco. There's always the possibility of a fiasco.

But there's also the possibility of bliss.

— Joseph Campbell,

=== Influences on artists ===
The Hero with a Thousand Faces has influenced a number of artists, filmmakers, musicians, producers and poets. Some of these figures include Bob Dylan, George Lucas, Mark Burnett and Jim Morrison. Additionally, Mickey Hart, Bob Weir, and Jerry Garcia of the Grateful Dead had long noted Campbell's influence and participated in a seminar with Campbell in 1986, entitled "From Ritual to Rapture".

==== In film ====
Stanley Kubrick introduced Arthur C. Clarke to the book during the writing of 2001: A Space Odyssey.

George Lucas' deliberate use of Campbell's theory of the monomyth in the making of the Star Wars movies is well documented. On the DVD release of the famous colloquy between Campbell and Bill Moyers, filmed at Lucas' Skywalker Ranch and broadcast in 1988 on PBS as The Power of Myth, Campbell and Moyers discussed Lucas's use of The Hero with a Thousand Faces in making his films. Lucas himself discussed how Campbell's work affected his approach to storytelling and film-making.

==== In games ====
Jenova Chen, lead designer at thatgamecompany, also cites The Hero's Journey as the primary inspiration for the PlayStation 3 game Journey (2012).

==== In literature ====
Christopher Vogler, a Hollywood film producer and writer, wrote a memo for Disney Studios on the use of The Hero with a Thousand Faces as a guide for scriptwriters; this memo influenced the creation of such films as Beauty and the Beast (1991), Aladdin (1992), and The Lion King (1994). Vogler later expanded the memo and published it as the book The Writer's Journey: Mythic Structure For Writers, which became the inspiration for a number of successful Hollywood films and is believed to have been used in the development of the Matrix series.

Novelist Richard Adams acknowledges a debt to Campbell's work, and specifically to the concept of the monomyth. In his best known work, Watership Down, Adams uses extracts from The Hero with a Thousand Faces as chapter epigrams.

Author Neil Gaiman, whose work is frequently seen as exemplifying the monomyth structure, says that he started The Hero with a Thousand Faces but refused to finish it:

"I think I got about half way through The Hero with a Thousand Faces and found myself thinking if this is true—I don't want to know. I really would rather not know this stuff. I’d rather do it because it's true and because I accidentally wind up creating something that falls into this pattern than be told what the pattern is."

Many scholars and reviewers have noted how closely J. K. Rowling's popular Harry Potter books hewed to the monomyth schema.

==== In television ====
Dan Harmon, the creator of the TV shows Community and Rick and Morty, has used the monomyth as inspiration for his work.

== Reception ==
David R. Dunham reviewed The Hero with a Thousand Faces for Different Worlds magazine and stated that "The Hero with a Thousand Faces is not an easy book to read. While it isn't overly dry, it isn't exactly entertaining, either. It took me three starts to get through it. This may be due to the fact that I don't usually read scholarly books for entertainment."

== See also ==
- The Golden Bough by James George Frazer
- The Iron Dream by Norman Spinrad
- The Seven Basic Plots by Christopher Booker
- Archetypal literary criticism
- Vladimir Propp
- Aarne–Thompson classification systems
- Bildungsroman
- The Myth of the Birth of the Hero by Otto Rank
- Kishu ryūritan

== Bibliography ==
- Campbell, Joseph. The Hero's Journey: Joseph Campbell on His Life and Work. Edited and with an Introduction by Phil Cousineau. Foreword by Stuart L. Brown, Executive Editor. New York: Harper and Row, 1990.
- Campbell, Joseph and Henry Morton Robinson. A Skeleton Key to Finnegans Wake, 1944.
- Campbell, Joseph. The Hero with a Thousand Faces. 1st edition, Bollingen Foundation, 1949. 2nd edition, Princeton University Press. 3rd edition, New World Library, 2008.
- Campbell, Joseph. Pathways to Bliss: Mythology and Personal Transformation. Edited by David Kudler. Novato, California: New World Library, 2004.
- Ford, Clyde W. The Hero with an African Face. New York: Bantam, 2000.
- Henderson, Mary. Star Wars: The Magic of Myth. Companion volume to the exhibition at the National Air and Space Museum of the Smithsonian Institution. New York: Bantam, 1997.
- Larsen, Stephen and Robin Larsen. Joseph Campbell: A Fire in the Mind. Rochester, Vermont: Inner Traditions, 2002.
- Manganaro, Marc. Myth, Rhetoric, and the Voice of Authority: A Critique of Frazer, Eliot, Frye, and Campbell. New Haven: Yale, 1992.
- Moyers, Bill and Joseph Campbell. The Power of Myth. Anchor: Reissue edition, 1991. ISBN 0-385-41886-8
- Pearson, Carol and Katherine Pope. The Female Hero in American and British Literature. New York: R.R. Bowker, 1981.
- Vogler, Christopher. The Writer's Journey: Mythic Structure For Writers. Studio City, CA: Michael Wiese Productions, 1998.
