= The Seven Basic Plots =

2004 book by Christopher Booker

- Author: Christopher Booker
- Language: English
- Published: 2004
- Pages: 736
- ISBN: 978-0826452092
- OCLC: 57641576
- Dewey Decimal: 809/.924
- LC Class: PN3378 .B65 2004
- Preceded by: The Great Deception
- Followed by: Scared to Death: From BSE to Global Warming

The Seven Basic Plots: Why We Tell Stories is a 2004 book by Christopher Booker that offers a Jungian‑influenced analysis of stories and their psychological significance. Booker worked on the book for thirty‑four years.

== Summary ==
=== The Meta‑Plot ===
The meta‑plot opens with an anticipation stage, in which the hero is summoned to the adventure that lies ahead. This is followed by a dream stage, during which the adventure begins, the hero meets with some success and falls under an illusion of invincibility. The next phase is a frustration stage, in which the hero confronts the enemy for the first time and the illusion of invincibility is shattered. Matters deepen in the nightmare stage, the climax of the plot, where hope appears to be lost. Finally, at the resolution, the hero triumphs over adversity against all odds.

The central thesis of the book states: “However many characters may appear in a story, its real concern is with just one: its hero. It is the one whose fate we identify with, as we see them gradually developing towards that state of self‑realisation which marks the end of the story. Ultimately it is in relation to this central figure that all other characters in a story take on their significance. What each of the other characters represents is really only some aspect of the inner state of the hero himself.”

=== The plots ===
==== Overcoming the Monster ====
The protagonist sets out to defeat an antagonistic force (often evil) that threatens the protagonist and/or protagonist's homeland.

Examples: Perseus, Theseus, Beowulf (anonymous), Dracula (Bram Stoker), The War of the Worlds (H.G. Wells), Nicholas Nickleby (Charles Dickens), The Guns of Navarone (Alistair McLean), Seven Samurai and The Magnificent Seven, James Bond (Ian Fleming), Jaws, Star Wars: A New Hope, Naruto, Harry Potter (J.K. Rowling)

==== Rags to Riches ====
The poor protagonist acquires power, wealth, and/or a mate, loses it all and gains it back, growing as a person as a result.

Examples: Cinderella, Aladdin, Jane Eyre (Charlotte Brontë), A Little Princess (Frances Hodgson Burnett), Great Expectations (Charles Dickens), David Copperfield (Charles Dickens), Moll Flanders (Daniel Defoe), The Red and the Black (Stendhal), The Prince and the Pauper (Mark Twain), "The Ugly Duckling" (Hans Christian Andersen), The Gold Rush, The Jerk.

==== The Quest ====
The protagonist and companions set out to acquire an important object or to get to a location. They face temptations and other obstacles along the way.

Examples: The Iliad (Homer), The Pilgrim's Progress (John Bunyan), The Lord of the Rings (J.R.R. Tolkien), King Solomon's Mines (H. Rider Haggard), The Divine Comedy (Dante Alighieri), Watership Down (Richard Adams), The Aeneid (Virgil), Raiders of the Lost Ark

==== Voyage and Return ====
The protagonist goes to a strange land and, after overcoming the threats it poses or learning important lessons unique to that location, returns with experience.

Examples: Odyssey (Homer), Alice's Adventures in Wonderland (Lewis Carroll), "Goldilocks and the Three Bears", Orpheus, The Time Machine (H.G. Wells), Peter Rabbit (Beatrix Potter), The Hobbit (J.R.R. Tolkien), Brideshead Revisited (Evelyn Waugh), "The Rime of the Ancient Mariner" (Samuel Taylor Coleridge), Gone with the Wind (Margaret Mitchell), The Third Man, The Lion King, Back to the Future, The Lion, the Witch and the Wardrobe (C.S. Lewis), Gulliver's Travels (Jonathan Swift), Peter Pan (J. M. Barrie), The Epic of Gilgamesh, Ramayana.

==== Comedy ====
Light and humorous character with a happy or cheerful ending; a dramatic work in which the central motif is the triumph over adverse circumstance, resulting in a successful or happy conclusion. Booker stresses that comedy is more than humour. It refers to a pattern where the conflict becomes more and more confusing, but is at last made plain in a single clarifying event. The majority of romance films fall into this category.

Examples: The Wasps (Aristophanes), Aulularia (Titus Maccius Plautus), The Arbitration (Menander), A Midsummer Night's Dream (William Shakespeare), Much Ado About Nothing (William Shakespeare), Twelfth Night (William Shakespeare), The Taming of the Shrew (William Shakespeare), The Alchemist (Ben Jonson), Bridget Jones's Diary (Helen Fielding), Four Weddings and a Funeral, The Big Lebowski.

==== Tragedy ====
The protagonist is a hero with a major character flaw or great mistake which is ultimately their undoing. The protagonist's unfortunate end evokes pity at their folly and the fall of a fundamentally good character.

Examples: Bonnie and Clyde, Carmen (Prosper Mérimée), Citizen Kane, John Dillinger, Jules et Jim, Julius Caesar (William Shakespeare), Macbeth (William Shakespeare), Madame Bovary (Gustave Flaubert), Oedipus Rex (Sophocles), The Picture of Dorian Gray (Oscar Wilde), Romeo and Juliet (William Shakespeare), Hamilton, The Great Gatsby (F. Scott Fitzgerald), Hamlet (William Shakespeare).

==== Rebirth ====
An event forces the protagonist to change their ways and often become a better person.

Examples: "The Frog Prince", "Beauty and the Beast", "The Snow Queen" (Hans Christian Andersen), A Christmas Carol (Charles Dickens), The Secret Garden (Frances Hodgson Burnett), Peer Gynt (Henrik Ibsen), The Good Place, Groundhog Day, Iron Man.

=== The Rule of Three ===
The third event in a series of events becomes "the final trigger for something important to happen." This pattern appears in childhood stories such as "Goldilocks and the Three Bears", "Cinderella", and "Little Red Riding Hood".

In adult stories, the Rule of Three conveys the gradual resolution of a process that leads to transformation. This transformation can be downwards as well as upwards.

Booker asserts that the Rule of Three is expressed in four ways:

1. The simple, or cumulative three, for example, in the original version, Cinderella's three visits to the ball.
2. The ascending three, where each event is of more significance than the preceding, for example, the hero must win first bronze, then silver, then gold objects.
3. The contrasting three, where only the third has positive value, for example, The Three Little Pigs, two of whose houses are blown down by the Big Bad Wolf.
4. The final or dialectical form of three, where, as with Goldilocks and her bowls of porridge, the first is wrong in one way, the second in an opposite way, and the third is "just right".

== Precursors ==
- William Foster-Harris's The Basic Patterns of Plot sets out a theory of three basic patterns of plot.
- Ronald B. Tobias set out a twenty-plot theory in his 20 Master Plots.
- Georges Polti's The Thirty-Six Dramatic Situations.
- Several of these plots are similar to Joseph Campbell's work on the quest and return in The Hero with a Thousand Faces (see Hero's journey).

== Reception ==
The Seven Basic Plots has received mixed responses from scholars and journalists.

Some have celebrated the book's audacity and breadth; for example, the author and essayist Fay Weldon wrote the following: "This is the most extraordinary, exhilarating book. It always seemed to me that 'the story' was God's way of giving meaning to crude creation. Booker now interprets the mind of God and analyzes not just the novel – which will never to me be quite the same again – but puts the narrative of contemporary human affairs into a new perspective. If it took its author a lifetime to write, one can only feel gratitude that he did it." Beryl Bainbridge, Richard Adams, Ronald Harwood, and John Bayley also spoke positively of the work, while philosopher Roger Scruton described it as a "brilliant summary of story-telling".

Others have dismissed the book on grounds that Booker is too rigid in fitting works of art to the plot types above. For example, novelist and literary critic Adam Mars-Jones wrote, "[Booker] sets up criteria for art, and ends up condemning Rigoletto, The Cherry Orchard, Wagner, Proust, Joyce, Kafka and Lawrence—the list goes on—while praising Crocodile Dundee, E.T. and Terminator 2". Similarly, Michiko Kakutani in The New York Times writes, "Mr. Booker evaluates works of art on the basis of how closely they adhere to the archetypes he has so laboriously described; the ones that deviate from those classic patterns are dismissed as flawed or perverse – symptoms of what has gone wrong with modern art and the modern world."

== See also ==
- Analytical psychology
- Heroine's journey
- Monomyth
- Plot (narrative)
