= Superfolks =

Book by Robert Mayer

- First edition
- Author: Robert Mayer
- Genre: Superhero fiction
- Publisher: Dial Press
- Publication date: 1977
- ISBN: 0-207-95814-9
- OCLC: 2646306

Superfolks (also Super-Folks in its original cover art) is a 1977 novel by Robert Mayer. The novel satirizes the superhero and comic book genres, and was aimed at a more adult audience than those genres typically attracted.

Superfolks also examines comic book conventions and clichés from a more serious, "literary" perspective. The novel was influential on many writers of superhero comic books in the 1980s and 1990s, notably Kurt Busiek and Grant Morrison, the latter of whom brought the novel back to prominence in 1990 when he suggested that it had been a major influence on Alan Moore's Watchmen, Marvelman, and Superman: Whatever Happened to the Man of Tomorrow?, a claim Moore has generally downplayed.

== Publication history ==
A modest success upon publication (also featured as a special book club edition), Superfolks eventually fell out of print. It was republished in 2003 in limited quantities by About Comics with a new cover by Watchmen artist Dave Gibbons and an introduction by Busiek. It was reprinted again in March 2005 by St. Martin's Griffin with a new cover by Mike Allred and an introduction by Grant Morrison (ISBN 0-312-33992-5).

== Plot synopsis ==
The novel's protagonist is a Superman analogue named David Brinkley (a tuckerization of TV newsman David Brinkley). His superhero codename is never fully given: various intelligence agencies refer to him as "Indigo" (the color of his mask) and "der Übermensch" (Overman) and the original book jacket refers to him as "Everyman." He hails from the planet Cronk and is vulnerable to the substance Cronkite (a play on both TV newsman Walter Cronkite, and Superman's home Krypton and weakness to Kryptonite).

David gradually loses his superhuman powers due to the influence of an unknown enemy, and all of the other superheroes (including, strangely, Snoopy) retire, disappear, or die. It is later revealed that this is a plot made by the alien elf Pxyzsyzygy (Mr. Mxyzptlk by way of Howard Hughes) to kill all heroes.

David's powers gradually return, years later, in the midst of a mid-life crisis, and as criminals swarm Manhattan.

The loss of David's powers is discovered to be because his enemies—unsure of his secret identity—have introduced minute amounts of Cronkite into many common products, as well as the water supply. The return of his powers is later revealed to be a CIA-sponsored attempt to lure Brinkley out of retirement so that they can assassinate him as required by a nuclear disarmament treaty with the USSR.

With the assistance of the institutionalized Captain Mantra (Captain Marvel) and a grown-up, flamboyantly gay Peter Pan, David relearns how to use his powers and ultimately defeats his enemies: gigolo "Stretch" O'Toole, aka Elastic Man (Plastic Man); the incest-born Demoniac (reminiscent of Captain Marvel, Jr. and Black Adam); and the millionaire Powell Pugh, a.k.a. the alien elf Pxyzsyzygy (Mr. Mxyzptlk by way of Howard Hughes).

== Characters ==
- David Brinkley/Rodney, the main character. A Superman analog from Cronk, he is married and has two beautiful blonde children. By the end he has another child, a son, with his blue hair (and possibly some of his powers).
- Billy Button, aka Captain Mantra, is an ex-superhero who claims to be crazy. Like Captain Marvel he becomes a superhero after saying a magic word. In Button's case the word is "tomato-herring."
- Mary Button, aka Mary Mantra, is an analog for Mary Marvel died before the story begins after being run over by a train. She and her brother, Billy, had a child (Near the end of the book, she is revealed to be a head angel in heaven).
- Peter Pan is now older and homosexual, and gave Rodney some tips on flying.
- Demoniac, a villain who is the product of incest between Mary and Captain Mantra. He is a mix of Captain Marvel, Jr. and Black Adam.
- Elastic Man is an analog for Plastic Man, and serves as a villain for the series.
- Pxyzsyzygy is an analog for Mxyzptlk. He serves as the main villain for the story.

== Influence ==
Grant Morrison wrote an article in Speakeasy #111 and "[i]n the span of a few paragraphs, Morrison implies that Alan Moore stole the plots for 'Marvelman,' 'Watchmen,' and 'Superman: Whatever Happened to the Man of Tomorrow?' from Robert Mayer's relatively obscure novel." When asked about the influence of Superfolks, Moore said that he had read it at some point before writing Marvelman but that "it was by no means the only influence, or even a major influence upon me output. [sic]" suggesting "I’d still say that Harvey Kurtzman’s Superduperman probably had the preliminary influence, but I do remember Superfolks and finding some bits of it in that same sort of vein."

According to Kurt Busiek, "Superfolks was a revelation, over time changing my outlook on both superheroes and on writing, and making it possible for me to write Marvels, Astro City, Superman: Secret Identity and more."
