= Nicole L. Franklin =

American film director

Nicole L. Franklin is an American filmmaker, activist, writer and media professional. She founded Hack4Hope, a hackathon in St. Louis. Franklin writes for The Good Men Project, Toronto publication ByBlacks.com, and NBCBLK.

== Biography ==
Since 1999, her company EPIPHANY Inc. has been producing independent films for numerous cable networks including Showtime, BET, IFC, Nickelodeon, Sundance Channel, The Documentary Channel, FUBU TV, and now kweliTV. Her credits include The Double Dutch Divas!, Journeys In Black: the Jamie Foxx Biography, Kids Around the World, NBC Nightly News, The Today Show, Black Enterprise Business Report, and CBS News. Her current educational films include Gershwin & Bess: A Dialogue with Anne Brown and the 10-chapter series Little Brother, both titles distributed by Third World Newsreel. Little Brother airs on FUBU TV. Little Brother is a recipient of the Foundation to Promote Open Society/Campaign for Black Male Achievement Award, fiscally sponsored by Fractured Atlas.

== Awards ==
- Best Documentary, Atlanta's Night of the Black Independents
- Best Documentary, Hollywood Black Film Festival
- Best African-American Documentary, Brooklyn Film Festival
- CiNY Award for Outstanding Filmmaking, Cinewomen NY
- Gordon Parks Award Finalist for Directing a Feature
- Honorable Mention, Black Filmmakers Hall of Fame Filmworks
- Audience Award, African-American Women in Cinema Conference and Festival
- First Runner Up, First Annual Original Action Shero Film Festival Brooklyn, NY
- Inspirational Documentary Award, Riverrun Film Festival Asheville, NC
- Honorable Mention, Women of Color Film Festival New York, NY
- Community Service Award, African American Leadership Initiative (AALI) of the United Way of Greater Union County
- Juror's Choice Certificate, The Brooklyn Chapter of the Links "Salute to Youth" 12th Annual Women of African Descent Film Festival
- Citation from Councilmember Jumaane D. Williams (Brooklyn, NY) for "outstanding citizen" who gives "exemplary service to their communities" (2012, 2013)
- Daytime Entertainment Emmy Award, Video Editor, CBS Sunday Morning The National Academy of Television Arts and Sciences (2012-2013)
- Daytime Entertainment Emmy Award, Video Editor, CBS Sunday Morning The National Academy of Television Arts and Sciences (2014-2015)
