= Arnold van Gennep =

German anthropologist (1873–1957)

Arnold van Gennep, full name Charles-Arnold Kurr van Gennep (23 April 1873 – 7 May 1957), was a Dutch-German-French ethnographer and folklorist.

== Biography ==
He was born in Ludwigsburg, in the Kingdom of Württemberg (since 1871, part of the German Empire). After his parents' separation, Van Gennep adopted his Dutch mother's name, van Gennep. When he was six, he and his mother moved to Lyon, France, where she married a French doctor, who moved the family to Savoy.

Van Gennep is best known for his work regarding rites of passage ceremonies and his significant works in modern French folklore. He is recognised as the founder of folklore studies in France.

He went to Paris to study at the Sorbonne. However, he was disappointed that the school did not offer the subjects he wanted, and so he enrolled at the École des langues orientales to study Arabic and at the École pratique des hautes études for philology, general linguistics, Egyptology, Ancient Arabic, primitive religions and Islamic culture. That scholarly independence would manifest itself for the remainder of his life. He never held an academic position in France.

From 1912 to 1915, he held the Chair of Ethnography at the University of Neuchâtel in Switzerland but was expelled for expressing doubts about the neutrality of Switzerland during World War I. There he reorganized the museum and organized the first ethnographic conference (1914). In 1922, he toured the United States.

His best-known work is Les rites de passage (The Rites of Passage, 1909), which includes his vision of rites of passage rituals as being divided into three phases: préliminaire or "preliminary", liminaire or "liminality" (a stage much studied by the anthropologist Victor Turner), and postliminaire or "post-liminality".

His major work in French folklore was Le Manuel de folklore français contemporain (Handbook of Contemporary French Folklore, 1937–1958).

He died in 1957 in Bourg-la-Reine, France.

== Influences ==
- The Rites of Passage was highly influential in the structuring of Joseph Campbell's 1949 text, The Hero with a Thousand Faces, as Campbell divides the journey of the hero into three parts, Departure, Initiation, and Return.
- The Rites of Passage influenced anthropologist Victor Turner's research, particularly his 1969 text, The Ritual Process: Structure and Anti-Structure.

== Works ==
- Le Tissage aux Cartons et son utilisation décorative dans l'Egypte Ancienne, Neuchatel, Switzerland: Delachaux & Niestlé, 1916, co-author Gustave Jeqier. English translation Cardweaving in Ancient Egypt Barbara Shapiro, transl. San Francisco, 2010.
- Traité comparatif des nationalités, Paris: Payot, 1922
- Tabou et Totemisme a Madagascar Etude Descriptive et Theorique, Paris: 1904
- Essai d’une théorie des langues spécialesl, Paris: 1908
- Works at archive.org
- The Rites of Passage, 1909. University of Chicago Press, 1960. web page
- Les Jeux et les Sports populaires de France: Arnold Van Gennep (textes inédits 1925), L.S. Fournier (éd.), Paris, éditions du Comité des travaux historiques et scientifiques, 2015.

En Algerie, 1914
