= The American Monomyth =

Book by John Shelton Lawrence

First edition (publ. Anchor Books)

The American Monomyth is a 1977 book by Robert Jewett and John Shelton Lawrence arguing for the existence and cultural importance of an 'American Monomyth', a variation on the classical monomyth as proposed by Joseph Campbell.

Campbell's monomyth describes a hero's journey: a hero ventures from the normal world into a supernatural one, winning a decisive victory there and returning with a 'boon'. In contrast, Jewett and Lawrence define the American monomyth as:

A community in a harmonious paradise is threatened by evil; normal institutions fail to contend with this threat; a selfless superhero emerges to renounce temptations and carry out the redemptive task; aided by fate, his decisive victory restores the community to its paradisiacal condition; the superhero then recedes into obscurity.

In their 2002 book The Myth of the American Superhero (with Lawrence as first author) and their 2003 book Captain America And The Crusade Against Evil: The Dilemma Of Zealous Nationalism (with Jewett as first author), the authors extend the thesis by using examples from both American popular culture and the American religious tradition.

The American Monomyth posits a level of cultural belief in American society that helps to explain the desire in American government to "save" the world.

== See also ==
- American exceptionalism
