= Heroine's journey =

Female-centric pattern in storytelling

In storytelling, the heroine's journey is a female-centric version of the traditional hero's journey template. One origin of the idea is Maureen Murdock's 1990- book The Heroine's Journey: Woman's Quest for Wholeness; Murdock is a Jungian psychotherapist and a student of Joseph Campbell. She developed the guide while working with her female patients. Murdock stated that the heroine's journey is the healing of the wounding of the feminine that exists deep within her and the culture. Murdock explains, "The feminine journey is about going down deep into soul, healing and reclaiming, while the masculine journey is up and out, to spirit."

== Maureen Murdock's version of the heroine's journey ==
Murdock's model describes the female experience of a psycho-spiritual journey. Murdock proposed a cycle of eight stages. Like the Hero's Journey, these stages are able to be removed and switched around as necessary. It begins with the breaking away from feminine ideals and the turning towards the patriarchal values. Then comes the experience of spiritual death, and turning inward to reclaim the power and spirit of the sacred feminine. The ending stages consist of union of both the masculine and feminine values.

=== Shift from feminine to masculine ===
The heroine begins to distance herself from anything deemed feminine. Often it can be portrayed as a mother figure or a traditionally female role in society. The mother will be a representation of everything the heroine hates about her femininity. The mother may also be perfect, causing the heroine to reject her femininity out of feelings of inferiority.

Winkle: "During stage one, the heroine rejects the feminine in favor of the masculine. She may still be tied to the feminine, but she increasingly resents that attachment."

=== Identification with the masculine ===
The heroine begins to identify with external masculine values. This can be portrayed as a father figure or a traditionally male role in society. The father will be a representation of freedom from the mother figure. The father would praise the heroine for her strength, but also ridicule her for her femininity. The heroine will leave her feminine values behind completely and embrace the masculine values instead.

Murdock: "This stage involves an Identification with the Masculine, but not one’s inner personal masculinity. Rather, it is the outer patriarchal masculine whose driving force is power. An individual in a patriarchal society is driven to seek control over themselves and others in an inhuman desire for perfection."

=== Road of trials ===
Similar to the Hero's Journey, the heroine faces obstacles that lead to character development. These tasks will be related to gaining success, achieving higher status, and empowerment. Contrary to the Hero's Journey, the heroine also struggles with inner conflict. These tasks will be related to conquering preconceived notions of dependency, love, and inferiority.

Winkle: "By stage three, the heroine has faced great trials and emerged victorious. She feels the thrill of success, and her confidence is bolstered by the applause of others. She has built an impressive, masculine reputation."

=== Experiencing the illusory boon of success ===
The heroine will overcome the obstacles that she faced. Upon experiencing success, the heroine will realize she has betrayed her own values in order to achieve the goal. The heroine will feel limited in her new life.

Murdock: "She has achieved everything she set out to do, but it has come at great sacrifice to her soul. Her relationship with her inner world is estranged. She feels oppressed but doesn’t understand the source of her victimization."

=== The descent/meeting with the goddess ===
Crisis falls upon the heroine and the masculine traits she has learned fail. The crisis can be death in the family, mental or physical disabilities, or loss of self identity. Here the heroine must reconcile with her feminine side. The heroine meets with a goddess figure, who represents all the positive values of femininity she has left behind. After this meeting, she is inspired to return to femininity.

=== Yearning for the reconnect ===
The heroine wants to reconnect with her feminine side and may try to rekindle a bond between herself and the mother. She may also try to go back to her previous style of living. However, the heroine will discover that she is not able to return to the old lifestyle she once lived. However, the heroine will see her old values and traits from a different perspective.

=== Reconciliation with the masculine ===
Another crisis falls upon the heroine and she must look inward and understand the masculine part of her identity. She will recognize that there are positives and negatives to her masculinity.

Murdock: "The next stage involves Healing the Unrelated or Wounded Aspects of her Masculine Nature as the heroine takes back her negative projections on the men in her life. This involves identifying the parts of herself that have ignored her health and feelings, refused to accept her limits, told her to tough it out, and never let her rest. It also involves becoming aware of the positive aspects of her masculine nature that supports her desire to bring her images into fruition, helps her to speak her truth and own her authority."

=== The union ===
In the final stage, the heroine fully accepts and understands both sides of her true nature. She will find balance between both sides and actively work towards keeping that balance.

Murdock: "The heroine must become a spiritual warrior. This demands that she learn the delicate art of balance and have the patience for the slow, subtle integration of the feminine and masculine aspects of her nature."

== Victoria Lynn Schmidt's version of the heroine's journey ==
Victoria Lynn Schmidt wrote two versions of a character's journey: The Feminine and the Masculine Journey. She published her version in 2001 in her book: 45 Master Characters. The most noticeable differences were the circular nature and that the female had to prove herself to herself. Schmidt's version is commonly used in writing as opposed to Murdock's version. Similar to the Hero's Journey, the stages can be interchanged and repeatable.

=== Eye of the storm ===
Similar to Boon of Success, the heroine triumphs for a short time. However, this victory serves as a false calm. This stage can be moved around throughout the journey.

"In the true Heroine’s Journey, the heroine may experience momentary but not sustained success because those around her do not want to be led by a woman/women for long, or the men around her begin to undermine her, or after the crisis passes she is left trying to fill multiple roles that are inconsistent or impossible for a single person to fulfill."

=== All is lost/death ===
The heroine realizes that her newly learned skills cannot help her and she cannot fall back on her old ways either. The situation around her gets worse and she has no choice but to accept defeat.

=== Rebirth/moment of truth ===
Due to the support she has gotten, the heroine finds courage and hope again. She fully understands her place in the world and how she will face her doubts.

=== Return to a new world ===
The heroine sees the world as it truly is. She understands herself better and this will change the way she lives her life from then on. This change is more spiritual and internally driven than external.

== Reception ==
At the time of publication (1990), Murdock's theory and template re-framed the commonly accepted Hero's Journey in a way that offered emotional and spiritual depth, attracting many readers and leading to eventual publication in seven languages. Joseph Campbell rejected the model personally in a conversation with Murdock, stating that it was an unnecessary expansion on his template. The Heroine's Journey introduced Murdock to the public eye and increased general interest in the distinction between male and female stories of personal growth, as shown through a sharp increase in attendance at her lectures. At one of her lectures, Murdock stated, "At Mythic Journeys the feminine journey was being discussed in the basement in a room too small, while the masculine journey was discussed upstairs in the hotel’s Grand Ballroom!" The Heroine's Journey popularity expanded as other authors created various versions since Murdock's publication.

== Criticisms ==
Murdock's book was written specifically for women and therapists, leading to criticisms that it was difficult to use as a template for creative writing. Murdock used her model to help her patients and has held many lectures to spread her teachings to others. Other versions such as Schmidt's allowed the Heroine's Journey to be more flexible and able to touch upon a number of different topics rather than just a spiritual journey.

Joseph Campbell reportedly said when shown Murdock's model: "Women don’t need to make the journey, they are the place that everyone is trying to get to." Campbell, who examined the primarily male Hero's journey, believed that as women were often the destination of a hero's journey, women did not need to go on the journey themselves. Murdock's model, to some extent, inherently accounts for this criticism due to the heroine starting out identifying more masculine and resolving the inner conflict by the last, "union" stage of the heroine's journey.

== Heroine's journey in pop culture/literature ==
- Buffy Summers in Buffy the Vampire Slayer
- Moana in Disney's Moana
- Chihiro Ogino in Spirited Away
- Katniss Everdeen in The Hunger Games
- Dorothy in The Wizard of Oz
- Rey in The Force Awakens/The Last Jedi
- Andrea Sachs in the film adaptation of The Devil Wears Prada
- Clarice Starling in The Silence of the Lambs
- Elora Danan in Willow (TV series)

== See also ==
- Dan Harmon's story circle
- Dramatic structure
- Hero's journey
- The Seven Basic Plots
