= Christopher Booker =

English journalist and author (1937–2019)

- Born: Christopher John Penrice Book; 7 October 1937
- Died: 3 July 2019 (aged 81)
- Education: Corpus Christi College, Cambridge
- Occupations: Journalist; author
- Known for: Co-founder of Private Eye
- Spouse(s): Emma Tennant (1963–68); Christine Verity (m. 1972); Valerie Patrick (m. 1979)

Christopher John Penrice Booker (7 October 1937 – 3 July 2019) was an English journalist and author. He was a founder and first editor of the satirical magazine Private Eye in 1961. From 1990 onwards, he was a columnist for The Sunday Telegraph. In 2009, he published The Real Global Warming Disaster. He also disputed the link between passive smoking and cancer, and the dangers posed by asbestos. In his Sunday Telegraph section, he frequently commented on the UK Family Courts and Social Services.

In collaboration with Richard North, Booker wrote a variety of publications advancing a Eurosceptic, though academically disputed, popular historiography of the European Union. The best-known of these is The Great Deception.

== Career ==
=== Early life ===
Booker was educated at Dragon School, Shrewsbury School and Corpus Christi College, Cambridge, where he studied history.

=== 1960s ===
With fellow Salopians Richard Ingrams and Willie Rushton, Booker founded Private Eye in 1961, and was its first editor. He was ousted by Ingrams in 1963. Returning in 1965, Booker remained a permanent member of the magazine's collaborative joke-writing team thereafter (with Ingrams, Barry Fantoni and current editor Ian Hislop) till his death.

Booker began writing jazz reviews for The Daily Telegraph while at university. From 1961 to 1964, he wrote about jazz for The Sunday Telegraph as well. His contributions included a positive account of a concert given by the pianist Erroll Garner, which did not happen; it was a late cancellation. In 1962, he became the resident political scriptwriter on the BBC satire show That Was The Week That Was, notably contributing sketches on Home Secretary Henry Brooke and Prime Minister Sir Alec Douglas-Home, which have often been cited as examples of the programme's outspoken style.

From 1964 he became a Spectator columnist, writing on the press and TV, and in 1969 published The Neophiliacs: A Study of the Revolution in English Life in the Fifties and Sixties, a highly critical analysis of the role played by fantasy in the political and social life of those decades. He was married to the novelist Emma Tennant between 1963 and 1968.

=== 1970s ===
He married Christine Verity, his second wife, in 1972. In the early 1970s, Booker campaigned against both the building of tower blocks and the wholesale redevelopment of Britain's cities according to the ideology of the modernist movement. In 1973, he published Goodbye London (written with Candida Lycett Green), and, with Bennie Gray, was the IPC Campaigning Journalist of the Year. He made a documentary for the BBC in 1979 on modernist architecture, called City of Towers. In the mid-1970s he contributed a regular quiz to Melvyn Bragg's BBC literary programme Read All About It, and he returned to The Spectator as a weekly contributor (1976–1981), when he also became a lead book-reviewer for The Sunday Telegraph. In 1979, he married Valerie Patrick, his third wife, with whom he had two sons; they lived in Somerset.

=== 1980s ===
In 1980, he published The Seventies: Portrait Of A Decade, and covered the Moscow Olympics for the Daily Mail, publishing The Games War: A Moscow Journal the following year. Between 1987 and 1990 he wrote The Daily Telegraph's The Way of the World column (a satirical column originated by Michael Wharton) as "Peter Simple II", and in 1990 swapped places with Auberon Waugh, after mocking Waugh who firmly requested he should write the column instead of Booker, to become a weekly columnist on The Sunday Telegraph, where he remained until March 2019.

Between 1986 and 1990 he took part in a detailed investigation, chaired by Brigadier Tony Cowgill, of the charges that senior British politicians, including Harold Macmillan, had been guilty of a serious war crime in handing over thousands of Cossack and Yugoslav prisoners to the Communists at the end of the war in 1945. Their report, published in 1990, presented those events in a very different light, and Booker later published a lengthy analysis of the controversy in A Looking Glass Tragedy (1997).

=== After 1990 ===
From 1992 he focused more on the role played in British life by bureaucratic regulation and the European Union, forming a professional collaboration with Richard North, and they subsequently co-authored a series of books, including The Mad Officials: How The Bureaucrats Are Strangling Britain (1994); The Castle of Lies (1996); The Great Deception (2003), a critical history of the European Union; and Scared To Death: From BSE To Global Warming, Why Scares Are Costing Us The Earth (2007), a study of the part played in Western society in recent decades by the 'scare phenomenon'.

In 2004, he published The Seven Basic Plots: Why We Tell Stories, a Jungian-influenced analysis of stories and their psychological meaning, on which he had been working for over 30 years. The book was dismissed by Adam Mars-Jones, who objected to Booker employing his generalisations about conventional plot structures prescriptively: "He sets up criteria for art, and ends up condemning Rigoletto, The Cherry Orchard, Wagner, Proust, Joyce, Kafka and Lawrence – the list goes on – while praising Crocodile Dundee, ET and Terminator 2".

Fay Weldon wrote: "This is the most extraordinary, exhilarating book. It always seemed to me that 'the story' was God's way of giving meaning to crude creation. Booker now interprets the mind of God, and analyses not just the novel – which will never to me be quite the same again – but puts the narrative of contemporary human affairs into a new perspective. If it took its author a lifetime to write, one can only feel gratitude that he did it". Roger Scruton described it as a "brilliant summary of story-telling".

== Views ==
Booker's weekly columns in The Sunday Telegraph covered a wide range of topics of public interest. He has been described by British columnist James Delingpole in The Spectator as doing "the kind of proper, old-school things that journalists hardly ever bother with in this new age of aggregation and flip bloggery: he digs, he makes the calls, he reads the small print, he takes up the cause of the little man and campaigns, he speaks truth to power without fear or favour".

On a range of health issues, Booker put forward a view that the public is being unnecessarily "scared", as detailed in his book Scared to Death. Thus, he argues that asbestos, passive smoking and BSE have not been shown to be dangerous. His articles on global warming have been challenged by George Monbiot of The Guardian.

Booker said that white asbestos is "chemically identical to talcum powder" and poses a "non-existent" risk to human health, relying primarily on a 2000 paper for the Health and Safety Executive (HSE). He wrote in January 2002 that "HSE studies, including a paper by John Hodgson and Andrew Darnton in 2000, concluded that the risk from the substance is "virtually zero". In response, the HSE's director general, Timothy Walker, wrote that Booker's articles on asbestos had been "misinformed and do little to increase public understanding of a very important occupational health issue." The HSE issued further rebuttals to articles written by Booker in both 2005 and in 2006.

In an article in May 2008, Booker again cited the Hodgson and Darnton paper, claiming that "they concluded that the risk of contracting mesothelioma from white asbestos cement was "insignificant", while that of lung cancer was "zero". This article was also criticised by the HSE as "substantially misleading", as well as by George Monbiot, who argued that Booker misrepresented the authors' findings. Booker's claims were also critically analysed by Richard Wilson in his book Don't Get Fooled Again (2008). Wilson highlighted Booker's repeated endorsement of the alleged scientific expertise of John Bridle, who in 2004 was convicted under the UK's Trade Descriptions Act of making false claims about his qualifications.

=== Global warming ===
Booker said that the Climate Change Act 2008 was "the most expensive piece of legislation ever put through Parliament", and likely to cost hundreds of billions over the next 40 years. In May 2009, Booker spoke at an International Conference on Climate Change organised by The Heartland Institute. In the autumn of 2009, he published The Real Global Warming Disaster. The book, which became his best-selling work, claims that there is not actually a consensus on climate change, and postulates that the measures taken by governments to combat climate change "will turn out to be one of the most expensive, destructive, and foolish mistakes the human race has ever made". The book was characterised by Philip Ball in The Observer as being as "the definitive climate sceptics' manual", in which "he has rounded up just about every criticism ever made of the majority scientific view that global warming, most probably caused by human activity, is under way, and presented them unchallenged".

Ball said that Booker's position required the reader to believe that "1) Most of the world's climate scientists, for reasons unspecified, decided to create a myth about human-induced global warming and have managed to twist endless measurements and computer models to fit their case, without the rest of the scientific community noticing. George W Bush and certain oil companies have, however, seen through the deception. 2) Most of the world's climate scientists are incompetent and have grossly misinterpreted their data and models, yet their faulty conclusions are not, as you might imagine, a random chaos of assertions, but all point in the same direction."

In December 2009, Christopher Booker and Richard North had published an article in The Sunday Telegraph in which they questioned whether Rajendra Pachauri, chair of the Intergovernmental Panel on Climate Change (IPCC), was using his position for personal gain, with a follow-up Telegraph article in January 2010. On 21 August 2010, The Daily Telegraph issued an apology, and withdrew the December article from their website, having reportedly paid legal fees running into six figures. Pachauri described the statements against him as "another attempt by the climate sceptics to discredit the IPCC."

=== Family courts ===
Booker wrote a number of articles raising concerns about the Family Court system in England and Wales. Booker championed the cause of Victoria Haigh, bringing him into further conflict with the judiciary. Booker also championed the cause of Marie Black, who fled the UK with her partner and daughter in order to evade social services.

== Death ==
Booker died on 3 July 2019. On 12 July, he was featured in the BBC Radio 4 obituary programme Last Word.

== Bibliography ==
- The Neophiliacs: A Study of the Revolution in English Life in the Fifties and Sixties (1969).
- Goodbye London (with Candida Lycett Green) (1979).
- The Seventies: Portrait Of A Decade (1980).
- The Games War: A Moscow Journal (1981).
- The Mad Officials: How The Bureaucrats Are Strangling Britain (with Richard North, 1994).
- The Castle of Lies: Why Britain Must get Out of Europe (with Richard North, 1996).ISBN 0715626930
- A Looking-Glass Tragedy. The Controversy Over The Repatriations From Austria in 1945, London, United Kingdom, Gerald Duckworth & Co Ltd, First Edition (1997).
- The Great Deception (with Richard North, 2003), London: Continuum Publishing.
- The Seven Basic Plots: Why We Tell Stories (2004).
- Scared To Death: From BSE To Global Warming, Why Scares Are Costing Us The Earth (with Richard North, 2007), London: Continuum. ISBN 0-8264-8614-2.
- Climategate to Cancun: The Real Global Warming Disaster Continues... (with Richard North, 2010), London: Continuum.
- Booker, Christopher (2009). The Real Global Warming Disaster. Continuum International Publishing Group Ltd. ISBN 978-1-4411-1052-7.
- Groupthink: A Study in Self Delusion ( 2020), London: Bloomsbury. ISBN 1472959051.

Media offices
New title	Editor of Private Eye; 1961–1963	Succeeded by Richard Ingrams
