= The Thirty-Six Dramatic Situations =

Book by Georges Polti

The Thirty-Six Dramatic Situations is a descriptive list which was first proposed by Georges Polti in 1895 to categorize every dramatic situation that might occur in a story or performance. Polti analyzed classical Greek texts, plus classical and contemporaneous French works. He also analyzed a handful of non-French authors. In his introduction, Polti claims to be continuing the work of Carlo Gozzi (1720–1806), who also identified 36 situations.

== Publication history ==
"Gozzi maintained that there can be but thirty-six tragic situations. Schiller took great pains to find more, but he was unable to find even so many as Gozzi."

—Goethe

This list was published in a book of the same name, which contains extended explanations and examples. The original French-language book was written in 1895. An English translation was published in 1916 and continues to be reprinted.

The list was popularized as an aid for writers, but is also used by dramatists, storytellers and others. Other similar lists have since been made.

It influenced Christina Stead and George Pierce Baker, the author of Dramatic Technique. The 36 situations have been critiqued as being "concatenations of events rather than minimal or isolable motifs".

== The 36 situations ==
Each situation is stated, then followed by the necessary elements for each situation and a brief description.

1. Supplication
  - a persecutor; a suppliant; a power in authority, whose decision is doubtful.
  - The suppliant appeals to the power in authority for deliverance from the persecutor. The power in authority may be a distinct person or be merely an attribute of the persecutor, e.g. a weapon suspended in their hand. The suppliant may also be two persons, the Persecuted and the Intercessor, an example of which is Esther interceding to the king on behalf of the Jews for deliverance from the king's chief advisor.
2. Deliverance
  - an unfortunate; a threatener; a rescuer
  - The unfortunate has caused a conflict, and the threatener is to carry out justice, but the rescuer saves the unfortunate. Examples: Ifigenia in Tauride, Deliverance; Superman (1941 film)
3. Crime pursued by vengeance
  - a criminal; an avenger
  - The criminal commits a crime that will not see justice, so the avenger seeks justice by punishing the criminal. Example: The Count of Monte Cristo
4. Vengeance taken for kin upon kin
  - Guilty Kinsman; an Avenging Kinsman; remembrance of the Victim, a relative of both.
  - Two entities, the Guilty and the Avenging Kinsmen, are put into conflict over wrongdoing to the Victim, who is allied to both. Example: Hamlet
5. Pursuit
  - punishment; a fugitive
  - the fugitive flees punishment for a misunderstood conflict. Example: Les Misérables, The Fugitive
6. Disaster
  - a vanquished power; a victorious enemy or a messenger
  - The vanquished power falls from their place after being defeated by the victorious enemy or being informed of such a defeat by the messenger. Example: Agamemnon (play)
7. Falling prey to cruelty/misfortune
  - an unfortunate; a master or a misfortune
  - The unfortunate suffers from misfortune and/or at the hands of the master. Example: Job (biblical figure)
8. Revolt
  - a tyrant; a conspirator
  - The tyrant, a cruel power, is plotted against by the conspirator. Example: Julius Caesar (play)
9. Daring enterprise
  - a bold leader; an object; an adversary
  - The bold leader takes the object from the adversary by overpowering the adversary. Example: Queste del Saint Graal; The Lord of the Rings; Raiders of the Lost Ark
10. Abduction
  - an abductor; the abducted; a guardian
  - The abductor takes the abducted from the guardian. Example: Helen of Troy
11. The enigma
  - a problem; an interrogator; a seeker
  - The interrogator poses a problem to the seeker and gives a seeker better ability to reach the seeker's goals. Example: Oedipus and the Sphinx
12. Obtaining
  - (a Solicitor & an adversary who is refusing) or (an arbitrator & opposing parties)
  - The solicitor is at odds with the adversary who refuses to give the solicitor an object in the possession of the adversary, or an arbitrator decides who gets the object desired by opposing parties (the solicitor and the adversary). Example: Apple of Discord
13. Enmity of kin
  - a Malevolent Kinsman; a Hated or a reciprocally-hating Kinsman
  - The Malevolent Kinsman and the Hated or a second Malevolent Kinsman conspire together. Example: As You Like It
14. Rivalry of kin
  - the Preferred Kinsman; the Rejected Kinsman; the Object of Rivalry
  - The Object of Rivalry chooses the Preferred Kinsman over the Rejected Kinsman. Example: Wuthering Heights
15. Murderous adultery
  - two Adulterers; a Betrayed Spouse
  - Two Adulterers conspire to kill the Betrayed Spouse. Example: Clytemnestra, Aegisthus, Double Indemnity
16. Madness
  - a Madman; a Victim
  - The Madman goes insane and wrongs the Victim. Example: The Shining (novel)
17. Fatal imprudence
  - the Imprudent; a Victim or an Object Lost
  - The Imprudent, by neglect or ignorance, loses the Object Lost or wrongs the Victim. Example: Kris Kelvin and his wife in Solaris (1972 film)
18. Involuntary crimes of love
  - a Lover; a Beloved; a Revealer
  - The Lover and the Beloved have unknowingly broken a taboo through their romantic relationship, and the Revealer reveals this to them. Example: Oedipus, Jocasta and the messenger from Corinth.
19. Slaying of kin unrecognized
  - the Slayer; an Unrecognized Victim
  - The Slayer kills the Unrecognized Victim. Example: Oedipus and Laius
20. Self-sacrifice for an ideal
  - a Hero; an Ideal; a Creditor or a Person/Thing sacrificed
  - The Hero sacrifices the Person or Thing for their Ideal, which is then taken by the Creditor.
21. Self-sacrifice for kin
  - a Hero; a Kinsman; a Creditor or a Person/Thing sacrificed
  - The Hero sacrifices a Person or Thing for their Kinsman, which is then taken by the Creditor.
22. All sacrificed for passion
  - a Lover; an Object of fatal Passion; the Person/Thing sacrificed
  - A Lover sacrifices a Person or Thing for the Object of their Passion, which is then lost forever. Example: Breaking Bad (2008 television show)
23. Necessity of sacrificing loved ones
  - a Hero; a Beloved Victim; the Necessity for the Sacrifice
  - The Hero wrongs the Beloved Victim because of the Necessity for their Sacrifice. Example: Binding of Isaac
24. Rivalry of superior vs. inferior
  - a Superior Rival; an Inferior Rival; the Object of Rivalry
  - An Inferior Rival bests a Superior Rival and wins the Object of Rivalry. Example: Godzilla vs. Kong
25. Adultery
  - two Adulterers; a Deceived Spouse
  - Two Adulterers conspire against the Deceived Spouse. Brothers (2009 film)
26. Crimes of love
  - a Lover; the Beloved
  - A Lover and the Beloved break a taboo by initiating a romantic relationship Example: Sigmund and his sister in The Valkyrie
27. Discovery of the dishonour of a loved one
  - a Discoverer; the Guilty One
  - The Discoverer discovers the wrongdoing committed by the Guilty One.
28. Obstacles to love
  - two Lovers; an Obstacle
  - Two Lovers face an Obstacle together. Example: Romeo and Juliet
29. An enemy loved
  - a Lover; the Beloved Enemy; the Hater
  - The allied Lover and Hater have diametrically opposed attitudes towards the Beloved Enemy.
30. Ambition
  - an Ambitious Person; a Thing Coveted; an Adversary
  - The Ambitious Person seeks the Thing Coveted and is opposed by the Adversary. Example: Macbeth
31. Conflict with a god
  - a Mortal; an Immortal
  - The Mortal and the Immortal enter a conflict.
32. Mistaken jealousy
  - a Jealous One; an Object of whose Possession He is Jealous; a Supposed Accomplice; a Cause or an Author of the Mistake
  - The Jealous One falls victim to the Cause or the Author of the Mistake and becomes jealous of the Object and becomes conflicted with the Supposed Accomplice.
33. Erroneous judgment
  - a Mistaken One; a Victim of the Mistake; a Cause or Author of the Mistake; the Guilty One
  - The Mistaken One falls victim to the Cause or the Author of the Mistake and passes judgment against the Victim of the Mistake when it should be passed against the Guilty One instead.
34. Remorse
  - a Culprit; a Victim or the Sin; an Interrogator
  - The Culprit wrongs the Victim or commits the Sin, and is at odds with the Interrogator who seeks to understand the situation. Example: The Bourne Supremacy, Memento
35. Recovery of a lost one
  - a Seeker; the One Found
  - The Seeker finds the One Found. Example: A Very Long Engagement, Finding Nemo
36. Loss of loved ones
  - a Kinsman Slain; a Kinsman Spectator; an Executioner
  - The killing of the Kinsman Slain by the Executioner is witnessed by the Kinsman. Example: Braveheart, Gladiator (2000 film)

== See also ==
- Aarne–Thompson classification systems
- Morphology (folkloristics)
- The Golden Bough
- The Seven Basic Plots
- TV Tropes
- Vladimir Propp
