= John Shelton Lawrence =

American professor & writer

- Born: Amarillo, TX United States
- Died: January 2, 2025; Berkeley, CA
- Occupations: Professor, writer

John Shelton Lawrence is an emeritus professor of philosophy at Morningside College in Sioux City, Iowa, United States. In 1999 he retired to Berkeley, CA, and died January 2, 2025. His initial major publication, The American Monomyth, written with Robert Jewett, was published in 1977.

== Career ==
The major contribution of The American Monomyth is a re-thinking of Joseph Campbell's famous classical monomyth from his 1949 book The Hero With a Thousand Faces. Campbell's monomyth described a universal narrative of the myth of the hero's journey which he claimed had disappeared in contemporary culture. Lawrence and Jewett described an American evolution of this mythological structure that reflected a deep antipathy to democratic institutions through the violent actions of a hero who remains separate from the community. This pattern varies significantly from Campbell's, that emphasizes the hero's return to the community with some kind of significant aid ("the boon") and a willingness to accept public leadership as a member of that community. Responding to the Star Trek fan movement of the late 1960s and early 1970s, they predicted the rise of entertainment-based systems of religious belief – a reality that became even more evident with the Star Wars phenomenon.

Lawrence and Jewett have since further expanded these initial ideas in two more books: The Myth of the American Superhero (2002), which extends the analysis of the American Monomyth of American mass culture into areas such as videogames, and Captain America and the Crusade Against Evil: The Dilemma of Zealous Nationalism (2003), (with Jewett listed as first author) which traces the history of holy wars and uses the American Monomyth concept to understand the American reaction after the events of September 11, 2001. The three books work together to suggest a mythological analysis of American culture in ways that account for religion, political history, mass (or popular) culture and are well regarded both in the United States and in Europe where they are read as a means of understanding American foreign policy.

In collaborating with Matthew Wilhelm Kapell, Lawrence has explored the idea of the "mythic franchise," the core mythic story that is licensed for a myriad of commercial entertainment venues. In Matthew Kapell and William G. Doty's Jacking In to the Matrix Franchise: Cultural Reception and Interpretation (2005), he explores the kind of fascism that is symbolically conveyed by heroic figures such as Luke Skywalker of Star Wars (1977) and Neo in The Matrix series. Matthew Kapell and Lawrence's co-edited book, Finding the Force of the Star Wars Franchise: Fans, Merchandise, and Critics (2006), examines the myths, the stereotypes, sexualities, the toys, and the critical response to the two Star Wars trilogies. George Lucas credited that Star Wars was influenced by John Shelton Lawrence's saga.

Lawrence has provided essays and filmographies for the Film and History League's publications Hollywood's White House: The American Presidency in Film and History (2003); there he suggests that Hollywood has begun to represent the president as a physical superhero in such films as Independence Day (1996) and Air Force One (1997); in Hollywood's West: The American Frontier in Film Television and History (2005), he analyzes The Lone Ranger as a juvenile franchise that has affected adult culture; in Landscape of Hollywood Westerns: Ecocriticism in an American Film Genre (2006), he has traced the little recognized subgenre of the Ecowestern.

In collaboration with Morningside College professor Marty Knepper, Lawrence published The Book of Iowa Films in June 2014. The book is the only comprehensive history and discussion of over 400 Iowa movies from 1918 through 2013, including both Hollywood films and independent films.

He is also known for work on scholarly-related issues in copyright through his edited volume (w. Bernard Timberg) Fair Use and Free Inquiry (1980, 1989) and the ethics of computer media for academic use and has written The Electronic Scholar: A Guide to Academic Microcomputing, published in 1984, which suggests many of the ethical issues that would arise with the advent of the Internet.
