= The Myth of the American Superhero =

- Author: Robert Jewett; John Shelton Lawrence
- Language: English
- Genre: Nonfiction
- Publication date: 2002
- Publication place: United States
- Media type: Print
- ISBN: 9780802825735

The Myth of the American Superhero is a scholarly non-fiction book by Robert Jewett and John Shelton Lawrence.

It describes the idealized, fantasy violence so distinctive of American pop culture. The authors propose that the American heroic ideal, conveyed in formula stories of "the American monomyth," is explicitly anti-democratic and contagious. Crusading loners, attracted by guns, bombs, and the call to destroy evil, act out the premises of the myth with tragic consequences. This book argues that Oklahoma City bomber Timothy McVeigh and Unabomber Theodore Kaczynski adopted the mythic convictions ritually enacted by celebrity stars such as John Wayne, Clint Eastwood, and Steven Seagal.

The book, published in July 2002, explores the relationship between our entertainment of the past century, and our national commitment to the ideals of democracy. Stories about superheroes—from the vigilante ideal launched by The Virginian novel a hundred years to the latest Spider-Man films or Touched by an Angel TV episodes — express despair over the failings of self-managed government and the hope for redemption by powerful individuals who rise above the law and institutions. The Myth of the American Superhero discusses novels, films, television shows, videogames and the behavior of national leaders inspired by this myth.

== Awards ==
- John Cawelti Award of the American Culture Association, Best Book of 2002
- Mythopoeic Society Scholarship Award in Myth and Fantasy Studies, 2004
