= The Real Global Warming Disaster =

2009 book by Christopher Booker

- Cover of the book
- Author: Christopher Booker
- Language: English
- Subject: Climate change
- Genre: Non-fiction
- Publisher: Continuum
- Publication date: 17 October 2009
- Publication place: United Kingdom
- Media type: Print (Hardcover)
- Pages: 368 pages
- ISBN: 1-4411-1052-6

The Real Global Warming Disaster (Is the Obsession with 'Climate Change' Turning Out to Be the Most Costly Scientific Blunder in History?) is a 2009 book by English journalist and author Christopher Booker in which he asserts that global warming cannot be attributed to humans, and then alleges how the scientific opinion on climate change was formulated.

From a standpoint of environmental scepticism, Booker seeks to combine an analysis of the science of global warming with the consequences of political decisions to reduce CO_{2} emissions and claims that, as governments prepare to make radical changes in energy policies, the scientific evidence for global warming is becoming increasingly challenged. He asserts that global warming is not supported by a significant number of climate scientists, and criticises how the UN's Intergovernmental Panel on Climate Change (IPCC) presents evidence and data, in particular citing its reliance on potentially inaccurate global climate models to make temperature projections. Booker concludes, "it begins to look very possible that the nightmare vision of our planet being doomed" may be imaginary, and that, if so, "it will turn out to be one of the most expensive, destructive, and foolish mistakes the human race has ever made".

The book's claims were strongly criticised by science writer Philip Ball, but the book was praised by several columnists. The book opens with an erroneous quotation, which Booker subsequently acknowledged and promised to correct in future editions.

The book was Amazon UK's fourth bestselling environment book of the decade 2000–10.

== Synopsis ==
The book consists of three parts and an epilogue.

Booker sums up the book's contents in a long epilogue, which quotes Theseus in A Midsummer Night's Dream:

In the night, imagining some fear, How easy is a bush supposed a bear

Booker contends that in this quote Shakespeare is identifying that "when we are not presented with enough information for our minds to resolve something into certainty, they may be teased into exaggerating it into something quite different from what it really is". The first chapter of the book is the introduction, where Booker warns us of the risk posed by 'those measures being proposed by the world's politicians in the hope that they can avert' climate change. It talks about the ineffectiveness of wind turbines, and how they produce the same amount of energy per year as one coal-fired power station (3.9 gigawatts). In the prologue, Booker claims that many people, including the former U.S President Barack Obama, were 'seriously misinformed' about the evidence surrounding Global Warming and the effects it might have on the world. Part I of the book tells how Climate Change has risen to 'the top of the World's political agenda' so quickly, and the methods he thinks the Inter-Governmental Panel on Climate Change used to convince politicians that the issue was genuine, including James Hansen's famous hearing before the American Senate, where he allegedly turned the room temperature up in order the strengthen his point. Part II of the book is entitled 'Gore and the EU unite to Save the Planet'. It depicts how, panic-stricken, the world's politicians took action to encourage more renewable forms of energy, and the closure of the world's non-renewable power stations. Finally, Part III speaks of how the Global Warming 'consensus begins (began) to crumble.' It claims that the evidence behind Climate Change and its causes is coming under increased scrutiny, and that by no means is the science "settled".

== Reception ==
The book received a positive reception from non-scientists in the media: In The Spectator, Rodney Leach said it was one of the best of its type, remarking that Booker "narrates this story with the journalist's pace and eye for telling detail and the historian's forensic thoroughness which have made him a formidable opponent of humbug". Columnist James Delingpole, himself the author of a denialist book, described the book as "another of those classics which any even vaguely intelligent person who wants to know what's really going on needs to read". Writing in The Herald, Brian Morton was largely sympathetic to the position taken by Booker in the book, attributing global warming to natural causes. A positive review by Henry Kelly in The Irish Times, referring to the book as "meticulously researched, provocative and challenging", was criticised by Irish environmental campaigner and climatechange.ie website founder John Gibbons, who said that the decision by The Irish Times to allow Kelly to review The Real Global Warming Disaster was part of a recent trend of "the media giving too much coverage to 'anti-science' climate change deniers and failing to convey the gravity of the threat, making readers and viewers apathetic". In The Scotsman, writer and environmentalist Sir John Lister-Kaye chose The Real Global Warming Disaster as one of his books of the year, writing that "though barely credible in places" this was an "important, brave book making and explaining many valid points".

Scientist Philip Ball, on the other hand, wrote in his review in The Observer that the book was "the definitive climate sceptics’ manual" in that it makes an uncritical presentation of "just about every criticism ever made of the majority scientific view" on global warming. Though expressing "a queer kind of admiration for the skill and energy with which Booker has assembled his polemic", Ball called the claims made by the author "bunk". Ball also criticised Booker's tactic of introducing global warming deniers "with a little eulogy to their credentials, while their opponents receive only a perfunctory, if not disparaging, preamble".

== Houghton misquotation ==
The book opens with an incorrect quotation which wrongly attributes to John T. Houghton the words "Unless we announce disasters, no one will listen". The publishers apologised for this misquotation, confirmed that it would not be repeated, and agreed to place a corrigendum in any further copies of the book. In an article which appeared in The Sunday Telegraph on 20 February 2010, Booker wrote "we shall all in due course take steps to correct the record, as I shall do in the next edition of my book". Houghton felt that Booker continued to misstate his position regarding the role of disasters in policy making, and he referred the matter to the Press Complaints Commission (PCC Reference 101959), following whose involvement The Sunday Telegraph published on 15 August a letter of correction by Houghton stating his actual position, that adverse events shock people and thereby bring about change. An article supportive of Houghton appeared in the New Scientist magazine.

== Bibliography ==
- Booker, Christopher (2009). The Real Global Warming Disaster. Continuum International Publishing Group Ltd. ISBN 978-1-4411-1052-7.
