= KweliTV =

Black-focused global streaming platform

kweliTV, Inc.
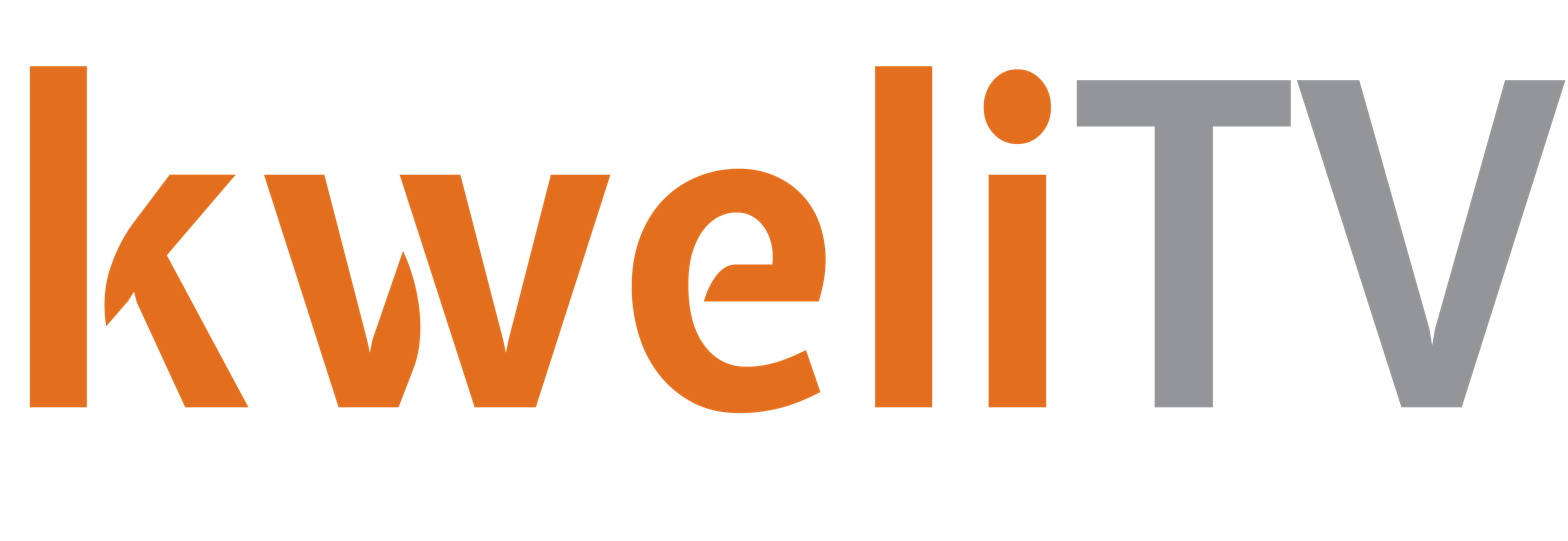
- Website type: Streaming network
- Country of origin: United States
- Founder: DeShuna Elisa Spencer
- Products: Streaming media; Video on demand; Live TV; Television on demand
- Services: Digital distribution; Production Company
- Website: kweli.tv

kweliTV, Inc. is a global streaming service and digital media company based in the Washington, DC metropolitan area focused on the global Black experience.

In 2023, kweliTV expanded its reach by being added to the digital collections of public and academic libraries, including the Birmingham Public Library's A–Z databases.

The company was incorporated in 2015 and officially launched out of beta in Fall 2017. A former journalist who has written for The Oakland Tribune, The Clarion Ledger and The Crisis Magazine among other publications, DeShuna Elisa Spencer started kweliTV because early in her career she noticed the connection between media images and implicit bias.

The company's name is derived from the Swahili term kweli, which means "truth". Spencer, who serves as the company's founder and CEO, started kweliTV after winning an initial US$20,000 grant from the now-defunct Unity Journalists. The platform officially launched out of beta after winning first place at the Harvard Africa Business New Venture Competition and receiving its first micro-investment from TEDCO in 2017. Notable supporters include Pharrell Williams’ Black Ambition and a16z’s Talent x Opportunity (TxO) accelerator.

kweliTV has been featured in CNN Business, Fast Company, Black Star Network, Refinery 29, TIME, Emmy Magazine, Shondaland, and more. kweliTV has been listed as one of the 10 best movie streaming services by PC Magazine since 2020.
