= Alice Meichi Li =

American visual artist and illustrator

- "Unicorn" from Elephantmen, winner of an Illustration West Silver Award
- Born: Alice Mei-Chi Li; August 13; Dearborn, Michigan, U.S.
- Education: School of Visual Arts
- Known for: Illustration, Comic Books, Painting
- Website: www.alicemeichi.li

Alice Meichi Li (李美姿) is a Chinese-American, New York City-based visual artist and illustrator for comic books, magazines, and album covers.

== Early life ==
Li was born to immigrants of Chinese descent, and was raised in Detroit, Michigan.

They went on to major in Cartooning at School of Visual Arts in New York City, later switching to Illustration. While at SVA, they became the only Illustration student in their year to receive the Alumni Scholarship Award.

== Bibliography ==
=== Covers ===
- Elephantmen #36 (2011, Back Cover) Image Comics
- Mega Man #21 (2013, Variant Cover) Archie Comics
- Rick and Morty: Lil' Poo-py Superstar #1 (2016, Variant Cover) Oni Press

=== Sequentials ===
- Reading With Pictures (2010, TPB, ISBN 978-0578052762) (Harvey Award-nominated)
- Secret Identities Volume 2: Shattered (2012, TPB, ISBN 978-1595588241) The New Press
- Reading With Pictures: Comics That Make Kids Smarter (2014, Hardcover, ISBN 978-1449458782) Andrews McMeel Publishing

=== Interior illustrations ===
- GirlsDrawinGirls Volume 4: The Way Nature Made Her (2011, Hardcover, ISBN 978-1450781701)
- Once Upon a Time Machine (2012, TPB, ISBN 978-1616550400) Dark Horse Comics (Harvey Award-nominated)
- Long Hidden: Speculative Fiction from the Margins of History (2014, Softcover, ISBN 978-0-9913921-0-0) Crossed Genres Publications
- Hana Doki Kira (2014, TPB) The Year 85 Group

=== Magazines ===
- CMYK Magazine (2009)
- YRB Magazine (2011)

== Exhibitions ==
=== Group ===
- Tripnotica NYC (2007) Galapagos Art Space, Brooklyn, NY
- NeoIntegrity: Comics Edition (2010) Museum of Comic and Cartoon Art, New York, NY
- Alt.Comics: Asian American Artists Reinvent the Comic Book (2012) Museum of Chinese in America, New York, NY

=== Juried ===
- Gamescape (2011) Artscape, Baltimore, MD

== Recognition ==
- The Scholastic Art & Writing Awards: 2002 (Two Silver Keys)
- Worldstudio AIGA: 2002 (W.K. Kellogg Foundation Award)
- American Illustration: 2007 (Chosen)
- Applied Arts Illustration Awards: 2009 (Editorial Category)
- Harvey Awards: 2011 (Nominated, Best Anthology & Best Original Graphic Publication for Younger Readers), 2013 (Nominated, Best Anthology)
- Society of Illustrators of Los Angeles: 2008, 2013 (Silver Award)
