= Bob Jewett =

American football player (1934–2015)

No. 86, 76, 80
- Position: End

Personal information
- Born: November 14, 1934; Mason, Michigan, U.S.
- Died: September 9, 2015 (aged 80); Charlotte, Michigan, U.S.
- Listed height: 6 ft 2 in (1.88 m)
- Listed weight: 198 lb (90 kg)

Career information
- High school: Mason
- College: Michigan State
- NFL draft: 1958: 5th round, 53rd overall pick

Career history
- Chicago Bears (1958); Toronto Argonauts (1961–1962); Grand Rapids Blazers (1962-1965)

Career NFL statistics
- Receptions: 15
- Receiving yards: 192
- Touchdowns: 1
- Stats at Pro Football Reference

Robert Gary Jewett (November 14, 1934 – September 9, 2015) was an American professional football player.

Jewett was born in 1934 in Mason, Michigan, and attended Mason High School.

He played college football for Michigan State University from 1944 to 1957.

He also played professional football in the National Football League (NFL) for the Chicago Bears in 1958. He appeared in 12 NFL games and caught 15 passes for 192 yards and one touchdown for the Bears. Jewett lived in Charlotte, Michigan, at the time of his death.

He also played in the Canadian Football League (CFL) for the Toronto Argonauts in 1961 and 1962. He concluded his professional football career in the United Football League (UFL), playing for the Grand Rapids Blazers from 1952 to 1965.

He was married in 1957 to Beverly Joan Young. He later operated a carpet and floor covering business. He also worked as a farmer, grave digger, and school teacher. He died in 2015 at Charlotte, Michigan.
