= The Writer's Journey: Mythic Structure for Writers =

2007 writing textbook by Christopher Vogler

The Writer's Journey
- Author: Christopher Vogler
- Language: English
- Genre: Non-fiction
- Publisher: Michael Wiese Productions
- Publication date: 2007
- Publication place: United States
- Media type: Paperback
- Pages: 407
- ISBN: 978-1-932907-36-0
- OCLC: 154677482
- Dewey Decimal: 808.2/3 22
- LC Class: PN1996 .V64 2007

The Writer's Journey: Mythic Structure For Writers is a popular writing textbook by writer Christopher Vogler, focusing on the theory that most stories can be boiled down to a series of narrative structures and character archetypes, described through mythological allegory.

The book was very well received upon its release, and is often featured in recommended reading lists for student screenwriters.

== History ==
The book stems from a seven-page studio memo, "A Practical Guide to The Hero with a Thousand Faces".

An earlier edition, The Writer's Journey: Mythic Structure for Storytellers and Screenwriters, was published in 1992. Vogler revised the book for the second release in 1998 and changed the title to The Writer's Journey: Mythic Structure for Writers. The third edition, published in 2007, included a new introduction, new artwork, and analysis of recent, popular motion pictures. In July 2020, the 25th Anniversary Edition was published, which includes new sections and topics.

== Summary of content ==
=== The archetypes ===
The first part of the book describes eight major character archetypes in detail. Those are:

1. Hero: someone who is willing to sacrifice his own needs on behalf of others
2. Mentor: all the characters who teach and protect heroes and give them gifts
3. Threshold Guardian: a menacing face to the hero, but if understood, they can be overcome
4. Herald: a force that brings a new challenge to the hero
5. Shapeshifter: characters who change constantly from the hero's point of view
6. Shadow: character who represents the energy of the dark side
7. Ally: someone who travels with the hero through the journey, serving variety of functions
8. Trickster: embodies the energies of mischief and desire for change

=== Stages of the Journey ===
The second part describes the twelve stages of the Hero's Journey. The stages are:

1. The Ordinary World: the hero is seen in their everyday life
2. The Call to Adventure: the initiating incident of the story
3. Refusal of the Call: the hero experiences some hesitation to answer the call
4. Meeting with the Mentor: the hero gains the supplies, knowledge, and confidence needed to commence the adventure
5. Crossing the First Threshold: the hero commits wholeheartedly to the adventure
6. Tests, Allies, and Enemies: the hero explores the special world, faces trial, and makes friends and enemies
7. Approach to the Innermost Cave: the hero nears the center of the story and the special world
8. The Ordeal: the hero faces the greatest challenge yet and experiences death and rebirth
9. Reward: the hero experiences the consequences of surviving death
10. The Road Back: the hero returns to the ordinary world or continues to an ultimate destination
11. The Resurrection: the hero experiences a final moment of death and rebirth so they are pure when they reenter the ordinary world
12. Return with the Elixir: the hero returns with something to improve the ordinary world

== See also ==
- Dan Harmon, eight-step Story Circle
- John Yorke, author of Into The Woods: A Five-Act Journey Into Story, another book about the parallels between myths and screenwriting
- Three-act structure
