= Development executive =

In film production, a development executive (often called DE for short) is a high-level position generally above a creative executive on the studio executive organizational chart. Their duties include reading scripts and finding source material which can be turned into motion picture content (feature films, television series, television films).
