= Drifter =

A drifter is a vagrant who moves from place to place without a fixed home or employment.

Drifter(s) or The Drifter(s) may also refer to:

== Films and television ==
=== Films ===
- The Drifter (1917 film), an American film directed by Fred Kelsey
- The Drifters (film), a 1919 American film starring J. Warren Kerrigan
- Drifters (1929 film), a British documentary by John Grierson
- The Drifter (1929 film), an American film starring Tom Mix
- The Drifter (1932 film), an American film directed by William A. O'Connor
- The Drifter (1944 film), an American Western Billy the Kid film directed by Sam Newfield
- The Drifter (1988 film), an American film starring Kim Delaney and Timothy Bottoms
- Drifters (2003 film), a Chinese film directed by Wang Xiaoshuai
- The Drifter (2010 film), a German film directed by Tatjana Turanskyj
- Drifters (2011 film), an Italian drama starring Asia Argento
- Drifters (2015 film), a Swedish film
- Drifter (2016 film), an American post-apocalyptic thriller
- Drifter (2026 film), an upcoming American sports action film

=== Television ===
- Drifters (TV series), a British television series
- Drifter, known as Dragga in the US, an orange high-technology car in the TV series Roary the Racing Car

== Literature ==
- Drifter, a 1974 novel by Daniel P. Mannix
- Drifter, a 1991 novel by William C. Dietz, the first installment in the Pik Lando trilogy
- "Drifters (poem)", 1968, by Bruce Dawe
- Drifters (manga), a 2009 Japanese manga by Kouta Hirano
- The Drifter, a 1965 novel by J. T. Edson, the fifth installment in the Waco series
- The Drifter, a 1969 novel by Will Cook
- The Drifter, a 1991 novel by Joyce Thies
- The Drifter, a 1994 novel by Richie Tankersley Cusick
- The Drifter, a 1995 novel by Vicki Lewis Thompson, the second installment in the Urban Cowboys series
- The Drifter, a 1998 novel by Susan Wiggs
- The Drifter, a 2000 novel by William W. Johnstone
- The Drifter, a 2004 novel by Lori Copeland, the second installment in the Men of the Saddle series
- The Drifter, a 2010 novel by Kate Hoffmann, the second installment in the Smooth Operators series
- The Drifters (novel), 1971, by James A. Michener

== Maritime ==
- Drifter (fishing boat), a type of herring boat
- Naval drifter, a naval boat similar to the fishing boats
- Drifter (oceanography), a device used to measure ocean currents and other metrics

== Music ==
=== Bands ===
- Drifter, an alternate name of Dutch electronic music trio Noisia
- Drifters (Swedish band), a Swedish dans-band
- The Drifters, an American doo wop/R&B vocal group
- The Drifters (Japanese band), a rock band and comedy act
- The Shadows, a British group originally known as the Drifters
- The Drifters, an Irish band fronted by Joe Dolan

=== Albums ===
- Drifters/Love Is the Devil, a 2013 album by Dirty Beaches
- The Drifter (album), 1966, by Marty Robbins
- Drifter (album), 1981, by Sylvia
- Drifter, a 2010 album by Lynn Verlayne
- The Drifter E.P., a 2008 EP by Lindi Ortega

=== Songs ===
- "Drifter" (song), 1981, by Sylvia, track song from the similarly titled album
- "Drifter", by Amy Lee featuring Dave Edgar from Lee's album Aftermath
- "Drifter", by Brookes Brothers from the single "Tear You Down"
- "Drifter", by David Gates from his album Goodbye Girl
- "Drifter", by Deep Purple from their album Come Taste the Band
- "Drifter", by Falling In Reverse from their album Fashionably Late
- "Drifter", by In Flames from their album Reroute to Remain
- "Drifter", by Iron Maiden from their album Killers
- "Drifter", by Karmin from their album Pulses
- "Drifter", by Wolves at the Gate from their album Eclipse
- "Drifters", by Patrick Watson from their album Close to Paradise
- "The Drifter", by Gene Clark and Carla Olson from their album So Rebellious a Lover
- "The Drifter", by Little River Band from their album After Hours

== Other uses ==
- The Drifter, an animated web series produced by Stan Lee Media
- Kawasaki Vulcan 800 Drifter or Kawasaki Vulcan 1500 Drifter, motorcycles manufactured from 1999 to 2006
- Drifter (chocolate), a Nestlé chocolate bar in the UK
- Drifter (drill), a rock or ground drill
- Someone engaged in the motorsport drifting
- Lockwood Drifter, an ultralight aircraft
- Drifter is a minor character in the video game Destiny 2 who hosts the Gambit activity
- The Drifter (video game), an adventure game

== See also ==
- Drift (disambiguation)
