= Myth =

Type of traditional narrative

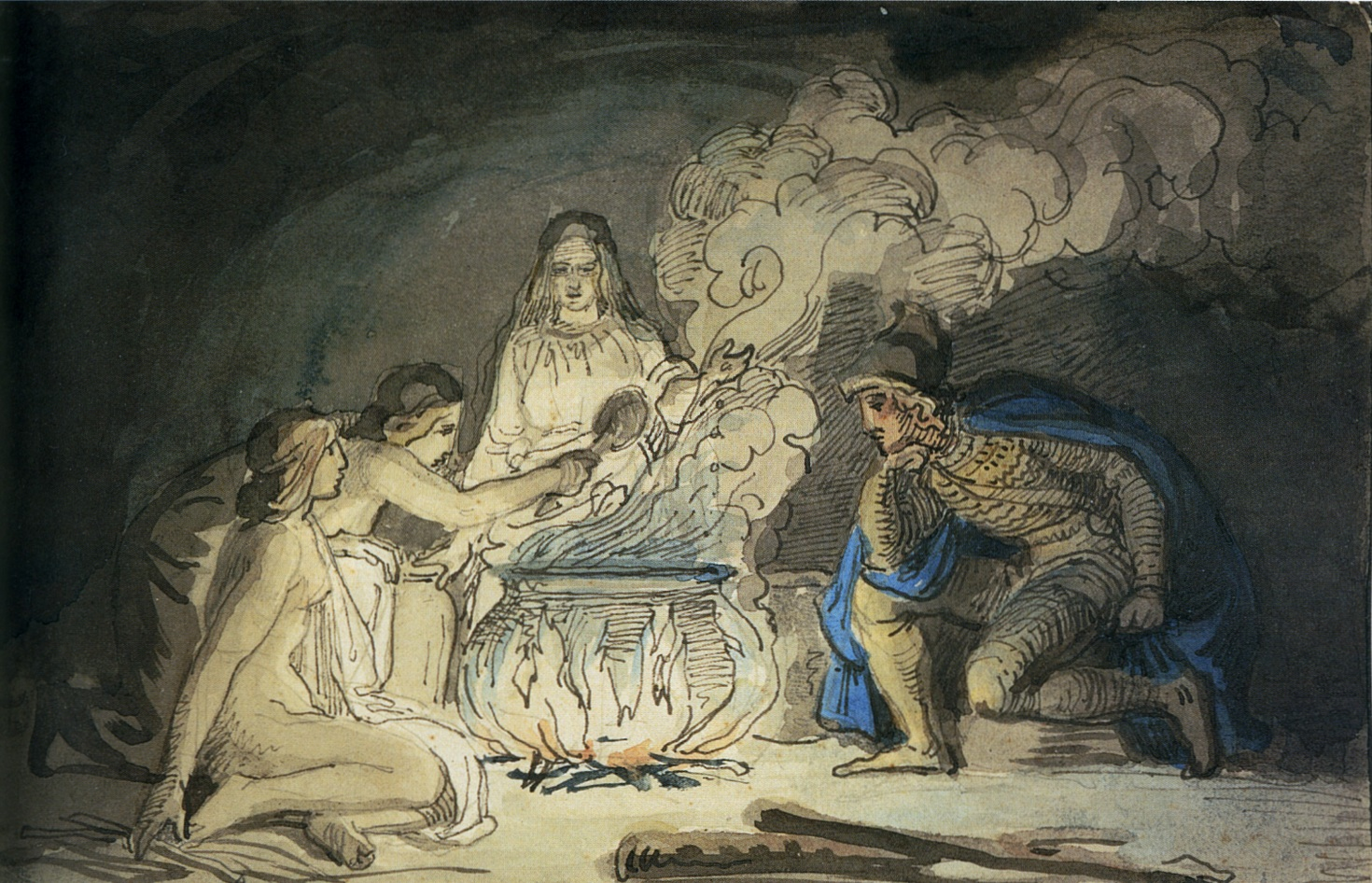
Ballads of bravery (1877) part of Arthurian mythology

Myth is a genre of folklore consisting primarily of narratives that play a fundamental role in a society. For scholars, this is different from the ordinary sense of the term myth, meaning a belief that is not true, as the veracity of a piece of folklore is entirely irrelevant to determining whether it constitutes a myth.

Myths are often endorsed by religious and secular authorities, and may be natural or supernatural in character. Many societies group their myths, legends, and history together, considering myths and legends to be factual accounts of their remote past. In particular, creation myths take place in a primordial age when the world had not achieved its later form. Origin myths explain how a society's customs, institutions, and taboos were established and sanctified. National myths are narratives about a nation's past that symbolize the nation's values. There is a complex relationship between recital of myths and the enactment of rituals.

== Etymology ==
The word myth comes from Ancient Greek μῦθος (mȳthos), meaning 'speech', 'narrative', or 'fiction'. In turn, Ancient Greek μυθολογία (mythología 'story', 'legends', or 'story-telling') combines the word mȳthos with the suffix -λογία (-logia 'study'). Accordingly, Plato used mythología as a general term for fiction or story-telling of any kind. This word was adapted into other European languages in the early 19th century, in a much narrower sense, as a scholarly term for "[a] traditional story, especially one concerning the early history of a people or explaining a natural or social phenomenon, and typically involving supernatural beings or events."

The Greek term mythología was then borrowed into Late Latin, occurring in the title of Latin author Fabius Planciades Fulgentius' 5th-century Mythologiæ to denote what is now referred to as classical mythology—i.e., Greco-Roman etiological stories involving their gods. Fulgentius's Mythologiæ explicitly treated its subject matter as allegories requiring interpretation and not as true events. The Latin term was then adopted in Middle French as mythologie. Whether from French or Latin usage, English adopted the word mythology in the 15th century, initially meaning 'the exposition of a myth or myths', 'the interpretation of fables', or 'a book of such expositions'. The word is first attested in John Lydgate's Troy Book (c. 1425). (Note: "...I [ Paris ] was ravisched in-to paradys. "And thus this god [sc. Mercury], diuers of liknes, "More wonderful than I can expresse, "Schewed hym silf in his appearance, "Liche as he is discrived in Fulgence, "In the book of his methologies...")

From Lydgate until the 17th or 18th century, mythology meant a moral, fable, allegory or a parable, or collection of traditional stories, (Note: All which [sc. John Mandevil's support of Ctesias's claims] may still be received in some acceptions of morality, and to a pregnant invention, may afford commendable mythologie; but in a natural and proper exposition, it containeth impossibilities, and things inconsistent with truth.) understood to be false. It came eventually to be applied to similar bodies of traditional stories among other polytheistic cultures around the world. Thus mythology entered the English language before myth. Johnson's Dictionary, for example, has an entry for mythology, but not for myth. (Note: Johnson's Dictionary, for example, has entries for mythology, mythologist, mythologize, mythological, and mythologically) Indeed, the Greek loanword mythos (Note: "That Mythology came in upon this Alteration of their [Egyptians' Theology, is obviously evident: for the mingling the History of these Men when Mortals, with what came to be ascribed to them when Gods, would naturally occaion it. And of this Sort we generally find the Mythoi told of them...") (pl. mythoi) and Latinate mythus (Note: "Long before the entire separation of metaphysics from poetry, that is, while yet poesy, in all its several species of verse, music, statuary, &c. continued mythic;—while yet poetry remained the union of the sensuous and the philosophic mind;—the efficient presence of the latter in the synthesis of the two, had manifested itself in the sublime mythus περὶ γενέσεως τοῦ νοῦ ἐν ἀνθρωποῖς concerning the genesis, or the birth of the νοῦς or reason in man.") (pl. mythi) both appeared in English before the first example of myth in 1830. (Note: "According to the rabbi Moses Ben Maimon, Enos, discoursing on the splendor of the heavenly bodies, insisted that, since God had thus exalted them above the other parts of creation, it was but reasonable that we should praise, extol, and honour them. The consequence of this exhortation, says the rabbi, was the building of temples to the stars, and the establishment of idolatry throughout the world. By the Arabian divines, the imputation is laid upon the patriarch Abraham; who, they say, on coming out from the dark cave in which he had been brought up, was so astonished at the sight of the stars, that he worshipped Hesperus, the Moon, and the Sun successively as they rose. These two stories are good illustrations of the origin of myths, by means of which, even the most natural sentiment is traced to its cause in the circumstances of fabulous history.)

== Protagonists and structure ==
The main characters in myths are usually non-humans, such as gods, demigods, and other supernatural figures. Others include humans, animals, or combinations in their classification of myth. Stories of everyday humans, although often of leaders of some type, are usually contained in legends, as opposed to myths. Myths are sometimes distinguished from legends in that myths deal with gods, usually have no historical basis, and are set in a world of the remote past, very different from that of the present.

== Definitions ==
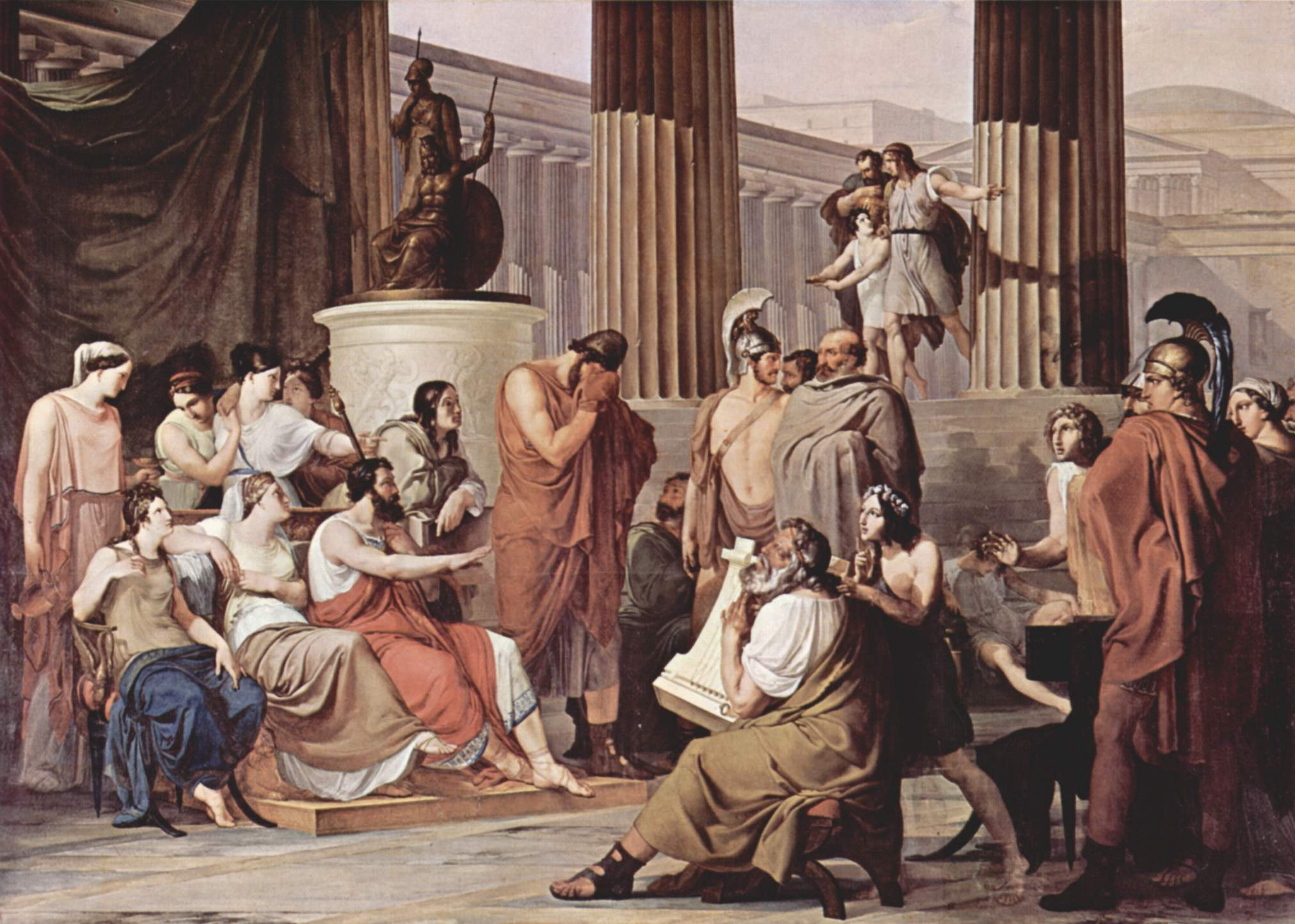
Odysseus Overcome by Demodocus' Song, a mythological painting by Francesco Hayez, 1813–1815

Definitions of myth vary to some extent among scholars, though Finnish folklorist Lauri Honko offers a widely-cited definition:

Myth, a story of the gods, a religious account of the beginning of the world, the creation, fundamental events, the exemplary deeds of the gods as a result of which the world, nature and culture were created together with all parts thereof and given their order, which still obtains. A myth expresses and confirms society's religious values and norms, it provides a pattern of behavior to be imitated, testifies to the efficacy of ritual with its practical ends and establishes the sanctity of cult.

Professor José Manuel Losada defines myth as "a functional, symbolic and thematic narrative of one or several extraordinary events with a transcendent, sacred and supernatural referent; that lacks, in principle, historical testimony; and that refers to an individual or collective, but always absolute, cosmogony or eschatology". According to the holistic myth research by assyriologist Annette Zgoll and classic philologist Christian Zgoll, "A myth can be defined as an Erzählstoff [narrative material] which is polymorphic through its variants and – depending on the variant – polystratic; an Erzählstoff in which transcending interpretations of what can be experienced are combined into a hyleme sequence with an implicit claim to relevance for the interpretation and mastering of the human condition."

Scholars in other fields use the term myth in varied ways. In a broad sense, the word can refer to any traditional story, popular misconception or imaginary entity.

Though myth and other folklore genres may overlap, myth is often thought to differ from genres such as legend and folktale in that neither are considered to be sacred narratives. Some kinds of folktales, such as fairy stories, are not considered true by anyone, and may be seen as distinct from myths for this reason. Main characters in myths are usually gods, demigods or supernatural humans, while legends generally feature humans as their main characters. Many exceptions and combinations exist, as in the Iliad, Odyssey and Aeneid. Moreover, as stories spread between cultures or as faiths change, myths can come to be considered folktales, their divine characters recast as either as humans or demihumans such as giants, elves and faeries. Conversely, historical and literary material may acquire mythological qualities over time. For example, the Matter of Britain (the legendary history of Great Britain, especially those focused on King Arthur and the knights of the Round Table) and the Matter of France, seem distantly to originate in historical events of the 5th and 8th centuries, respectively, and became mythologised over the following centuries.

In colloquial use, myth can also be used of a collectively held belief that has no basis in fact, or any false story. This usage, which is often pejorative, arose from labelling the religious myths and beliefs of other cultures as incorrect, but it has spread to cover non-religious beliefs as well.

As commonly used by folklorists and academics in other relevant fields, such as anthropology, myth has no implication whether the narrative may be understood as true or otherwise. Among biblical scholars of both the Old and New Testament, the word myth has a technical meaning, in that it usually refers to "describe the actions of the other‐worldly in terms of this world" such as the Creation and the Fall.

Since myth is popularly used to describe stories that are not objectively true, the identification of a narrative as a myth can be highly controversial. Many religious adherents believe that the narratives told in their respective religious traditions are historical without question, and so object to their identification as myths while labelling traditional narratives from other religions as such. Hence, some scholars may label all religious narratives as "myths" for practical reasons, such as to avoid depreciating any one tradition because cultures interpret each other differently relative to one another. Other scholars may abstain from using the term myth altogether for purposes of avoiding placing pejorative overtones on sacred narratives.

=== Related terms ===
==== Mythology ====
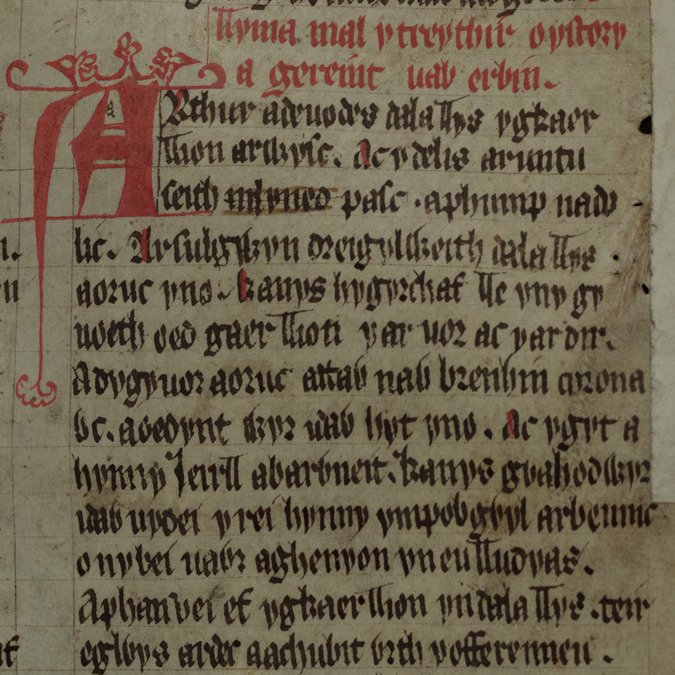
Opening lines of one of the Mabinogi myths from the Red Book of Hergest (written pre-13th century, incorporating pre-Roman myths of Celtic gods): Gereint vab Erbin. Arthur a deuodes dala llys yg Caerllion ar Wysc... (Geraint the son of Erbin. Arthur was accustomed to hold his Court at Caerlleon upon Usk...)

In present use, mythology usually refers to the collection of myths of a group of people. For example, Greek mythology, Roman mythology, Celtic mythology and Hittite mythology all describe the body of myths retold among those cultures.

"Mythology" can also refer to the study of myths and mythologies.

==== Mythography ====
The compilation or description of myths is sometimes known as "mythography", a term also used for a scholarly anthology of myths or of the study of myths generally.

Key mythographers in the Classical tradition include:

- Ovid (43 BCE – 17/18 CE), whose tellings of myths have been profoundly influential;
- Fabius Planciades Fulgentius, a Latin writer of the late-5th to early-6th centuries, whose Mythologies (Latin: Mitologiarum libri III) gathered and gave moralistic interpretations of a wide range of myths;
- the anonymous medieval Vatican Mythographers, who developed anthologies of Classical myths that remained influential to the end of the Middle Ages; and
- Renaissance scholar Natalis Comes, whose ten-book Mythologiae became a standard source for classical mythology in later Renaissance Europe.

Other prominent mythographies include the thirteenth-century Prose Edda attributed to the Icelander Snorri Sturluson, which is the main surviving survey of Norse Mythology from the Middle Ages.

Jeffrey G. Snodgrass (professor of anthropology at the Colorado State University) has termed India's Bhats as mythographers.

==== Myth criticism ====
Myth criticism is a system of anthropological interpretation of culture created by French philosopher Gilbert Durand. Scholars have used myth criticism to explain the mythical roots of contemporary fiction, which means that modern myth criticism needs to be interdisciplinary. Traditional myth critics like Georges Dumézil, Hans Blumenberg, Kurt Hübner, and Pierre Brunel have created paradigmatic systems and clarified the meanings of myths within their original sources, evolution, and con texts.

"This traditional approach to myth criticism proves effective when examining myths in pre-modern literature, identifying literary sources, tracing linguistic evolution, exploring intertextual relationships, and understanding social, psychological, and anthropological dimensions".

==== Mythos ====
Because myth is sometimes used in a pejorative sense, some scholars have opted for mythos instead. "Mythos" now more commonly refers to its Aristotelian sense as a "plot point" or to a body of interconnected myths or stories, especially those belonging to a particular religious or cultural tradition. It is sometimes used specifically for modern, fictional mythologies, such as the world building of H. P. Lovecraft.

==== Mythopoeia ====
Mythopoeia (mytho- + -poeia, 'I make myth') was termed by J. R. R. Tolkien, amongst others, to refer to the "conscious generation" of mythology.

== Interpretations ==
=== Comparative mythology ===
Comparative mythology is a systematic comparison of myths from different cultures. It seeks to discover underlying themes that are common to the myths of multiple cultures. In some cases, comparative mythologists use the similarities between separate mythologies to argue that those mythologies have a common source. This source may inspire myths or provide a common "protomythology" that diverged into the mythologies of each culture.

=== Functionalism ===
A number of commentators have argued that myths function to form and shape society and social behaviour. Eliade argued that one of the foremost functions of myth is to establish models for behavior and that myths may provide a religious experience. By telling or reenacting myths, members of traditional societies detach themselves from the present, returning to the mythical age, thereby coming closer to the divine.

Honko asserted that, in some cases, a society reenacts a myth in an attempt to reproduce the conditions of the mythical age. For example, it might reenact the healing performed by a god at the beginning of time in order to heal someone in the present. Similarly, Barthes argued that modern culture explores religious experience. Since it is not the job of science to define human morality, a religious experience is an attempt to connect with a perceived moral past, which is in contrast with the technological present.

Pattanaik defines mythology as "the subjective truth of people communicated through stories, symbols and rituals." He says, "Facts are everybody's truth. Fiction is nobody's truth. Myths are somebody's truth."

=== Euhemerism ===
One theory claims that myths are distorted accounts of historical events. According to this theory, storytellers repeatedly elaborate upon historical accounts until the figures in those accounts gain the status of gods. For example, the myth of the wind-god Aeolus may have evolved from a historical account of a king who taught his people to use sails and interpret the winds. Herodotus (5th century BCE) and Prodicus made claims of this kind. This theory is named euhemerism after mythologist Euhemerus (c. 320 BCE), who suggested that Greek gods developed from legends about humans.

=== Allegory ===
Some theories propose that myths began as allegories for natural phenomena: Apollo represents the sun, Poseidon represents water, and so on. According to another theory, myths began as allegories for philosophical or spiritual concepts: Athena represents wise judgment, Aphrodite romantic desire, and so on. Müller supported an allegorical theory of myth. He believed myths began as allegorical descriptions of nature and gradually came to be interpreted literally. For example, a poetic description of the sea as "raging" was eventually taken literally and the sea was then thought of as a raging god.

=== Personification ===
Some thinkers claimed that myths result from the personification of objects and forces. According to these thinkers, the ancients worshiped natural phenomena, such as fire and air, gradually deifying them. For example, according to this theory, ancients tended to view things as gods, not as mere objects. Thus, they described natural events as acts of personal gods, giving rise to myths.

=== Ritualism ===
According to the myth-ritual theory, myth is tied to ritual. In its most extreme form, this theory claims myths arose to explain rituals. This claim was first put forward by Smith, who argued that people begin performing rituals for reasons not related to myth. Forgetting the original reason for a ritual, they account for it by inventing a myth and claiming the ritual commemorates the events described in that myth. James George Frazer—author of The Golden Bough, a book on the comparative study of mythology and religion—argued that humans started out with a belief in magical rituals; later, they began to lose faith in magic and invented myths about gods, reinterpreting their rituals as religious rituals intended to appease the gods.

== Academic discipline history ==
Historically, important approaches to the study of mythology have included those of Vico, Schelling, Schiller, Jung, Freud, Lévy-Bruhl, Lévi-Strauss, Frye, the Soviet school, and the Myth and Ritual School.

=== Ancient Greece ===
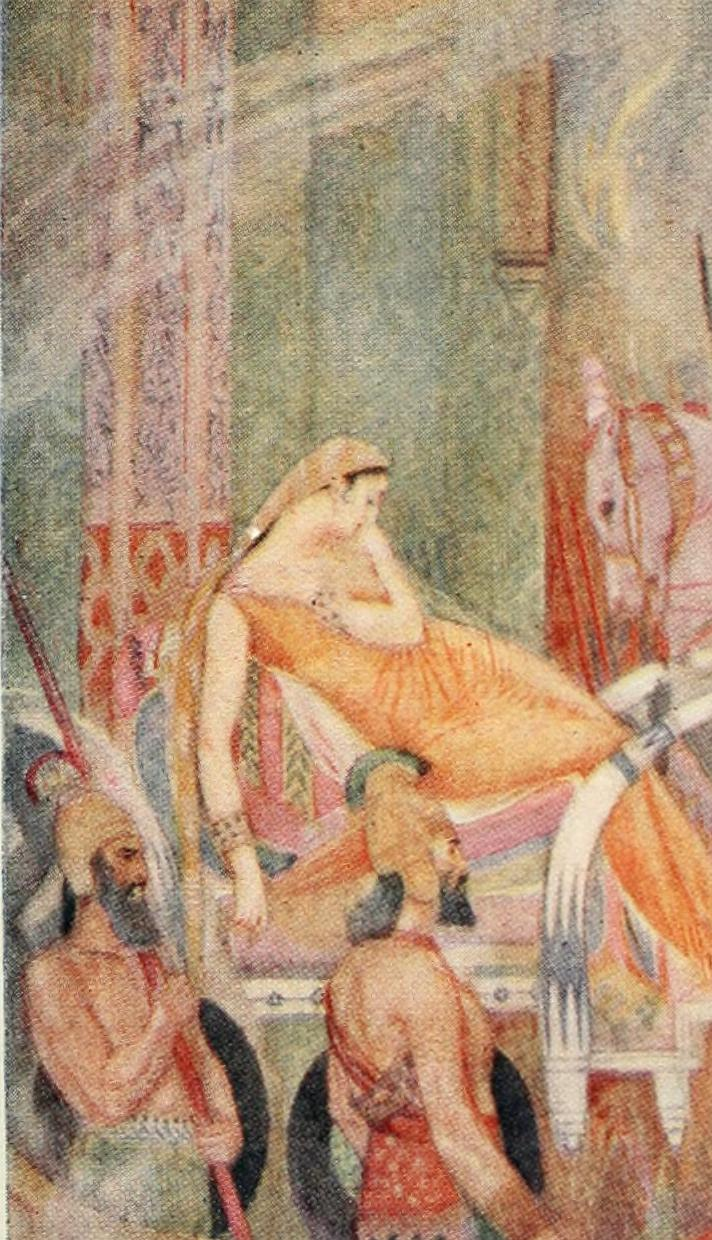
Myths and legends of Babylonia and Assyria (1916)

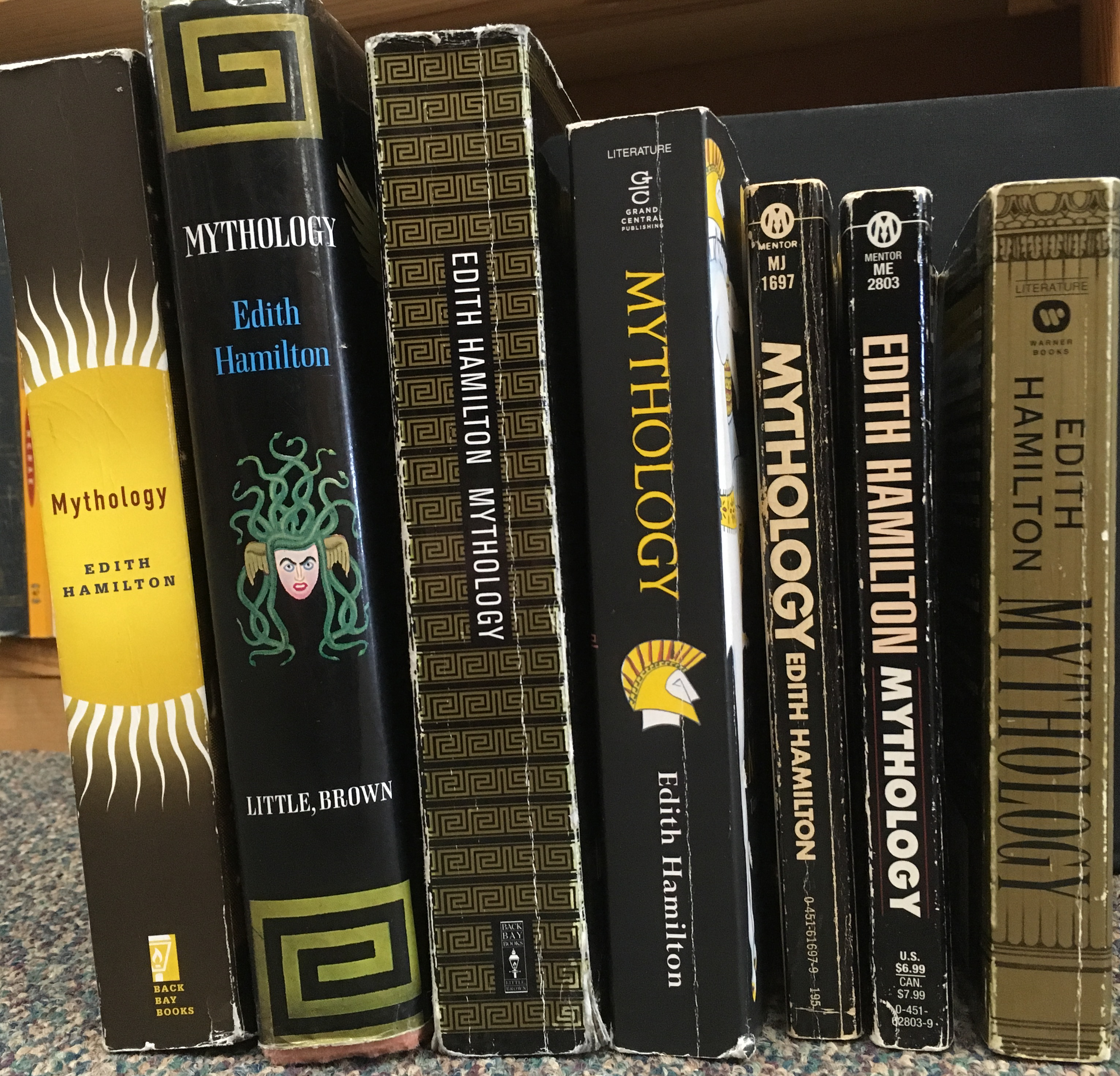
Edith Hamilton's Mythology has been a major channel for English speakers to learn classical Greek and Roman mythology

The critical interpretation of myth began with the Presocratics. Euhemerus was one of the most important pre-modern mythologists. He interpreted myths as accounts of actual historical events, though distorted over many retellings.

Sallustius divided myths into five categories:

- theological;
- physical (or concerning natural law);
- animistic (or concerning soul);
- material; and
- mixed, which concerns myths that show the interaction between two or more of the previous categories and are particularly used in initiations.

Plato condemned poetic myth when discussing education in the Republic. His critique was primarily on the grounds that the uneducated might take the stories of gods and heroes literally. Nevertheless, he constantly referred to myths throughout his writings. As Platonism developed in the phases commonly called Middle Platonism and neoplatonism, writers such as Plutarch, Porphyry, Proclus, Olympiodorus, and Damascius wrote explicitly about the symbolic interpretation of traditional and Orphic myths.

Mythological themes were consciously employed in literature, beginning with Homer. The resulting work may expressly refer to a mythological background without itself becoming part of a body of myths (Cupid and Psyche). Medieval romance in particular plays with this process of turning myth into literature. Euhemerism, as stated earlier, refers to the rationalization of myths, putting themes formerly imbued with mythological qualities into pragmatic contexts. An example of this would be following a cultural or religious paradigm shift (notably the re-interpretation of pagan mythology following Christianization).

=== European Renaissance ===
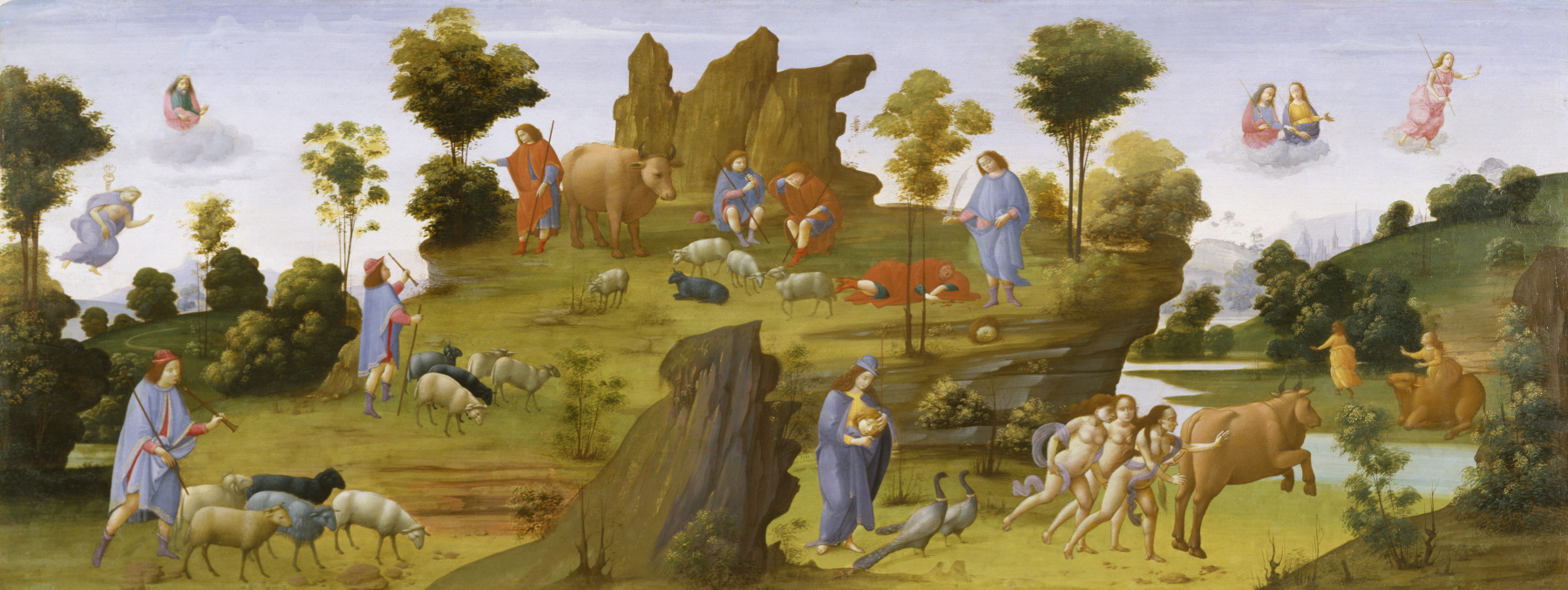
This panel by Bartolomeo di Giovanni relates the second half of the Metamorphoses. In the upper left, Jupiter emerges from clouds to order Mercury to rescue Io.

Interest in polytheistic mythology revived during the Renaissance, with early works of mythography appearing in the sixteenth century, among them the Theologia Mythologica (1532).

=== 19th century ===
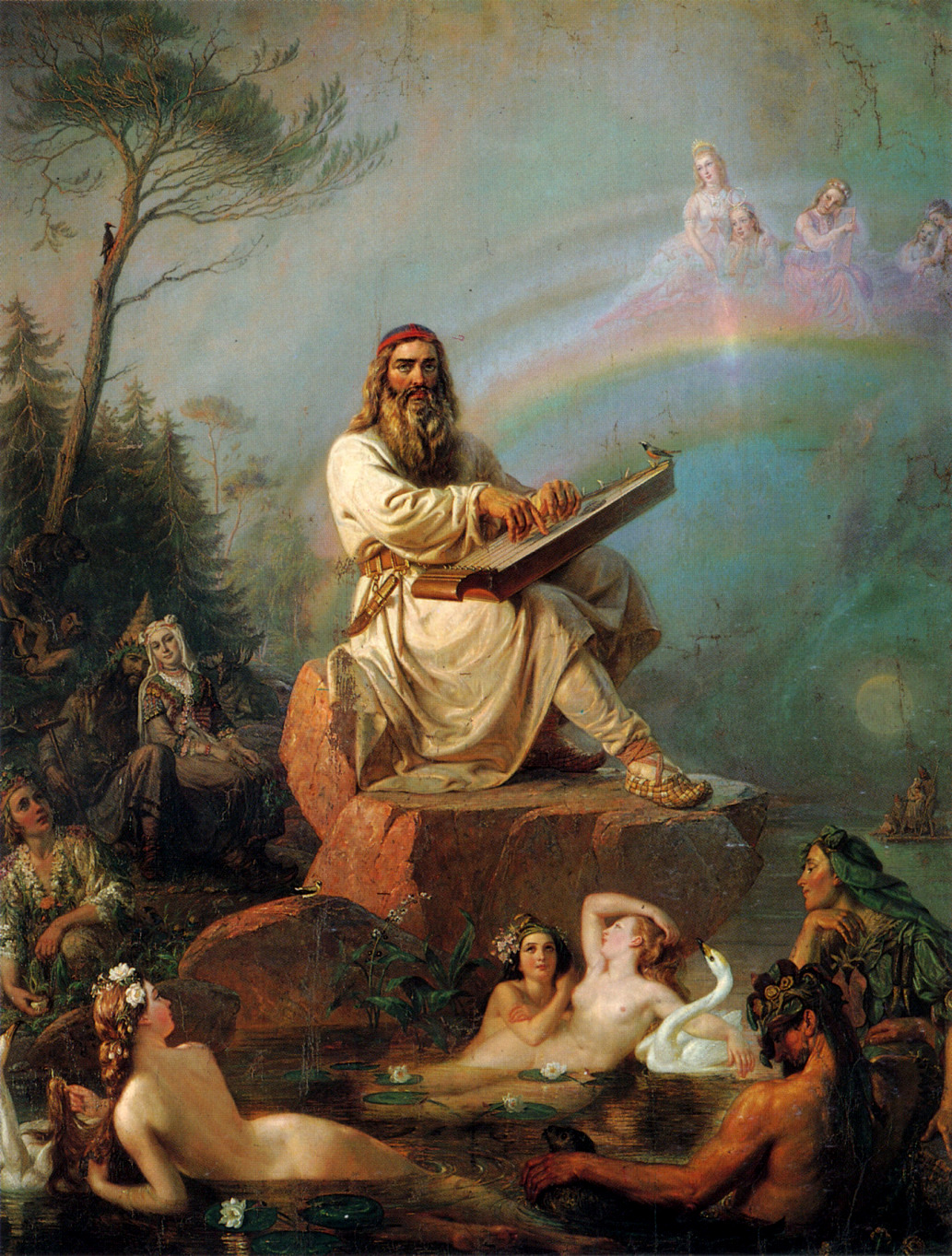
Väinämöinen, the wise demigod and one of the significant characters of Finnish mythological 19th-century epic poetry, The Kalevala (Väinämöinen's Play, Robert Wilhelm Ekman, 1866)

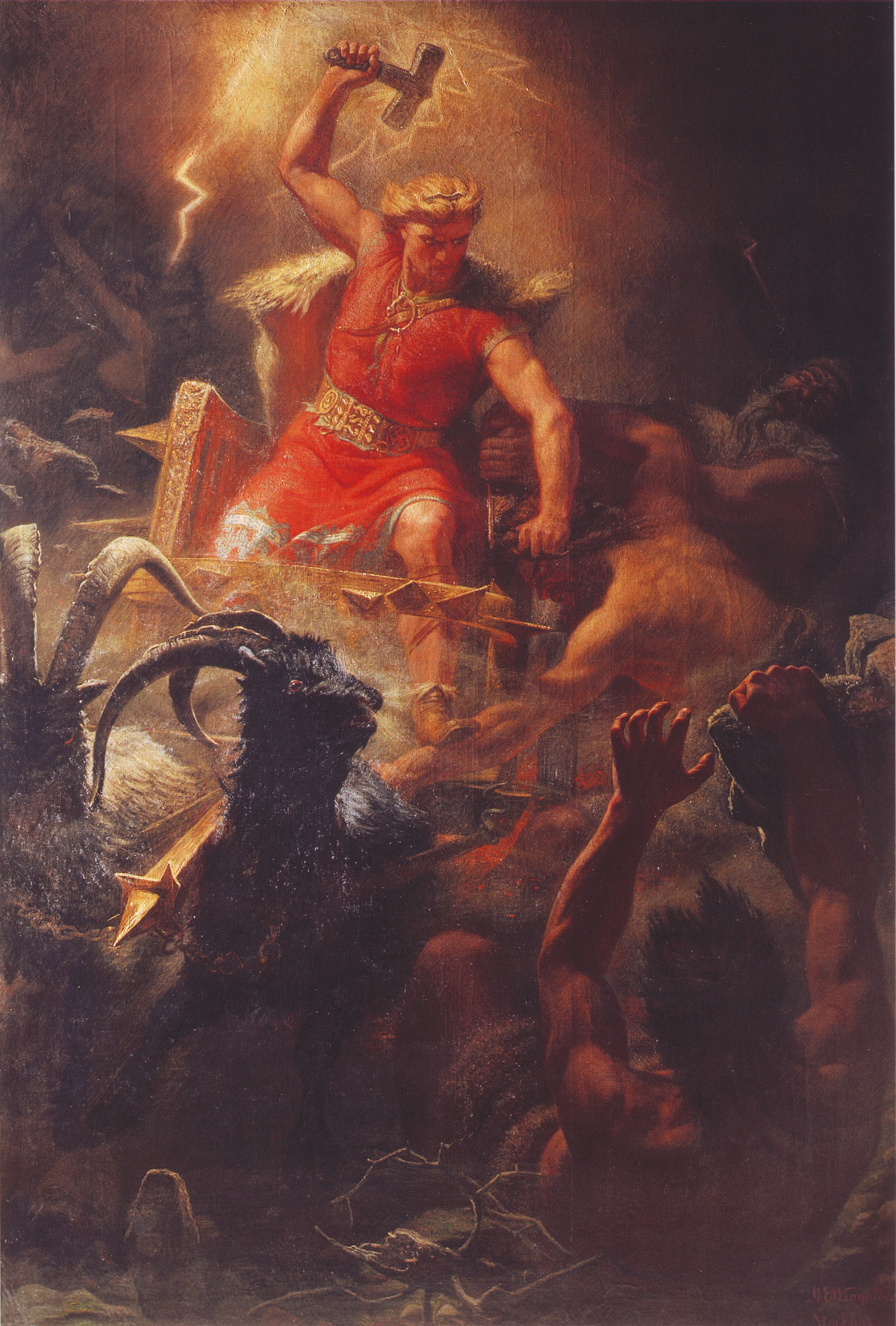
Thor's Fight with the Giants (1872) by Mårten Eskil Winge. Thor is the god of thunder in Norse mythology.

The first modern, Western scholarly theories of myth appeared during the second half of the 19th century—at the same time as "myth" was adopted as a scholarly term in European languages. They were driven partly by a new interest in Europe's ancient past and vernacular culture, associated with Romantic Nationalism and epitomised by the research of Jacob Grimm (1785–1863). This movement drew European scholars' attention not only to Classical myths, but also material now associated with Norse mythology, Finnish mythology, and so forth. Western theories were also partly driven by Europeans' efforts to comprehend and control the cultures, stories and religions they were encountering through colonialism. These encounters included both extremely old texts such as the Sanskrit Rigveda and the Sumerian Epic of Gilgamesh, and current oral narratives such as mythologies of the indigenous peoples of the Americas or stories told in traditional African religions.

The intellectual context for nineteenth-century scholars was profoundly shaped by emerging ideas about evolution. These ideas included the recognition that many Eurasian languages—and therefore, conceivably, stories—were all descended from a lost common ancestor (the Indo-European language) which could rationally be reconstructed through the comparison of its descendant languages. They also included the idea that cultures might evolve in ways comparable to species. In general, 19th-century theories framed myth as a failed or obsolete mode of thought, often by interpreting myth as the primitive counterpart of modern science within a unilineal framework that imagined that human cultures are travelling, at different speeds, along a linear path of cultural development.

==== Nature ====
One of the dominant mythological theories of the latter 19th century was nature mythology, the foremost exponents of which included Max Müller and Edward Burnett Tylor. This theory posited that "primitive man" was primarily concerned with the natural world. It tended to interpret myths that seemed distasteful to European Victorians—such as tales about sex, incest, or cannibalism—as metaphors for natural phenomena like agricultural fertility. Unable to conceive impersonal natural laws, early humans tried to explain natural phenomena by attributing souls to inanimate objects, thus giving rise to animism.

According to Tylor, human thought evolved through stages, starting with mythological ideas and gradually progressing to scientific ideas. Müller also saw myth as originating from language, even calling myth a "disease of language". He speculated that myths arose due to the lack of abstract nouns and neuter gender in ancient languages. Anthropomorphic figures of speech, necessary in such languages, were eventually taken literally, leading to the idea that natural phenomena were in actuality conscious or divine. Not all scholars, not even all 19th-century scholars, accepted this view. Lucien Lévy-Bruhl claimed that "the primitive mentality is a condition of the human mind and not a stage in its historical development." Recent scholarship, noting the fundamental lack of evidence for "nature mythology" interpretations among people who actually circulated myths, has likewise abandoned the key ideas of "nature mythology".

==== Ritual ====
Frazer saw myths as a misinterpretation of magical rituals, which were themselves based on a mistaken idea of natural law. This idea was central to the "myth and ritual" school of thought. According to Frazer, humans begin with an unfounded belief in impersonal magical laws. When they realize applications of these laws do not work, they give up their belief in natural law in favor of a belief in personal gods controlling nature, thus giving rise to religious myths. Meanwhile, humans continue practicing formerly magical rituals through force of habit, reinterpreting them as reenactments of mythical events. Finally, humans come to realize nature follows natural laws, and they discover their true nature through science. Here again, science makes myth obsolete as humans progress "from magic through religion to science." Segal asserted that by pitting mythical thought against modern scientific thought, such theories imply modern humans must abandon myth.

=== 20th century ===
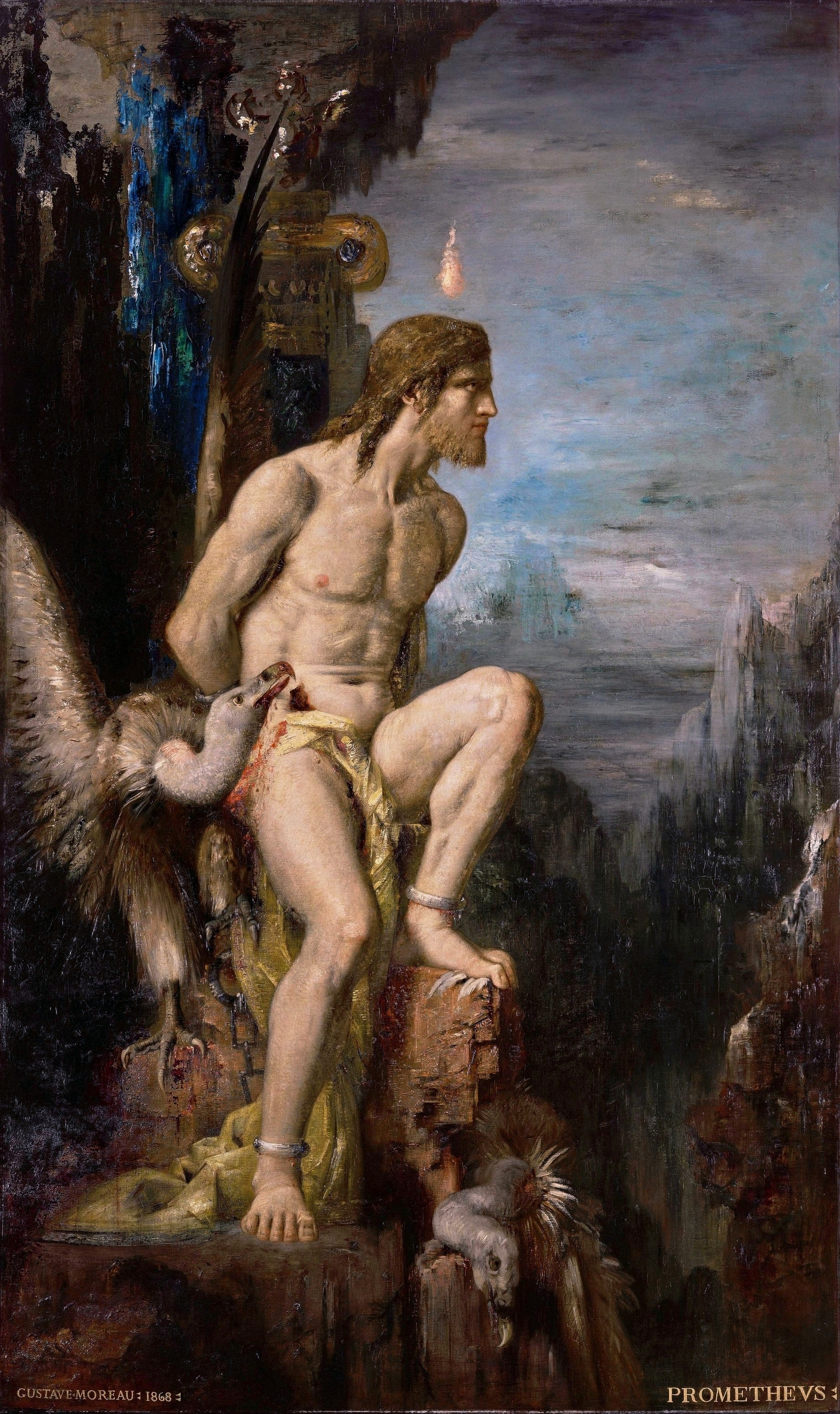
Prometheus (1868) by Gustave Moreau. In the mythos of Hesiodus and possibly Aeschylus (the Greek trilogy Prometheus Bound, Prometheus Unbound and Prometheus Pyrphoros), Prometheus is bound and tortured for giving fire to humanity.

The earlier 20th century saw major work developing psychoanalytical approaches to interpreting myth, led by Sigmund Freud, who, drawing inspiration from Classical myth, began developing the concept of the Oedipus complex in his 1899 The Interpretation of Dreams. Jung likewise tried to understand the psychology behind world myths. Jung asserted that all humans share certain innate unconscious psychological forces, which he called archetypes. He believed similarities between the myths of different cultures reveals the existence of these universal archetypes.

The mid-20th century saw the influential development of a structuralist theory of mythology, led by Lévi-Strauss. Strauss argued that myths reflect patterns in the mind and interpreted those patterns more as fixed mental structures, specifically pairs of opposites (good/evil, compassionate/callous), rather than unconscious feelings or urges. Meanwhile, Bronislaw Malinowski developed analyses of myths focusing on their social functions in the real world. He is associated with the idea that myths such as origin stories might provide a "mythic charter"—a legitimisation—for cultural norms and social institutions. Thus, following the Structuralist Era (c. 1960s–1980s), the predominant anthropological and sociological approaches to myth increasingly treated myth as a form of narrative that can be studied, interpreted, and analyzed like ideology, history, and culture. In other words, myth is a form of understanding and telling stories that are connected to power, political structures, and political and economic interests.

These approaches contrast with approaches, such as those of Joseph Campbell and Eliade, which hold that myth has some type of essential connection to ultimate sacred meanings that transcend cultural specifics. In particular, myth was studied in relation to history from diverse social sciences. Most of these studies share the assumption that history and myth are not distinct in the sense that history is factual, real, accurate, and truth, while myth is the opposite.

In the 1950s, Barthes published a series of essays examining modern myths and the process of their creation in his book Mythologies, which stood as an early work in the emerging post-structuralist approach to mythology, which recognised myths' existence in the modern world and in popular culture.

The 20th century saw rapid secularization in Western culture. This made Western scholars more willing to analyse narratives in the Abrahamic religions as myths; theologians such as Rudolf Bultmann argued that a modern Christianity needed to demythologize; and other religious scholars embraced the idea that the mythical status of Abrahamic narratives was a legitimate feature of their importance. This, in his appendix to Myths, Dreams and Mysteries, and in The Myth of the Eternal Return, Eliade attributed modern humans' anxieties to their rejection of myths and the sense of the sacred.

The Christian theologian Conrad Hyers wrote:

[M]yth today has come to have negative connotations which are the complete opposite of its meaning in a religious context... In a religious context, myths are storied vehicles of supreme truth, the most basic and important truths of all. By them, people regulate and interpret their lives and find worth and purpose in their existence. Myths put one in touch with sacred realities, the fundamental sources of being, power, and truth. They are seen not only as being the opposite of error but also as being clearly distinguishable from stories told for entertainment and from the workaday, domestic, practical language of a people. They provide answers to the mysteries of being and becoming, mysteries which, as mysteries, are hidden, yet mysteries which are revealed through story and ritual. Myths deal not only with truth but with ultimate truth.

=== 21st century ===
Both in 19th-century research, which tended to see existing records of stories and folklore as imperfect fragments of partially lost myths, and in 20th-century structuralist work, which sought to identify underlying patterns and structures in often diverse versions of a given myth, there had been a tendency to synthesise sources to attempt to reconstruct what scholars supposed to be more perfect or underlying forms of myths. From the late 20th century, researchers influenced by postmodernism tended instead to argue that each account of a given myth has its own cultural significance and meaning, and argued that rather than representing degradation from a once more perfect form, myths are inherently plastic and variable. There is, consequently, no such thing as the 'original version' or 'original form' of a myth. One prominent example of this movement was A. K. Ramanujan's essay "Three Hundred Ramayanas".

Correspondingly, scholars challenged the precedence that had once been given to texts as a medium for mythology, arguing that other media, such as the visual arts or even landscape and place-naming, could be as or more important. Myths are not texts, but narrative materials (Erzählstoffe) that can be adapted in various media (such as epics, hymns, handbooks, movies, dances, etc.). In contrast to other academic approaches, which primarily focus on the (social) function of myths, hylistic myth research aims to understand myths and their nature out of themselves. As part of the Göttingen myth research, Annette and Christian Zgoll developed the method of hylistics (narrative material research) to extract mythical materials from their media and make possible a transmedial comparison. The content of the medium is broken down into the smallest possible plot components (hylemes), which are listed in standardized form (so-called hyleme analysis). Inconsistencies in content can indicate stratification, i.e. the overlapping of several materials, narrative variants and edition layers within the same medial concretion. To a certain extent, this can also be used to reconstruct earlier and alternative variants of the same material that were in competition and/or were combined with each other. The juxtaposition of hyleme sequences enables the systematic comparison of different variants of the same material or several different materials that are related or structurally similar to each other. In his overall presentation of the hundred-year history of myth research, the classical philologist and myth researcher Udo Reinhardt mentions Christian Zgoll's basic work Tractatus mythologicus as "the latest handbook on myth theory" with "outstanding significance" for modern myth research.

== Modernity ==
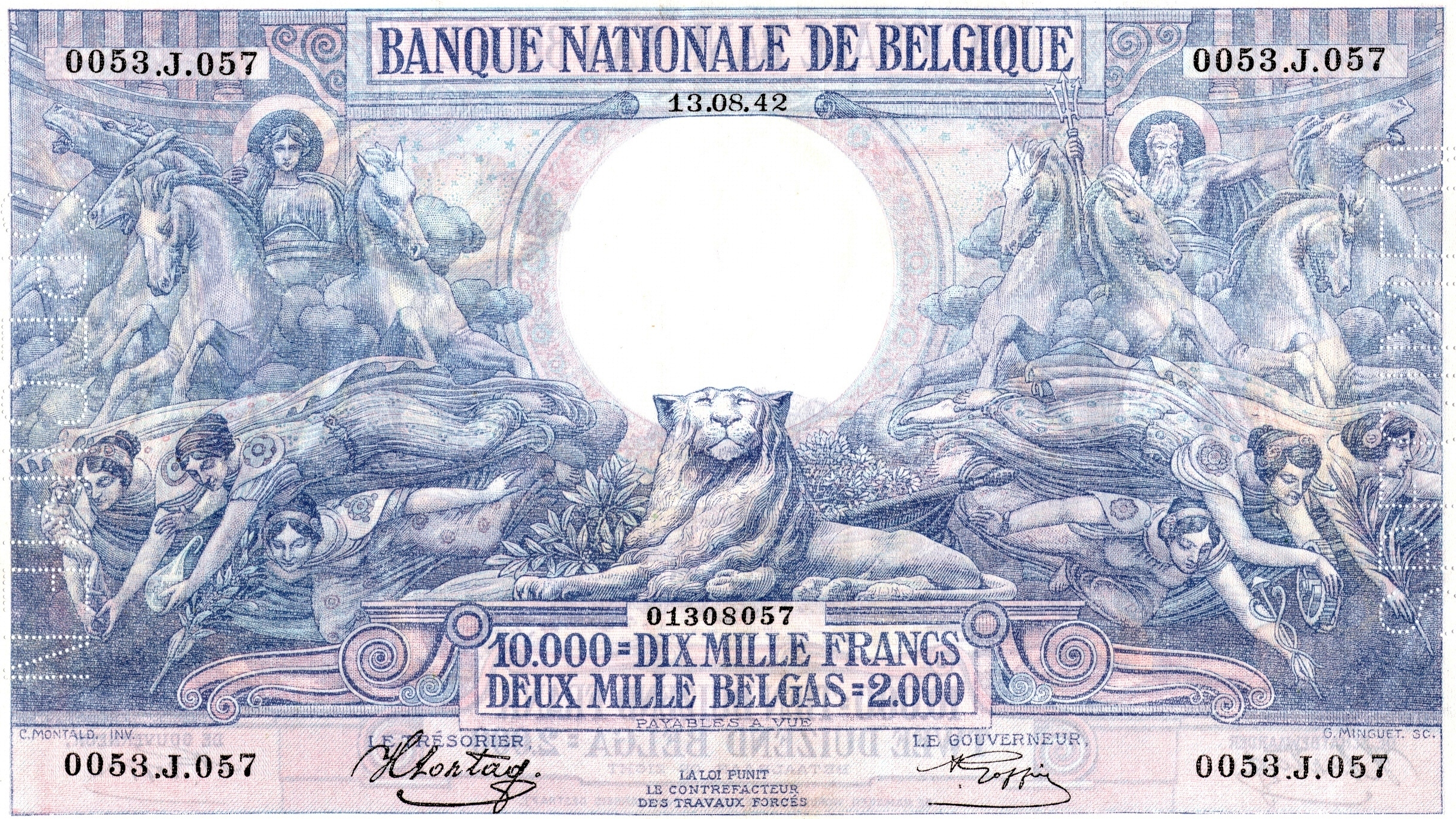
1929 Belgian banknote, depicting Ceres, Neptune and caduceus

Scholars in the field of cultural studies research how myth has worked itself into modern discourses. Mythological discourse can reach greater audiences than ever before via digital media. Various mythic elements appear in popular culture, as well as television, cinema and video games.

Although myth was traditionally transmitted through the oral tradition on a small scale, the film industry has enabled filmmakers to transmit myths to large audiences via film. In Jungian psychology, myths are the expression of a culture or society's goals, fears, ambitions and dreams.

The basis of modern visual storytelling is rooted in the mythological tradition. Many contemporary films rely on ancient myths to construct narratives. The Walt Disney Company is well known among cultural study scholars for "reinventing" traditional childhood myths. While few films are as obvious as Disney fairy tales, the plots of many films are based on the rough structure of myths. Mythological archetypes, such as the cautionary tale regarding the abuse of technology, battles between gods and creation stories, are often the subject of major film productions. These films are often created under the guise of cyberpunk action films, fantasy, dramas and apocalyptic tales.

21st-century films such as Clash of the Titans, Immortals and Thor continue the trend of using traditional mythology to frame modern plots. Authors use mythology as a basis for their books, such as Rick Riordan, whose Percy Jackson and the Olympians series is situated in a modern-day world where the Greek deities are manifest.

Scholars, particularly those within the field of fan studies, and fans of popular culture have also noted a connection between fan fiction and myth. Ika Willis identified three models of this: fan fiction as a reclaiming of popular stories from corporations, myth as a means of critiquing or dismantling hegemonic power, and myth as "a commons of story and a universal story world". Willis supports the third model, a universal story world, and argues that fanfiction can be seen as mythic due to its hyperseriality—a term invented by Sarah Iles Johnston to describe a hyperconnected universe in which characters and stories are interwoven. In an interview for the New York Times, Henry Jenkins stated that fanfiction 'is a way of the culture repairing the damage done in a system where contemporary myths are owned by corporations instead of owned by the folk.'

== See also ==
- Cultural myth criticism, a 2022 theoretical framework proposed by José Manuel Losada
- List of mythologies
- List of mythological objects
- List of mythology books and sources
- Magic and mythology
- Mytheme
- Mythopoeia, artificially constructed mythology, mainly for the purpose of storytelling
- Myth: Its Meaning and Functions in Ancient and Other Cultures by G. S. Kirk
- Myth=Mithya: A Handbook of Hindu Mythology

== Sources ==
- "Basque Mythology". Public Reading Network of the Basque Country. 2018. Archived from the original on 31 May 2020.
- "Myth Archived 7 September 2008 at the Wayback Machine". Encyclopædia Britannica. 2009. 21 March 2009.
- Anderson, Albert A. (2004), "Mythos, Logos, and Telos: How to Regain the Love of Wisdom", in Anderson, Albert A.; Hicks, Steven V.; Witkowski, Lech (eds.), Mythos and Logos: How to Regain the Love of Wisdom, Rodopi, ISBN 978-90-420-1020-8
- Apollodorus (1976). "Introduction". Gods and Heroes of the Greeks: The Library of Apollodorus. Translated by Simpson, Michael. Amherst: University of Massachusetts Press. ISBN 978-0-87023-206-0.
- Armstrong, Karen (2010). A Short History of Myth (Myths series). Knopf Canada. ISBN 978-0-307-36729-7.
- Barthes, Roland (1972). Mythologies. Translated by Annette Lavers. Hill and Wang. ISBN 978-0-37-452150-9.
- Bascom, William Russell (1965). The Forms of Folklore: Prose Narratives. University of California.
- Bowker, John (2005). "Euhemerism". The Concise Oxford Dictionary of World Religions. Oxford University Press. ISBN 978-0-19-861053-3.
- Bulfinch, Thomas (2004). Bulfinch's Mythology. Kessinger Publishing. ISBN 978-1-4191-1109-9.
- Corner, John (1999). Critical Ideas in Television Studies. Clarendon Press. ISBN 978-0-19-874221-0.
- Doniger, Wendy (2004). Hindu Myths: A Sourcebook Translated from the Sanskrit. Penguin Books Limited. ISBN 978-0-14-190375-0.
- Doty, William G. (2004). Myth: A Handbook. Greenwood Publishing Group. ISBN 978-0-313-32696-7.
- Downing, Christine (1996). The Goddess: Mythological Images of the Feminine. Continuum.
- Dundes, Alan (1996). "Madness in Method Plus a Plea for Projective Inversion in Myth". In L. L. Patton and W. Doniger (ed.). Myth and Method. University of Virginia Press. pp. 147–. ISBN 978-0-8139-1657-6.
- — (1997). "Binary Opposition in Myth: The Propp/Levi-Strauss Debate in Retrospect." Western Folklore 56(Winter): 39–50.
- —, ed. (1984). Sacred Narrative: Readings in the Theory of Myth. University of California Press. ISBN 978-0-520-05192-8.
  - Honko, Lauri. "The Problem of Defining Myth". In Dundes (1984).
  - Kirk, G. S. "On Defining Myths". In Dundes (1984), pp. 53–61.
  - Pettazzoni, Raffaele. "The Truth of Myth". In Dundes (1984).
- Lincoln, Bruce (1999). "The Prehistory of Mythos and Logos". Theorizing Myth: Narrative, Ideology, and Scholarship. University of Chicago Press. ISBN 978-0-226-48202-6.
- Eliade, Mircea (1960). Myths, dreams, and mysteries: the encounter between contemporary faiths and archaic realities. Translated by Mairet, Philip. Harvill Press. ISBN 978-0-06-131320-2.
- — (1998). Myth and Reality. Waveland Press. ISBN 978-1-4786-0861-5.
- Fabiani, Paolo "The Philosophy of the Imagination in Vico and Malebranche". F.U.P. (Florence UP), English edition 2009. Archived 12 May 2011 at the Wayback Machine PDF
- Frankfort, Henri; Frankfort, H.A.; Wilson, John A.; Jacobsen, Thorkild; Irwin, William A. (2013). The Intellectual Adventure of Ancient Man: An Essay of Speculative Thought in the Ancient Near East. University of Chicago Press. ISBN 978-0-226-11256-5.
- Frazer, Sir James George (1913). The Golden Bough: A Study in Magic and Religion. Macmillan and Company, limited. pp. 10–.
- Graf, Fritz (1996). Greek Mythology: An Introduction. Translated by Marier, Thomas. Johns Hopkins University Press. ISBN 978-0-8018-5395-1.
- Humphrey, Sheryl (2012). The Haunted Garden: Death and Transfiguration in the Folklore of Plants. New York: DCA Art Fund Grant from the Council on the Arts and Humanities for Staten Island and public funding from the New York City Department of Cultural Affairs. ISBN 978-1-300-55364-9.
- Hyers, Conradl (1984). The Meaning of Creation: Genesis and Modern Science. Westminster John Knox Press. ISBN 978-0-8042-0125-4.
- Indick, William (2004). "Classical Heroes in Modern Movies: Mythological Patterns of the Superhero". Journal of Media Psychology. 9 (3): 93–95.
- Kirk, Geoffrey Stephen (1973). Myth: Its Meaning and Functions in Ancient and Other Cultures. University of California Press. ISBN 978-0-520-02389-5.
- Koven, Mikel J. (22 May 2003). "Folklore Studies and Popular Film and Television: A Necessary Critical Survey". Journal of American Folklore. 116 (460): 176–195. doi:10.1353/jaf.2003.0027. ISSN 1535-1882. S2CID 163091590.
- Leonard, Scott (August 2007). "The History of Mythology: Part I". Youngstown State University. Archived from the original on 27 December 2012.
- Littleton, C. Scott (1973). The New Comparative Mythology: An Anthropological Assessment of the Theories of Georges Dumézil. University of California Press. ISBN 978-0-520-02404-5.
- Losada, José Manuel (2022). Mitocrítica cultural. Una definición del mito (1st ed.). Madrid: Ediciones Akal. p. 8. ISBN 978-8446052678.
- Losada, José Manuel (2025). "Part IV: Afterthought" Antiquity in Progress: Intermedial Presences of Ancient Mediterranean Cultures in the Modern World "Part IV: Afterthought". Heidelberg: Propylaeum. pp. 217–228.
- Matira, Lopamundra (2008). "Children's Oral Literature and Modern Mass Media". Indian Folklore Research Journal. 5 (8): 55–57.
- Meletinsky, Eleazar M. (2014). The Poetics of Myth. Taylor & Francis. ISBN 978-1-135-59913-3.
- Northup, Lesley (2006). "Myth-Placed Priorities: Religion and the Study of Myth." Religious Studies Review 32(1):5–10. doi:10.1111/j.1748-0922.2006.00018.x. ISSN 1748-0922.
- Olson, Eric L. (3 May 2011). Great Expectations: the Role of Myth in 1980s Films with Child Heroes. Virginia Polytechnic Scholarly Library (Thesis). Virginia Polytechnic Institute And State University. hdl:10919/32929. Archived (PDF) from the original on 19 January 2012.
- Segal, Robert (2015). Myth: A Very Short Introduction. OUP Oxford. ISBN 978-0-19-103769-6.
- Simpson, Jacqueline, and Steve Roud, eds. 2003. "Myths." In A Dictionary of English Folklore. Oxford: Oxford University Press. ISBN 978-0191726644.
- Singer, Irving (2010). Cinematic Mythmaking: Philosophy in Film. MIT Press. ISBN 978-0-262-26484-6.
- Slattery, Dennis Patrick (2015). Bridge Work: Essays on Mythology, Literature and Psychology. Carpinteria: Mandorla Books.
- Wiles, David (2000). "Myth". Greek Theatre Performance: An Introduction. Cambridge University Press. ISBN 978-0-521-64857-8.
