= Drift =

Drift or Drifts may refer to:

== Geography ==
- Drift or ford (crossing) of a river
- Drift (navigation), difference between heading and course of a vessel
- Drift, Kentucky, unincorporated community in the United States
- In Cornwall, England:
  - Drift, Cornwall, village
  - Drift Reservoir, associated with the village

== Science, technology, and physics ==
- Diffuse reflectance infrared Fourier transform spectroscopy, a spectroscopic technique
- Directional Recoil Identification from Tracks, a dark-matter experiment
- Drift (video gaming), a typical game-controller malfunction
- Drift pin, metalworking tool for localizing hammer blows and for aligning holes
- Drift (geology), deposited material of glacial origin
- Drift (in mining), a roughly horizontal passage; an adit
- Drift, linear term of a stochastic process
- Drift (motorsport), the controlled sliding of a vehicle through a sharp turn, either via over-steering with sudden sharp braking, or counter-steering with a sudden "clutch kick" acceleration
- Incremental changes:
  - Drift (linguistics), a type of language change
  - Genetic drift, change in allele frequency
  - Drift (telecommunication), long-term change in an attribute of a system or equipment
  - Clock drift - variation in time-keeping
  - Frequency drift - oscillator offset in electrical engineering
  - Concept drift (in data-science and machine-learning applications)

== Film and television ==
- Drift (film series), 2006–2008 film series by Futoshi Jinno
- Drift, 2006 TV crime drama film directed by Paul W. S. Anderson
- Drift, fictional technology system that links the minds of two Jaeger pilots in the 2013 sci-fi film Pacific Rim and its sequel
- Drift, 2007 experimental short film by Max Hattler
- Drift (2013 Australian film), film starring Sam Worthington
- Drift (2013 Belgian film), art house film
- Drift (2015 film), Swiss film
- Drift (2017 film), German film
- Drift (2023 film), a film by Anthony Chen

== Books and Publishing ==
- The Drift (magazine)
- Drift (novel), a 2002 Doctor Who novel
- Drift: The Unmooring of American Military Power, a book by Rachel Maddow
- Plot drift, when a story deviates unexpectedly from its initial direction, in writing, television, or other media.

== Music ==
- The Drift (band), American post-rock band
- Songs:
  - "Drift", 1985 song from work ‘’Secret’’
  - "Drift" (Emily Osment song) (2011)
  - "Drift", end credits song of 2013 film Pacific Rim
- Albums/EPs:
  - Drift (Flotsam and Jetsam album) (1995)
  - The Drift, album by Scott Walker (2006)
  - Drift (Ken Block album) (2008)
  - Drift (Nosaj Thing album) (2009)
  - The Drift (EP), by Michelle Channel and Arjun Singh (2014)
  - Drift (Erra album) (2016)
  - Drift (Underworld project), ongoing music-and-video experiment by that band (2018-2019)
  - Drift (The Devlins album), 1993
- Drift, short for drift phonk, a subgenre of phonk

== See also ==
- Daventry International Rail Freight Terminal (DIRFT), a rail-road intermodal freight terminal in Northamptonshire, England
- Dérive, an unplanned journey through a landscape
- Drifter (disambiguation)
- Drifting (disambiguation)
- Velddrif, a town in South Africa
