= Drifting =

Drifting may refer to:

- Drifting (motorsport)
- Pipe drift or drifting, measuring a pipe's inner roundness

== Film ==
- Drifting (1923 film), a film directed by Tod Browning
- Drifting (1982 film), the first Israeli gay-themed film
- Drifting (2021 film), a film directed by Jun Li

== Music ==
- "Drifting" (Plumb song), 2011
- "Drifting" (G-Eazy song), 2016
- "Driftin' Blues", a 1968 blues song recorded by Charles Brown & Johnny Moore's Three Blazers, Eric Clapton and others
- "Drifting", a song by Jimi Hendrix on his 1971 album The Cry of Love
- "Drifting", a song by 4 Non Blondes on their 1992 album Bigger, Better, Faster, More!
- "Drifting", a song by Salmonella Dub on their 1999 album Killervision
- "Drifting", a song by Pearl Jam on their album 2003 Lost Dogs
- "Drifting", a song by Enya on her album 2005 Amarantine
- "Drifting", a song by Jay Chou from the 2005 album November's Chopin

== See also ==
- Drift (disambiguation)
- Drifter (disambiguation)
