= Mytheme =

Fundamental generic unit of narrative structure

In structuralism-influenced studies of mythology, a mytheme is a fundamental generic unit of narrative structure (typically involving a relationship between a character, an event, and a theme) from which myths are thought to be constructed—a minimal unit that is always found shared with other, related mythemes and reassembled in various ways ("bundled") or linked in more complicated relationships. For example, the myths of Greek Adonis and Egyptian Osiris share several elements, leading some scholars to conclude that they share a source, i.e. images passed down in cultures or from one to another, being ascribed new interpretations of the action depicted, as well as new names in various readings of icons.

== Overview ==
Claude Lévi-Strauss (1908–2009), who gave the term wide circulation, wrote, "If one wants to establish a parallel between structural linguistics and the structural analysis of myths, the correspondence is established, not between mytheme and word but between mytheme and phoneme."

The structuralist analyzer of folk tales, Vladimir Propp, treated the individual tale as the unit of analysis. The unitary mytheme, by contrast, is the equivalent in myth of the phonemes, morphemes, and sememes into which structural linguistics divides language, the smallest possible units of sound, structure, and meaning (respectively) within a language system.

In the 1950s, Claude Lévi-Strauss first adapted this technique of language analysis to analytic myth criticism. In his work on the myth systems of primitive tribes, working from the analogy of language structure, he adopted the French term mythème, with the assertion that the system of meaning within mythic utterances parallels closely that of a language system. Roman Jakobson varies this idea, treating mythemes as concepts or phonemes which have no significance in themselves but whose significance might be shown by sociological analysis.

Spanish literary critic José Manuel Losada defines the term mytheme as “the minimal thematic and mythological unit whose indispensable trascendent or supernatural dimension enables it to interact with other mythemes in the formation of myth” According to his theory of cultural myth criticism, a myth always consists of at least two mythemes that interact with each other in various ways to create the myth's unique "DNA". If two stories contain the same configurations of mythemes, they may be considered the same myth, but in different variations.

Philosophers such as Daniel Dennett have also used the term "mytheme".

Lev Manovich uses the terms seme and mytheme in his book The Language of New Media to describe aspects of culture with which computer images enter into dialogue.

== See also ==
- Archetype
- Meme
- Narreme
- Trope (literature)

== General and cited references ==
- Lévi-Strauss, Claude (1958). "La Structure des mythes". Anthropologie Structurale (in French). Paris: Plon. pp. 227–255. OCLC 753269.
