= The Devlins =

Irish alternative rock band

- Also known as: Devlins
- Origin: Dublin, Republic of Ireland; Newry, Northern Ireland
- Genres: Indie rock
- Years active: 1993–present
- Labels: Nettwerk; Rubyworks Records; Blue Élan Records
- Members: Colin Devlin; Peter Devlin; Guy Rickarby; Mark Murphy

The Devlins are an alternative rock band originating from Dublin, Republic of Ireland, although the eponymous Devlin brothers were born in Newry, County Down.

== History ==
The Devlins have released five albums to date. Their first album, Drift, received a four-star review in Rolling Stone. After several years where Colin Devlin developed a solo career, the Devlins did shows in Ireland in 2011 and released a new single, promising a new album in 2012; however, this album was never released. Colin Devlin has continued actively working as a solo musician. In 2024 the band released All The Days, their first album in twenty years.

== Soundtrack inclusions ==
"Waiting" was featured in remix form on the 2002 Six Feet Under soundtrack, but originally from their 1997 release Waiting; and "World Outside", was included in the 2004 drama Closer.

Their song "Crossing The River" is featured in the soundtrack of Batman Forever.

Their song "Montreal" was featured in an episode of Discovery Channel's Road Trip USA.

== Discography ==
=== The Devlins ===
- Drift (1993), single "I Knew That" 1994 video directed by Paul Boyd
- Waiting (1997)
- Consent (2002)
- Waves (2004)
- All The Days (2024)

=== Colin Devlin ===
Albums

- Democracy Of One (2009)
- The Killing Joke (instrumental soundtrack) (2013)
- High Point (2018)

Singles

- "Let The Great World Spin" (non-album single) (2012)
- "On New Year’s Day" (non-album single) (2015)
- "Time Rolls By" (track from the motion picture soundtrack, Jenny’s Wedding) (2015)
- "Love Is Blindness" (non-album single, a cover of the band U2’s song from Achtung Baby. The song features Randy Young, from the band Poco) (2021)
