= Six Feet Under (soundtrack) =

Soundtrack album by Various Artists
- Released: March 5, 2002
- Genres: Soundtrack, Adult Alternative, Rock
- Length: 1:08:54
- Label: Universal

Professional ratings
Review scores
Source	Rating
Allmusic	3.5/5 stars

Six Feet Under is a soundtrack album to the HBO television series Six Feet Under, released in 2002 on Universal Music.

== Track listing ==
No.	Title	Artist	Length
1.	"Six Feet Under Title Theme" (plays at the start of every episode)	Thomas Newman	1:36
2.	"Heaven" (plays in promotional trailers for the show and in "In the Game")	Lamb	4:58
3.	"Deep Down & Dirty"	Stereo MCs	4:22
4.	"I Love Being Here With You"	Peggy Lee	2:44
5.	"One Time Too Many"	P.J. Harvey	2:52
6.	"Squares"	The Beta Band	3:44
7.	"Distractions"	Zero 7	5:16
8.	"Inspiration Information"	Shuggie Otis	4:10
9.	"Pure & Easy"	The Dining Rooms	4:34
10.	"Let's Go Out Tonight"	Craig Armstrong featuring Paul Buchanan	6:02
11.	"Spooky"	Classics IV	2:50
12.	"Bohemian Like You"	The Dandy Warhols	3:28
13.	"Mis Dos Pequeñas"	Orlando Cachaito Lopez	4:04
14.	"Waiting" (Tom Lord-Alge remix; plays in the ending sequence of the pilot episode)	The Devlins	4:51
15.	"Six Feet Under Title Theme" (Rae & Christian remix; special bonus feature on DVD)	Thomas Newman	5:19
16.	"Six Feet Under Title Theme" (Photek remix; special bonus feature on DVD)	Thomas Newman	5:08
17.	"Yummy Yummy Yummy"	Julie London	2:56
