= Kawasaki Vulcan 1500 Drifter =

Motorcycle

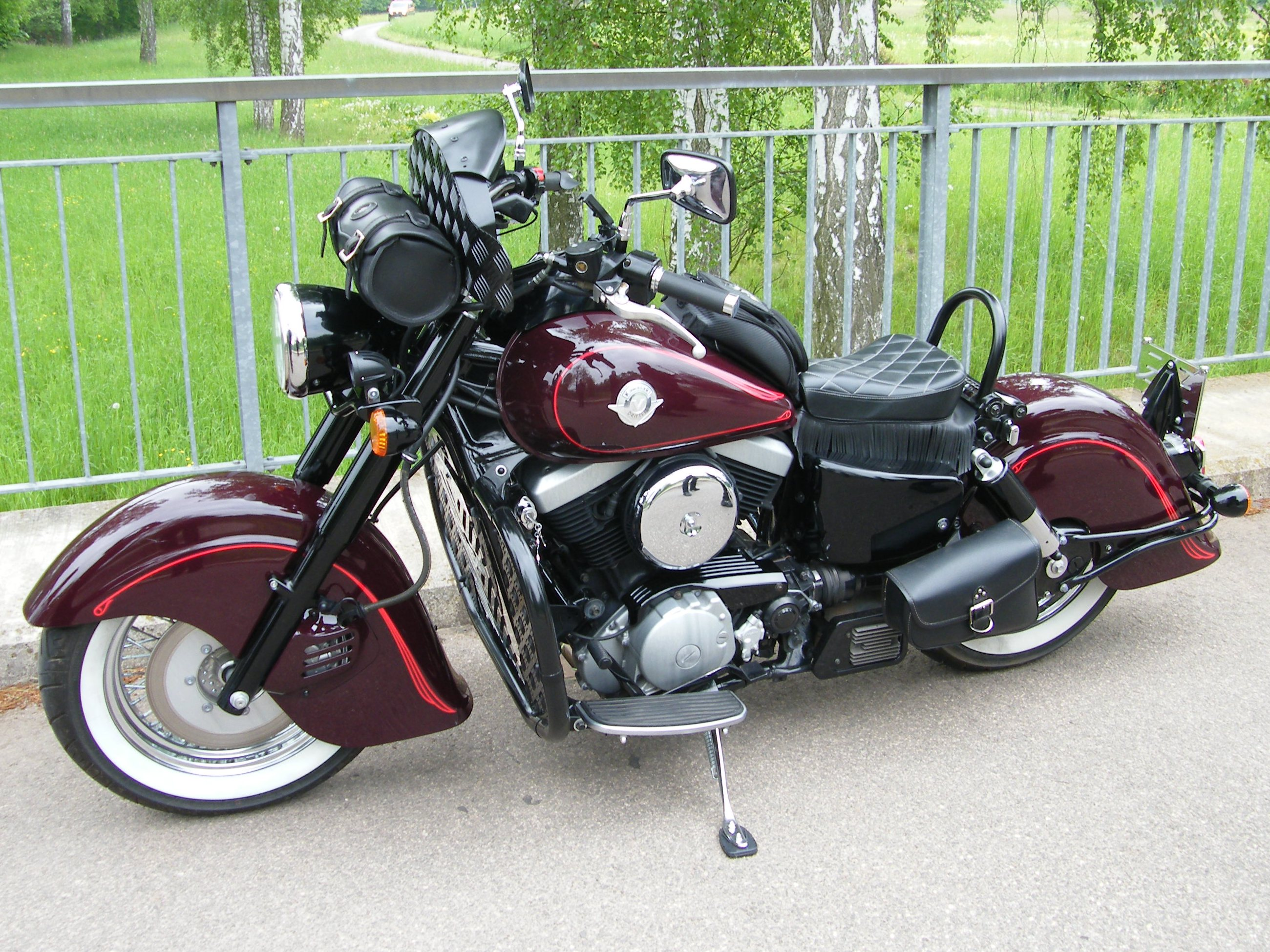
VN 1500 Drifter

The Kawasaki VN1500 Vulcan Drifter is a fuel-injected, shaft driven and water cooled, part of the Kawasaki Vulcan line of cruiser motorcycles created in the classic style lines of the 1940s Indian Chief. Kawasaki built this model between 1999 and 2005.

== Inspiration ==
The Drifter was the result of a discussion between Ken Boyko, Don Emde, son of Indian legend Floyd Emde and John Hoover of Kawasaki. Retro motorcycles were becoming the rage and the question was posed "What would a modern up-to-date Indian look like and what kind of technology would it have?" They enlisted Denny Berg of Time Machines Inc. to build such a machine. They gave him an early 1995 Classic and the drawing and turned him loose. The final result was a motorcycle called the "Super Chief", which was taken to several shows in 1996/97 and was such a hit with the riding public that Kawasaki took the Super Chief to Japan and put it into production. Due to patent law they couldn't use the Chief moniker and up until its release the name had not been settled on. The Drifters are intended to be a "tribute" to the 1948 Indian Chief and so closely resembles the Indian Chief of the late 1940s that the uninitiated mistake it for an "old" Indian. The Super Chief was featured in several motorcycle magazines.

An article in Rider magazine quoted the creators as saying that "the object of the exercise had been to marry classic Indian styling with contemporary technology in order to create a motorcycle which one might have expected Indian to manufacture had it still been in existence at the time the project was launched". In replicating the nostalgic look of the Indian, the front fender light, rear luggage rack, and leather fringe were deliberately omitted. Three years later, the team revisited this theme by creating a classic-styled police motorcycle.

== Production ==
The Kawasaki Vulcan Super Chief was eventually shipped to Japan, where it would inspire the creation and launch of the 1999 Kawasaki Vulcan 1500 Drifter, whose blacked out handlebar, frame, forks, and shock absorbers, as well as gray engine base, served to emulate the classic look. While the Super Chief's indicators had been located in the bike's headlights, the Drifter came equipped with conventional indicators. Kawasaki offered driving lights as accessories which could be added to the bike to enhance its appearance, while also serving a functional purpose.

The Drifter's retro look was achieved by using the Vulcan 1500 as a base from which to generate a streamlined design which would evoke a classic appearance while delivering the benefits of modern technology. Despite its 1940s appearance, the Drifter is powered by a fuel-injected liquid-cooled 1470 cc V-twin engine delivering power by a five-speed transmission featuring an automatic neutral finder. A drive shaft is used to transfer power from the engine and transmission to the rear wheel, and the motorcycle has single disc brakes both front and rear. The Drifter has a 1.66 metres (65 in) wheelbase, and weighed 322 kilograms (710 lb) dry.

In the 2000 model Kawasaki repeated the blacked out look, then in 2001 introduced a new look which included chromed forks and accessories, a larger fuel tank, and a modified seat consisting of stock solo seating as opposed to the two-up seat which had previously been standard issue.

== Response ==
The Drifter's design drew a positive response from reviewers who liked the Indian Chief's deeply valanced classic fender skirts as opposed to the more traditional motorcycle fender style. Rear air shock absorbers, original swingarm arrangement, and progressive front suspension made it a comfortable cruiser capable of covering great distances comfortably. Tire tubes were stock, as Kawasaki followed Cobra's lead and used chromed spoke wheels to complete the nostalgic look it was seeking to recreate.

== End of production ==
Shortly after the Gilroy Indian factory closed, Kawasaki withdrew the Drifter from the North American market.

Following the 2005 model release, the 1500 Drifter was retired from the Kawasaki stable. Its lighter-weight counterpart, the 800 Drifter, introduced in 1999 in Canada and Europe and marketed to the United States in 2000, remained in production for one more year before it too ceased production.
