= Kawasaki Vulcan 800 Drifter =

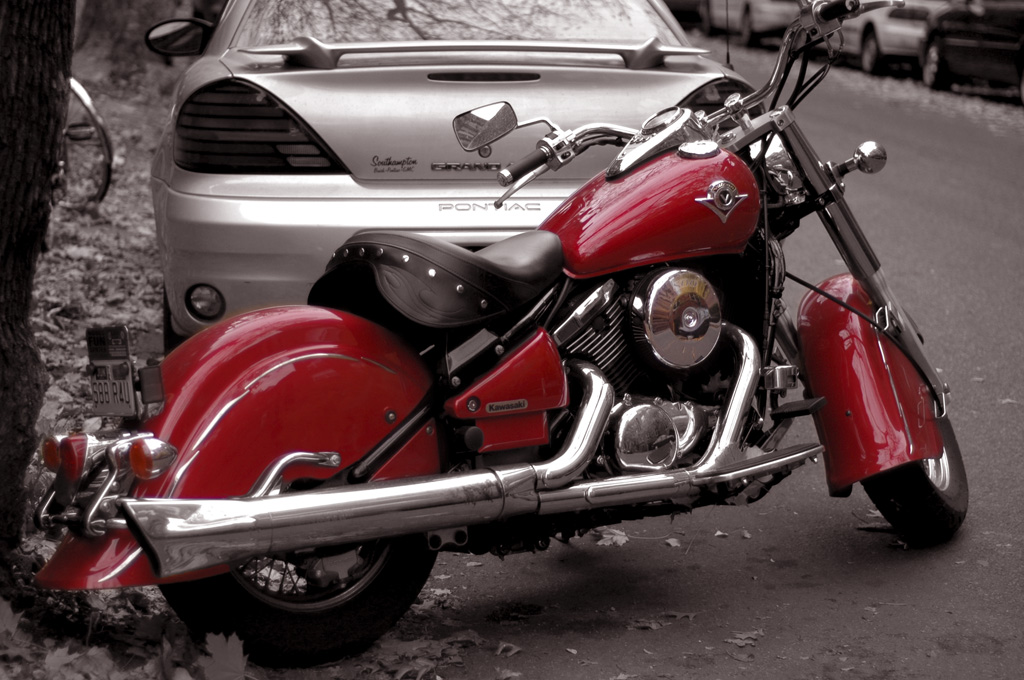
- Manufacturer: Kawasaki Motors
- Parent company: Kawasaki Heavy Industries
- Production: 2005-2006
- Engine: Four-stroke, SOHC, V-twin, 8 valves
- Bore / stroke: 88.0 x 66.2 mm
- Compression ratio: 9.5:1
- Ignition type: Digital with Kawasaki Throttle Responsive Ignition Control
- Transmission: 5 speed
- Tires: 130/90x16 (front); 140/90x16 (rear)
- Wheelbase: 1,615 mm
- Weight: 245.8 kg (dry)
- Related: 1500 Drifter

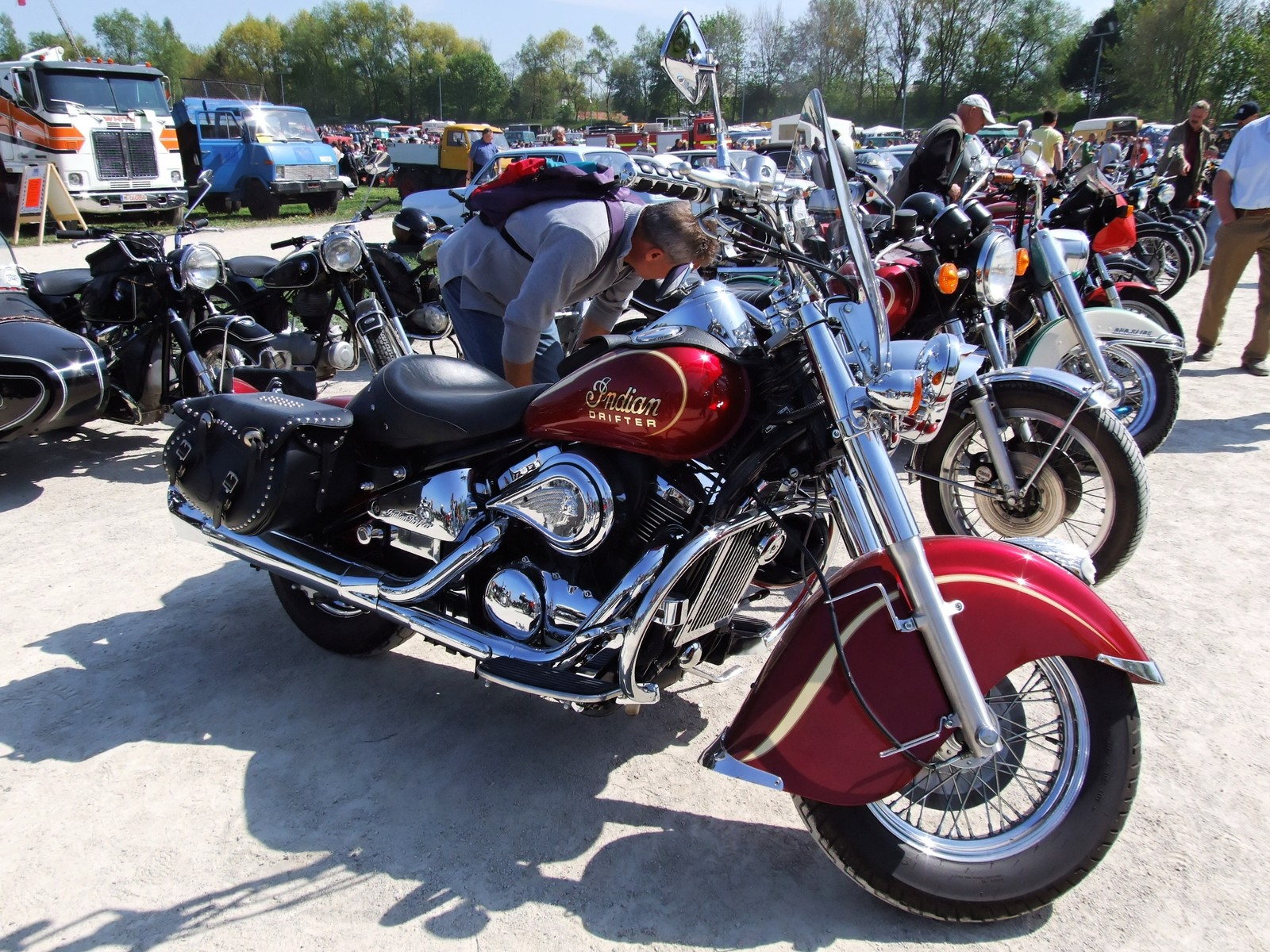
800 Drifter customized to look like an Indian motorcycle

The Kawasaki Vulcan 800 Drifter is a 1940s-styled cruiser loosely based on the lines of the c. 1940 Chief produced by the Indian Motocycle Manufacturing Company.

== Features ==
The Drifter VN800 is powered by a modern, carbureted, single overhead cam, single pin, liquid cooled 805 cc 55-degree V-twin engine. The twin cylinders have 'cooling fins', but they are almost entirely for show.

The Drifter has a hidden rear mono-shock to make it appear to be a hard-tail, akin to a Harley-Davidson Softail. The front and rear fenders cover about half of the respective wheel, and are the most striking visual cue.

== Discontinued ==
When Kawasaki revealed its 2007 models, the 800 Drifter no longer appeared in the Vulcan line-up.
