= Drift (The Devlins album) =

Studio album by the Devlins
- Released: 1993
- Label: Capitol
- Producers: Malcolm Burn, Robert Bell

The Devlins chronology
Drift (1993)	Waiting (1997)

Drift is the debut album by the Irish band the Devlins, released in 1993. It was delayed due to organizational changes at Capitol Records; a rerelease campaign also followed in 1994. The first single was "I Knew That". The band supported the album with a North American tour that included shows with Sarah McLachlan. Drift was a modest commercial success.

== Production ==
The album was produced primarily by Malcolm Burn; it was his second credited album production, and he was chosen in part due to his inexperience. Robert Bell worked on one of the tracks. Drift was recorded at the Devlins' home studio, Kingsway Studio, and AIR Studios. Although the band didn't think there was much of an "Irish quality" to the album, they were influenced by the sound of Van Morrison's Astral Weeks. Most of the album's songs were written by singer Colin Devlin. The title track is about feeling detached from people. "I Knew That" is about a failed romantic relationship.

== Critical reception ==
Professional ratings
Review scores
Source	Rating
AllMusic	4.5/5 stars
Chicago Tribune	1.5/4 stars
MusicHound Rock: The Essential Album Guide	3/5 stars

The Kitchener-Waterloo Record deemed the album "primarily acoustic music, of a folk-rock nature, and the Devlins' songs cohere nicely to the strengths of that genre ... the true strength here might well be lyrical rather than musical." Rolling Stone wrote that the band "capitalizes on singer-songwriter-guitarist Colin Devlin's precocious pop sensibility, opting for the lithe arrangements that allow the group ... to experiment with different textures while still giving the melodies room to breathe." Stereo Review opined that "the rhythm section, bassist Peter Devlin and drummer Sean Devitt, gives these tunes a crackling energy reminiscent of Mick Fleetwood and John McVie." The Chicago Tribune determined that the Devlin brothers "try too hard to be like U2 and INXS." The Times Colonist praised the "bright, pop sensibility, glorious sibling harmonies, and strong, surprisingly mature lyrics."

AllMusic wrote that "hushing vocals carry the entire 11-song set list and make Drift an ethereal beauty."

== Track listing ==
No.	Title	Length
1.	"I Knew That"
2.	"Every Time You Go"
3.	"Turn You 'Round"
4.	"Drift"
5.	"Almost Made You Smile"
6.	"Alone in the Dark"
7.	"Someone to Talk To"
8.	"Necessary Evil"
9.	"As Far as You Can Go"
10.	"I Don't Want to Be Like This"
11.	"Until the Light Shines Through"
