= Lynn Verlayne =

- Born: Lynn Verleyen; 1 January 1982 (age 43); Belgium
- Occupations: Singer-songwriter, record producer

Lynn Verlayne (born Verleyen) is a Belgian singer-songwriter/producer living in New York City, United States. She is the daughter of Belgian writer-journalist Frans Verleyen. Verlayne began her music career at the age of 19, when she moved from Belgium to New York City. She wrote her first album, Drifter, almost entirely on Columbia University's Medical School concert piano, which had been donated by Rachmaninoff, because she could not afford her own. Drifter was released on Belgium's Sony. Following Drifter, Verlayne released "Boom Boom" and "Peter Pan". She is signed to Round Hill Music Publishing.

In 2012, she co-wrote the album Nite People with DJ Buscemi, which peaked at number 7 on the Belgian chart. She writes and produces from her home studio in Brooklyn. Also in 2012, she began the Lynn Verlayne Studio, a music production and artist development/management company that represents several musicians.

== Discography ==
Year	Album	Ultratop
2010	Drifter	number 91

Year	Song	Chart #
2010	Peter Pan	
2010	Boom Boom	
