= The Drifter (album) =

Studio album by Marty Robbins
- Released: August 1966
- Genre: Country; western
- Length: 32:04
- Label: Columbia Records
- Producer: Don Law; Frank Jones

Marty Robbins chronology
What God Has Done (1966)	The Drifter (1966)	My Kind of Country (1967)

The Drifter is a studio album by country music singer Marty Robbins. It was released in 1966 by Columbia Records.

The album debuted on Billboard magazine's country album chart on September 3, 1966, peaked at No. 6, and remained on the chart for a total of 26 weeks. The album includes the hit single "Mr. Shorty" (No. 16) and the first of two sequels to "El Paso"—the eight-plus minute "Feleena (From El Paso)".

AllMusic gave the album a rating of four-and-a-half stars. Reviewer Stephen Thomas Erlewine called it "one of the purest cowboy albums Robbins ever made" and "one of Robbins' most artistically ambitious albums, as well as one of his most accomplished."

== Track listing ==
All songs written by Marty Robbins, except where noted.

Side A

1. "Meet Me Tonight in Laredo" (Mabel Cordle, Ronnie Robinson) – 3:23
2. "The Wind Goes" – 1:43
3. "Cry Stampede" (Bill D. Johnson) – 2:16
4. "Feleena (From El Paso)" – 8:17

Side B

1. "Never Tie Me Down" – 1:29
2. "Cottonwood Tree" (Bob Sykes) – 3:56
3. "Oh, Virginia" – 3:40
4. "Mr. Shorty" – 5:01
5. "Take Me Back to the Prairie" (Sykes) – 2:19
