= Pipe drift =

Concept in pipelines

In oil and gas tubular specifications, pipe drift refers to the process of verifying that a cylindrical mandrel of specified diameter can pass through the full length of casing or tubing, ensuring that the internal diameter meets the minimum clearance requirements defined in ISO 11960. Drift mandrels and procedures are defined in standards such as API 5CT and API RP 5A5.

Drifting is a process in which a cylindrical mandrel is passed through the length of a pipe to detect obstructions or deformations. It is performed both at the pipe mill and in the field to ensure that tools, pumps, smaller pipe, and other items can pass through the pipe.
