= Hyleme =

A hyleme (from the ancient Greek ὕλη hýlē "wood [in the sense of 'raw material'], substance, matter") is – analogous to terms such as morpheme, phoneme or mytheme – a "logically and linguistically standardised, minimal state- or action-bearing unit of a narrative variant". The term was coined in the context of transdisciplinary research groups on myth research at the University of Göttingen, the method being taken up by the myth researcher Udo Reinhardt and rewarded with the prize of the Peregrinus Foundation in 2023. Narrative material research (Stoffwissenschaft) itself is referred to as hylistics, which was primarily developed as a method for researching ancient myths, but can principally be applied to all genres of narrative material.

In distinction to the literary terms of event and motif, the use of which is primarily limited to literary texts, a hyleme is intended to describe a transmedial unit of narrative material that can be extracted from different media and is itself "not fixed to a particular medial design or individual language". "Hylemes cannot be postulated deductively, but can only be obtained inductively by extraction from individually available media. Just as phonemes and morphemes only become tangible in the form of certain individual phonemes and morphemes, hylemes are only tangible in their different media." The process of extracting a sequence of hylemes (hyleme sequence) from a specific medium is referred to as hyleme analysis.

A hyleme as a "minimal state- or action-bearing unit" of a narrative basically comprises a statement that consists of at least one subject and predicate, to which further (direct or indirect) objects and/or determinations can be added. Hylemes are always formulated in the active state, even if the logical agent is unknown: instead of "Prometheus is punished", the hyleme reads "Zeus punishes Prometheus" or "NN punishes Prometheus" (if the agent is unknown).

Hylemes include not only actions in the narrower sense, but also processes and statements about states and characteristics. Zgoll 2019 distinguishes between dynamic ("Zeus kills Erechtheus") and static hylemes ("Zeus is the king of the gods"). This division was revised in later publications in favour of a division into punctual and durative hylemes, the latter being divided into durative-constant (always applies: "Zeus is the son of Kronos. "), durative-initial (applies at the beginning of the plot, but not forever: "Zeus is unmarried") and durative-resultative hylemes (applies only in the course of the plot: "Zeus is the husband of Hera").

== Hyleme analysis ==
In a hyleme analysis, all the information of a given medium – e.g. a text – is reproduced in the standardised form of hylemes. A second step consists of reconstructing the chronological sequence of actions, which not necessarily has to correspond to the sequence of statements in a text, as well as any implicit hylemes that can inevitably be reconstructed.

=== Example ===
A mythical material in the concretion of a text can read as follows:

"When Chryse, the daughter of Pallas, was married to Dardanos, she brought with her as a dowry gifts from Athena, namely the sanctuaries of the great gods."

The following hylemes can be extracted from this statement:

- Chryse is the daughter of Pallas
- Athena gives Chryse the sanctuaries of the great gods
- Chryse brings the sanctuaries of the great gods to the wedding as a dowry
- Dardanos marries Chryse

Here, the first statement "Chryse is the daughter of Pallas" is a static or durative-constant hyleme, while the others are dynamic/punctual hylemes. In a further step, the implicit durative-resultative hylemes "Chryse and Dardanos are (now) married" and "Chyrse is (now) the wife of Dardanos"/"Dardanos is (now) the husband of Chryse" could also be reconstructed from the given hyleme sequence. The reconstruction of implicit hylemes, which logically follow from the given hyleme sequence but are not explicitly mentioned in the text, can promise further insights, but their scope must be weighed up depending on the individual case.

=== Use ===
Hyleme analysis is a methodological tool for extracting the material (i.e. the pure content) from a medium (e.g. a literary text or an image) and making it visible in a standardised way. This enables further investigations and insights, especially in the case of mythical hyleme sequences:

- Reconstruction of the logical sequence of events in a complexly formulated text
- Reconstruction of the events in a narrative that has only been narrated in extracts or fragments
- Comparison of different narrative materials (e.g. Greek Typhon and Hittite Illuyanka myths) or variants (e.g. Zeus' battle against Typhon in Hesiod and Apollodorus) or different media concretisations of the same material (e.g. epic Iliad and movie Troy)
- Recognising logical inconsistencies that can be indicators of stratification of a narrative (not: of a text!)
