= Plot drift =

Plot drift, or narrative drift, is a phenomenon in storytelling in which the plot of the story deviates from its apparent initial direction. The phenomenon can affect written works, although it is often more noticeable in performed media such as television shows or movies. Plot drift is generally (though not always) seen as contrary to good storytelling technique.

A sign of plot drift can be the increased introduction of new characters and settings near the end of a story.

Sometimes, a plot drift may be accidental when translating a traditionally oral story to written form. Oral storytelling is inconsistent and various regional, or even familial, differences can cause a plot to shift.

A contrary literary technique might include the apparent introduction of plot drift, only to later reveal a connection to the rest of the story. This idea is shown in the epic poem The Odyssey by Homer. Homer consistently interrupts the narrative to describe the history and story of newly introduced objects or locations before going back to the narrative.
