= José Manuel Losada =

Spanish literary critic

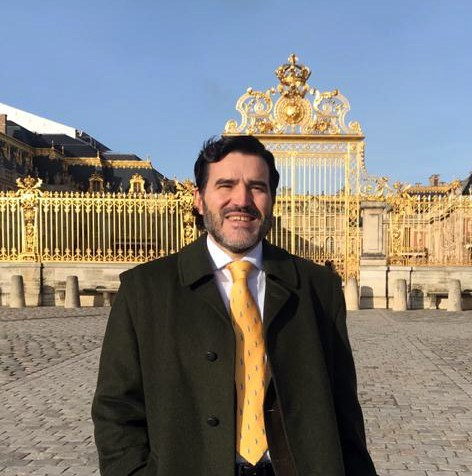
- Born: 31 May 1962 (age 64); Zamora, Spain
- Education: University of Valladolid; Paris-Sorbonne University
- Occupations: University professor, Literary theorist

José Manuel Losada (born 1962) is a Spanish literary theorist with a specialization in the fields of myth criticism and comparative literature. Within these fields he has published several books in Spanish, French and English.

== Academic career ==
José Manuel Losada holds a PhD from the Paris-Sorbonne University (1990) and a habilitation as Research Director (HDR) from Nancy 2 University (1999). He has been Assistant Professor at the University of Navarra, Visiting Scholar at Harvard University, Visiting Professor at the Université de Montréal, Visiting Scholar at the University of Oxford, Senior Fellow at St John's College (Oxford), Senior Fellow at Durham University (University College), and Visiting Professor at Sofia University (St. Kliment Ohridski). He has given research seminars at the Hebrew University of Jerusalem, the University of Montpellier, the University of Münster, LMU Munich, the University of Valencia, the University of Guadalajara (Mexico), Sofia University, Tunis University, the University of Iceland, and the National and Kapodistrian University of Athens. Since 2000, he has been a Professor at Complutense University of Madrid, where he teaches courses on French literature, comparative literature, and literature and religion.

J.M. Losada is the founder and editor of Amaltea, Journal of Myth Criticism (2008 –), an academic journal with a focus on analyzing the reception of ancient, medieval and modern myths in contemporary arts and literature. He is also founder and president of Asteria, International Association for Myth Criticism, a not-for-profit cultural association with an aim to promote research on myth in contemporary arts and literature. Furthermore, he is the founder and director of Acis, a myth criticism research group which brings together numerous academics and doctoral researchers with an interest in analyzing the contemporary relevance of myth from an interdisciplinary perspective. He is also the principal investigator in several R&D projects related to myth criticism. With the support of the members of these groups, Losada has coordinated many international conferences, outreach activities ("Mythological Walks" programmed in the Madrid Science Week), and international art competitions on the subject of myth.

His academic production includes some twenty books and over two hundred articles published in academic books and journals.

== Cultural Myth Criticism ==
Losada defines myth as "a functional, symbolic and thematic narrative of one or several extraordinary events with a transcendent, sacred and supernatural referent; which lacks, in principle, historical testimony; and which refers to an individual or collective, but always absolute, cosmogony or eschatology."

This syncretic, expansive concept of myth allows the critic to embark on innovative analysis and synthesis of mythical narratives and their diverse processes.

Myth criticism –a term coined by Gilbert Durand– is the study of myth; Losada's main contribution to literary theory is related to the updating of these studies into what he calls "Cultural Myth Criticism".

Cultural Myth Criticism places particular emphasis on the sacred, supernatural transcendence of myth. Losada states in numerous texts the differences between this transcendence and the transcendence that operates in other imaginary correlates (fantasy, science-fiction and esotericism). Losada also fully escapes from partial and distorting approaches to myth (manifestation of psychoanalytic complexes or social deformations: Freud, Barthes, etc.). There is myth only when two characters of a work of fiction, one from the sacred supernatural world, and the other from the natural world, establish contact. This interpretation (“the myth as an object”, the “value” in culture and textual interpretation), allows him to avoid reductive approaches to myth. Indeed, Losada considers that the indiscriminate application of a series of configuring factors of contemporary Western society (social and technical globalization, the “doxa” of democratic and consumerist relativism and the logic of vital and reflexive immanence) can mislead the critics who approach myth. Conscious and fond of today’s world, Losada proposes taking into account these factors as a benchmark and contrast for a truly academic study of myth. Without losing sight of previous approaches, this new myth criticism develops an epistemology that enables to comprehend and explain an imaginary and global reality, aimed at a greater understanding of the true message of myths for today’s culture. This discipline is the result of the main interpretation premises assumed by J.M. Losada:

1. Myth criticism requires a previous assumption of a definition of myth which can be applied to every specific instance (otherwise, the literary critic would be “playing with a marked deck”). Any myth is structured on a grid of mythemes (any mytheme has a transcendent valence).
2. Myth criticism requires the use of a correct terminology which distinguishes:
  1. Myth from other related tools: symbol, theme, archetype, prototype, hero, etc.
  2. Myth from other correlates of the imaginary: esotericism, fantasy, science fiction.
  3. Myth from pseudo-myth, i.e., mythicized historic characters or social and political sublimations.

== Main works ==
=== Books ===
- 1993: Tirso, Molière, Pouchkine, Lenau. Analyses et synthèses sur un mythe littéraire. Edited with Pierre Brunel, Paris, Klincksieck. ISBN 2252029390.
- 1997: Bibliography of the Myth of Don Juan in Literary History, José Manuel Losada ed. Lewiston, New York: Edwin Mellen Press. ISBN 0773484507.
- 1999: Bibliographie critique de la littérature espagnole en France au XVIIe siècle. Présence et influence, Geneva (Switzerland): Droz. ISBN 2600003134.
- 2010: Métamorphoses du roman français. Avatars d'un genre dévorateur, José Manuel Losada ed. Lovaina (Belgium): Peeters. ISBN 9789042922013.
- 2010: Mito y mundo contemporáneo. La recepción de los mitos antiguos, medievales y modernos en la literatura contemporánea. Bari (Italy): Levante Editori. ISBN 9788879495479.
- 2012: Myth and Subversion in the Contemporary Novel. Newcastle upon Tyne: Cambridge Scholars Publishing. Edited with Marta Guirao. ISBN 1443837466.
- 2013: Mito e interdisciplinariedad. Los mitos antiguos, medievales y modernos en la literatura y las artes contemporáneas. Bari (Italy): Levante Editori. Edited with Antonella Lipscomb. ISBN 9788879496230.
- 2014: Abordajes. Mitos y reflexiones sobre el mar. José Manuel Losada ed., Madrid: Instituto Español de Oceanografía. ISBN 9788495877512.
- 2014: Victor Hugo et l’Espagne. L’imaginaire hispanique dans l’œuvre poétique. In collaboration with André Labertit, Paris, Honoré Champion. ISBN 9782745326980.
- 2015: Myths in Crisis: The Crisis of Myth. Newcastle upon Tyne: Cambridge Scholars Publishing. Edited with Antonella Lipscomb. ISBN 9781443878142.
- 2015: Nuevas formas del mito, José Manuel Losada ed. Berlin: Logos Verlag. ISBN 9783832540401.
- 2016: Mitos de hoy. Ensayos de mitocrítica cultural, José Manuel Losada ed., Berlin, Logos Verlag. ISBN 9783832542399.
- 2017: Myth and Emotions, Newcastle upon Tyne: Cambridge Scholars Publishing. Edited with Antonella Lipscomb. ISBN 9781527500112.
- 2019: Myth and Audiovisual Creation, Berlín: Logos Verlag. Edited with Antonella Lipscomb. ISBN 9783832549664.
- 2021: Mito y ciencia ficción, Madrid: Sial Pigmalión. Edited with Antonella Lipscomb. ISBN 9788418888120.
- 2022: El Jardín de las Hespérides: del mito a la belleza, Madrid: Ediciones Complutense. Curator and Editor. ISBN 9788409368556.
- 2022: Mitocrítica cultural. Una definición del mito, Madrid: Akal. ISBN 9788446052678.
- 2024: Mito: teorías de un concepto controvertido, José Manuel Losada y Antonella Lipscomb (eds.), Madrid, Sial Pigmalión, 131 pp. ISBN 9788419928030.
- 2024: Mythical Narratives in Comparative European Literature / Le récit mythique dans la littérature européenne comparée, CompLit. Journal of European Literature, Arts and Society, Asun López-Varela y José Manuel Losada (dir.), 7, París, Classiques Garnier, 236 p. ISSN 2780-2523. ISBN 9782406169697.

=== Articles ===
- 1989. “Calderón de la Barca: El laurel de Apolo”. Revista de Literatura (Madrid), 51: 485–494. ISSN 0034-849X.
- 2004: "The Myth of the Fallen Angel. Its Theosophy in Scandinavian, English, and French Literature". Nonfictional Romantic Prose. Expanding Borders, Steven P. Sondrup & Virgil Nemoianu eds. Amsterdam / Philadelphia (PA): John Benjamins: 433–457. DOI: 10.1075/chlel.xviii.34los. ISBN 9027234515.
- 2008: “Victor Hugo et le mythe de Don Juan”, Don Juans insolites, Pierre Brunel ed. París : Presses de l’Université Paris-Sorbonne: 79–86. ISBN 9782840505679.
- 2009: “La nature mythique du Graal dans Le Conte du Graal de Chrétien de Troyes”. Cahiers de Civilisation Médiévale (Poitiers), 52,1 (2009): 3–20. ISSN 0007-9731.
- 2014: "Myth and Extraordinary Event". International Journal of Language and Literature. New York: pp. 31 – 55. Link
- 2015: “Myth and Origins: Men Want to Know”, Journal of Literature and Art Studies. New York, vol. 5, nº 10, pp. 930–945. ISSN 2159-5836 (print) ISSN 2159-5844 (online).
- 2016: “El mundo de la fantasía y el mundo del mito. Los cuentos de hadas”, Çédille, “Monografías”, 6: 69-100. ISSN 1699-4949. Link
- 2017: “El «mito» de Don Quijote (2ª parte): ¿con o sin comillas? En busca de criterios pertinentes del mito”, Cervantès, quatre siècles après: nouveaux objets, nouvelles approches, Emmanuel Marigno et al. eds., Binges (France): Éditions Orbis Tertius: 11–32. ISBN 9782367830957.
- 2018: “Le personnage mythique”, Degrés. Revue de synthèse à orientation sémiologique (Brussels), 45: c1-c18. ISSN 0770-8378.
- 2019: “Preface: The Myth of the Eternal Return”, Journal of Comparative Literature and Aesthetics, 40.2: 7-10. ISSN 0252-8169. Link
- 2020: “Mito y antropogonía en la literatura hispanoamericana: Hombres de maíz, de Miguel Ángel Asturias”, Rassegna iberistica (Venezia), 43, 113, Giugno (2020), 41–56. e-ISSN: 2037-6588. ISSN 0392-4777. Link
- 2020: “Cultural Myth Criticism and Today’s Challenges to Myth”, Explaining, Interpreting, and Theorizing Religion and Myth: Contributions in Honor of Robert A. Segal, Nickolas B. Roubekas and Thomas Ryba (eds.), Leiden, Koninklijke Brill NV, pp. 355–370. ISBN 9789004435025. Link
- 2021: “La trascendencia de la ciencia ficción”, Mito y ciencia ficción, José Manuel Losada & Antonella Lipscomb (eds.), Madrid, Grupo Editorial Sial Pigmalión, pp. 39–46. ISBN 9788418888120.
- 2024: “The Referential Function of Myth”, Mythical Narratives in Comparative European Literature, Paris, Classiques Garnier.
