= Drifter (2016 film) =

- Directed by: Chris von Hoffmann
- Written by: Chris von Hoffmann; Aria Emory
- Produced by: Chris von Hoffmann
- Starring: Aria Emory; Drew Harwood; Monique Rosario; Anthony Ficco; Rebecca Fraiser; James McCabe
- Cinematography: Tobias Deml
- Edited by: Chris Visser
- Music by: Nao Sato
- Production company: Green Star Films
- Distributed by: XLrator Media
- Release dates: October 19, 2016 (AU); February 24, 2017 (US)
- Running time: 86 minutes
- Country: United States
- Language: English

Drifter is a 2016 American post-apocalyptic thriller film directed by Chris von Hoffmann. It stars Aria Emory, who co-wrote the film with von Hoffmann, and Drew Harwood as brothers who become stranded in a town run by cannibals. It was released in October 2016 in Australia and February 2017 in the US. It has an approval rating of 42% at Rotten Tomatoes.

== Plot ==
While on the road, seeking vengeance for the murder of their father, brothers Miles and Dominic rob a store. The owner shoots Miles in the hand before they kill him. Dominic improvises a bandage for Miles, and they rest for the night in the desert. When Miles expresses doubt in their mission, Dominic angrily threatens to leave him to die in the desert. The brothers continue on after reconciling. While asleep in their car, Miles is surprised by several gunmen. After beating him, they announce that they intend to kill him and steal his car. Before they can, Dominic returns and kills all three despite Miles' pleas for the killing to end.

Miles and Dominic arrive at a small town, where they encounter an old man walking down the street. The man initially refuses to speak to them, but he seems willing to help once they offer him food. After he surprises them by puncturing one of the car's tires with a knife, Dominic begins beating him. A young woman, Vijah, stops him at gunpoint and ushers the two into her house, where she performs first aid on Miles. Vijah explains that the town's leader, Doyle, is dangerous, and they should all stay inside her house for their safety; Dominic ignores her warnings.

While exploring the ruins of the town, Dominic encounters Sasha, who seduces him. As they have sex, Sasha's boyfriend, Latos, appears. While Sasha holds Dominic at gunpoint, Latos grabs Miles and chastises Vijah for hiding the brothers from Doyle. Latos beats Dominic with a baseball bat but leaves the killing blow to Doyle. Latos forces Miles to watch as Doyle murders his brother. When Doyle later questions Miles in his office about why the brothers have trespassed in his territory, Miles refuses to cooperate, to Vijah's concern. Noticing this, Doyle and his gang taunt her. Doyle himself slashes one of her ears to teach her a lesson about loyalty.

Latos delivers food to Miles and says they are interested in having Miles join their gang. Latos explains Dominic was too obviously strong-willed and independent to be of use to them. When Miles is again uncooperative, Latos taunts him with the insinuation that the food is his brother's flesh. Vijah later visits Miles, and gives him a shard of glass. The two caress each other wordlessly, and he observes her scarred ear.

Doyle invites everyone to a dinner. Miles, finding Dominic's head on a platter, grows enraged as Doyle's gang noisily eats and taunts him. Miles draws the glass shard and stabs Sasha in the throat. Latos jumps on him and begins eating his face as Doyle impassively watches Sasha die. Vijah kills Latos, but another gang member takes her hostage. Doyle unceremoniously kills the gang member and takes Vijah hostage himself. Miles shoots Vijah in the gut; the bullet passes through her and kills both her and Doyle. After tenderly shutting her eyes, Miles points the gun at the old man encountered earlier, who has also been eating Dominic's flesh. As the man whimpers wordlessly, Miles lowers the gun and leaves.

== Cast ==
- Aria Emory as Miles
- Drew Harwood as Dominic
- Monique Rosario as Vijah
- Anthony Ficco as Latos
- Rebecca Fraiser as Sasha
- James McCabe as Doyle

== Production ==
Director and co-writer Chris von Hoffmann said he channeled his anger and frustration into the film, intentionally making it as nihilistic and mean-spirited as possible. His primary influence was The Proposition, though U Turn influenced the initial concept when he was still brainstorming ideas. This early concept involved two brothers who entered a haunted town, but the supernatural aspect was later dropped. von Hoffmann described the film as a "hybrid exploitation thriller that is basically a love letter, a deconstruction of genre movies in general".

Von Hoffmann and Aria Emory, the co-writer and star, met on the set of Behaving Badly and subsequently began developing Drifter. von Hoffmann said Emory was always intended to play the lead. The rest of the cast were not auditioned; instead, they came from people with whom von Hoffmann had previously worked or people with whom he wanted to work. Shooting took place in Southern California over the course of approximately 13 days.

== Release ==
Drifter was released in Australia before its United States premiere. In Australia, Accent Film Entertainment released the film on DVD October 19, 2016. XLrator Media gave Drifter a limited theatrical release in the US on February 24, 2017, and a video on demand release four days later.

== Reception ==
Rotten Tomatoes, a review aggregator, reports that 42% of 12 surveyed critics gave the film a positive review; the average rating is 5/10. Frank Scheck of The Hollywood Reporter wrote, "Despite the relentless violent mayhem, Drifter somehow commits the cardinal grindhouse movie sin of being deadly dull." Scheck described the film's plot as a "rip-off pretending to be homage". Matt Donato of Film Journal International called it "a cinematic collage assembled from better movies", criticizing the film for not having enough individuality to support the homages. In describing the film as "semi-successful", Noel Murray of the Los Angeles Times wrote, "Sometimes it's impressively funky and stylish, and sometimes tediously derivative." Murray concluded by praising the film's ambition and von Hoffmann's artistic voice. Writing for LA Weekly, Luke Y. Thompson called film's premise refreshing, as it recycles less-used aspects of the original Mad Max film. However, Thompson criticized the characters as unlikable, which he says makes their plight uninteresting. John Townsend of Starburst rated the film 8/10 stars and wrote, "While not necessarily a film you will revisit time and time again, Drifter is one you will certainly remember." Andrew Mack of Screen Anarchy wrote that the film "starts off promising enough" but becomes "terribly boring and bland" after the brothers arrive in the town. Mack said the cannibals behave logically by killing off Dominic, but this leaves the film without an interesting protagonist. Mack concluded von Hoffmann can create "visually stimulating films" once he works on better character arcs.
