= Hylistics =

Scientific study of narrative materials in context of myth research

Hylistics (from the ancient Greek ὕλη hýlē "wood [in the sense of 'raw material'], substance, matter") is the scientific study of narrative materials (Erzählstoffe). It defines itself as a transdisciplinary method of narrative material research, which is primarily used in the context of myth research. Closely associated with this is the concept of the hyleme.

The basis of hylistics is the distinction between a medium and the narrative material adapted in it. A material can be concretised in different media (e.g. text, image, oral tradition, film, dance or theatre play). The boundaries of the medium do not have to represent the boundaries of the narrative material - rather, a medium can encompass several materials (e.g. Ovid's Metamorphoses) or only outline or incompletely narrate a subject (e.g. an episode of the Trojan War in Homer's Iliad). With the help of hyleme analysis, a narrative material can be approximately extracted from a medium. The same material can be adapted in different ways in different media (e.g. the material of the Trojan War in the epic Iliad, the pseudo-historical Troy novel of Dictys or the movie Troy).

== History of Research ==
The method of hylistics was developed in the context of transdisciplinary research groups on myth research, especially in Ancient Near Eastern Studies and Classical Philology at the University of Göttingen. In 2019, the classical philologist Christian Zgoll published a fundamental work on hylistic method and myth theory as a habilitation thesis under the name Tractatus mythologicus; further anthologies and monographs followed in the Mythological Studies (MythoS) series. In 2023, Annette and Christian Zgoll were honoured with the Prize of the Peregrinus Foundation of the Academy of Sciences and Literature in Mainz for their "research on ancient mythological narratives and the development of an innovative methodology of comparative myth research". In his overall presentation of the hundred-year history of myth research, the classical philologist and myth researcher Udo Reinhardt mentions Zgoll's Tractatus mythologicus as "the latest handbook on myth theory" with "outstanding significance" for modern myth research.

== Hylemes and hyleme analysis ==
Main article: Hyleme (with explanation of hyleme analysis)

The central method of hylistics is hyleme analysis, in which the sequence of its smallest plot-carrying units - so-called hylemes - is reconstructed from the medial concretion of a narrative material. These are expressed in a standardised way as active statements consisting of subject, predicate and, if necessary, further objects and determinations. Hylemes are not to be equated with a text, but conceived as transmedial components of narrative material that can be extracted from materials of different medial concretion and are themselves "not fixed to a specific medial shape or individual language". Thus, hylemes can only offer an approximation of a narrative material as such. Hyleme analysis serves as a tool that (especially in the case of mythical hyleme sequences) enables further investigations and insights:

- Reconstruction of the logical sequence of events in a complex text
- Reconstruction of the events in a story that has only been told in extracts or fragments
- Comparison of different material (e.g. Greek Typhon and Hittite Illuyanka myth) or variants (e.g. Zeus' battle against Typhon in Hesiod and Apollodorus) or different medial concretions of the same material (e.g. epic Iliad and movie Troy)
- Recognising logical inconsistencies that can be indications of the stratification of a text or material (e.g. Bible text with several layers of editions), enabling to reconstruct competing or earlier variants of the material

== Hylistic myth definition and myth research ==
In principle, the hylistic method can be applied to various types of material, but it was developed and applied in particular to the study of mythical material. A myth - in contrast to other narrative materials such as fairy tales and legends - is defined in hylistics as "an Erzählstoff [narrative material] which is polymorphic through its variants and – depending on the variant – polystratic; an Erzählstoff in which transcending interpretations of what can be experienced form a hyleme sequence with an implicit claim to relevance for the interpretation and mastering of the human condition".

Accordingly, myths are characterised by several features:

- Myths always refer to objects of experience, i.e. the world as people know it from their own perception. For example, a myth can tell us where the sun comes from, but no myth ends with the fact that there are two suns in the sky. In regard to this aspect myth differ from fairy tales, which generally have no connection to the real world.
- The objects of experience are transcended by the myth, i.e. embedded in a metaphysical context of meaning with the participation of gods or comparable supernatural forces. Thus, myths often serve to explain the origin (etiology) of the world, people, things, creatures, places, customs or institutions, but also their moral valuation and hierarchy.
- Polymorphism refers to the existence of a narrative material in different variants that differ to a certain extent in terms of content. The same myth can be told in different sources not only in different detail or with differing details, but can even differ in supposedly central plot points (e.g. the variant of the Medeia myth told by Aelian, in which she does not kill her children). The myth itself is therefore not defined by individual details, but can only be described approximately on the basis of the unity of protagonists, settings and plot elements as a whole. There is no "standard version" of a myth as opposed to "deviating" variants, but at best more or less well-known and influential variants. Mythical materials often refer to each other, but do not form a consistent fictional universe.
- Polystraty refers to the construction of a single variant or concretion from components of different origin, e.g. from other myths or different variants of the same material. The juxtaposition of hylemes from originally different variants can lead to inconsistencies at the level of the text or the variant of the respective material, which can provide information about the stratification and development of the text or material. Since the personality of mythical figures is often polystrate and therefore inconsistent in itself (in contrast to novel characters created by a single author), the attempt to understand myths through the individual character traits and motives of the acting figures is fundamentally misguided ("psychological trap of myth interpretation").

Myths differ from the partly similar material types of legend and fairy tale primarily through the active intervention of gods. However, such distinguishing features are family resemblances that leave room for exceptions and overlaps (e.g. the appearance of God in fairy tales or Australian aboriginal dreamtime stories in which animals or humans take on the role of divine actors).

== Literature ==
- Reinhardt, Udo (2022). Hundert Jahre Forschungen zum antiken Mythos (1918/20–2018/20). Ein selektiver Überblick (Altertum – Rezeption – Narratologie) (= Mythological Studies 5). Berlin/Boston: Walter de Gruyter GmbH. pp. 325–322. ISBN 978-3-11-078634-7
- Zgoll, Annette; Cuperly, Bénédicte; Cöster-Gilbert, Annika (2023): In Search Of Dumuzi An Introduction to Hylistic Narratology. In Helle, Sophus and Konstantopoulos, Gina (eds.). The Shape of Stories: Narrative Structures in Cuneiform Literature (= Cuneiform Monographs 54). Leiden: Brill, pp. 285‒350. ISBN 978-90-04-53976-1
- Zgoll, Christian (2019). Tractatus mythologicus. Theorie und Methodik zur Erforschung von Mythen als Grundlegung einer allgemeinen, transmedialen und komparatistischen Stoffwissenschaft (= Mythological Studies 1). Berlin/Boston: Walter de Gruyter GmbH. ISBN 978-3-11-054119-9
- Zgoll, Christian (2020). Myths as Polymorphous and Polystratic Erzählstoffe. A Theoretical and Methodological Foundation. In Zgoll, Annette and Christian (eds.). Mythische Sphärenwechsel. Methodisch neue Zugänge zu antiken Mythen in Orient und Okzident (= Mythological Studies 2). Berlin/Boston: Walter de Gruyter GmbH. ISBN 978-3-11-065252-9
- Zgoll, Christian (2021). Grundlagen der hylistischen Mythosforschung. In Gabriel, Gösta Ingvar; Kärger, Brit; Zgoll, Annette and Christian (eds.). Was vom Himmel kommt. Stoffanalytische Zugänge zu antiken Mythen aus Mesopotamien, Ägypten, Griechenland und Rom (= Mythological Studies 4). Berlin/Boston: Walter de Gruyter GmbH. ISBN 978-3-11-074300-5
