= The Flight of the Wild Gander =

1969 book by Joseph Campbell

The Flight of the Wild Gander: Explorations in the Mythological Dimension
- Cover of the first edition
- Author: Joseph Campbell
- Language: English
- Series: Collected Works of Joseph Campbell
- Subject: Anthropology/Comparative Mythology
- Publisher: New World Library
- Publication date: First published in 1969. Second edition, 1990. Third edition 2002.
- Publication place: United States
- Media type: Print
- Pages: 192
- ISBN: 1-57731-210-4
- OCLC: 49249456
- Dewey Decimal: 291.1/3 21
- LC Class: BL304 .C35 2002

The Flight of the Wild Gander: Explorations in the Mythological Dimension is a 1969 book by mythologist Joseph Campbell, in which he collects a number of his early essays and forewords. Essays include "Bios and Mythos" (on the psycho-biological sources of mythic forms and symbols), "Mythogenesis" (on the rise and fall of a single Native American legend) and "The Symbol without Meaning" (about the secularization of myths in the modern age).

The wild gander of the title is a reference to the Hindu concept of the paramahamsa, a great spiritual teacher of exalted illumination, able to transcend the mundane, just as the hamsa is able to fly above the sky-scraping Himalayas.

Published originally in 1969 by Viking Press, the book was rereleased by Harper and Row in 1990. The third edition was published by New World Library in 2002, making The Flight of the Wild Gander the third title in the Joseph Campbell Foundation's Collected Works of Joseph Campbell series.
