= The Hero's Journey (disambiguation) =

In narratology and comparative mythology, the hero's journey or monomyth is a common template of stories that involve a hero who goes on an adventure, is victorious in a decisive crisis, and comes home changed or transformed.

The Hero's Journey may also refer to:

- The Hero's Journey (film), a film biography of Joseph Campbell who proposed such a narrative type
  - The Hero's Journey (book), a book produced to accompany the film
- The Hero's Journey, a transformative self-discovery process designed by Paul Rebillot on the basis of Joseph Campbell's work
- Hero's Journey (video game)
