= Historical Atlas of World Mythology =

Series of books by Joseph Campbell

- Vol. 1: The Way of the Animal Powers
- Author: Joseph Campbell
- Language: English
- Publisher: Alfred van der Marck, Harper and Row
- Publication date: First volume published in 1983; Volume 1, 2nd ed., 1988; Volume 2, 1989
- Publication place: United States
- Media type: Print (Hardback)
- ISBN: 978-0-912383-00-2
- OCLC: 9758940
- Dewey Decimal: 291.1/3 19
- LC Class: BL311 .C26 1983

The Historical Atlas of World Mythology is a multi-volume series of books by Joseph Campbell that traces developments in humankind's mythological symbols and stories from pre-history forward.

Campbell is perhaps best known as a comparativist who focused on universal themes and motifs in human culture. He first conceived of the Historical Atlas in the late 1970s as an extension of his works, The Mythic Image and The Masks of God. Like those books, the Historical Atlas of World Mythology intended to show the ways in which those universal themes and motifs were expressed differently by different cultures in different times and places.

Heavily illustrated and annotated, with numerous charts and maps to show both variations and similarities in different cultures' expressions of mythic themes, this series was intended to serve both academic and lay readers.

The Historical Atlas was left incomplete when Campbell died in 1987.

== Summary ==
This series was to build on Campbell's idea, first presented in The Hero with a Thousand Faces, that myth evolves over time through four stages:

- The Way of the Animal Powers—the myths of Paleolithic hunter-gatherers which focus on shamanism and animal totems. This volume was covered in two parts: Mythologies of the Primitive Hunter-Gatherers and Mythologies of the Great Hunt.
- The Way of the Seeded Earth—the myths of Neolithic, agrarian cultures which focus upon a mother goddess and associated fertility rites. This volume was to be covered in five parts, of which three were completed: The Sacrifice, Mythologies of the Primitive Planters: The Northern Americas, and Mythologies of the Primitive Planters: The Middle and Southern Americas. Two additional parts were planned: Mythologies of the Primitive Planters: Africa and South-western Asia and Mythologies of the Primitive Planters: Southern Asia.
- The Way of the Celestial Lights—the myths of Bronze Age city-states with pantheons of gods ruling from the heavens, led by a masculine god-king.
- The Way of Man—religion and philosophy as it developed after the Axial Age (c. 6th century BC), in which the mythic imagery of previous eras was made consciously metaphorical, reinterpreted as referring to psycho-spiritual, not literal-historical, matters. This transition is evidenced in the East by Buddhism, Vedanta, and philosophical Taoism; and in the West by the Mystery Cults, Platonism, Christianity and Gnosticism.

== Publishing history ==
Only the first volume was completed at the time of Campbell's death. Published by Alfred van der Marck editions as a single book in 1983, it was rereleased by Harper and Row in 1988, in the wake of Campbell's posthumous fame, brought by the airing of the television series, The Power of Myth. The first three parts of the second volume, which Campbell was working on literally to the day that he died, were completed by Campbell's long-time editor, Robert Walter, and published by Harper and Row in 1989. Both volumes are currently out of print.

Campbell left rough text for the last two parts of Way of the Seeded Earth, as well as notes for the final two volumes. The Joseph Campbell Foundation has expressed the intention to release the existing books, and, if possible, to complete Campbell's magnum opus.

== See also ==
- Comparative mythology
- Anthropology
- Ethnology
