= Robert Walter (editor) =

American book editor

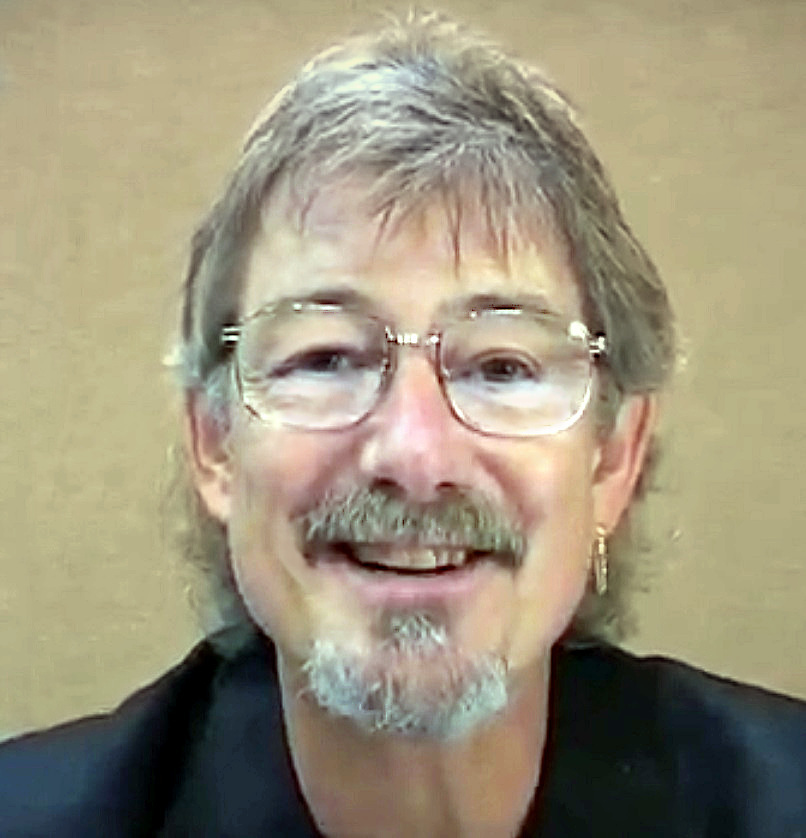
Walter in 2004

Robert Walter is an American editor and an executive with several not-for-profit organizations. Most notably, he is the executive director and board president of the Joseph Campbell Foundation (JCF), an organization that he helped found in 1990 with choreographer Jean Erdman, Joseph Campbell's widow.

In 1979, Walter was an editor with Alfred van der Marck Editions. He began to work on several projects with Campbell, who subsequently named him editorial director of his Historical Atlas of World Mythology.

Following Campbell's death in 1987, Walter served as literary executor of Campbell's estate, completing Volumes I and II of the Atlas and supervising its posthumous publication. With JCF publishing director David Kudler, he continues to oversee the publication of Campbell's oeuvre, including the video series Joseph Campbell's Mythos and the other works in the Collected Works of Joseph Campbell series, including the 2008 edition of The Hero with a Thousand Faces.

Prior to his work in publishing, Walter was a founding faculty fellow at the California Institute of the Arts; lectured widely on experiential education; and pursued a professional theater career, working for a decade as a director, production manager, and playwright. Bob was a founding trustee of United Religions Initiative and has served that organization as treasurer and as a member of its Global Council. He currently serves as the president of the elected board of trustees for the public Tamalpais Union High School District in Marin County, California; his term expires in 2015.
