= Thou Art That (book) =

2001 book by Joseph Campbell

Thou Art That: Transforming Religious Metaphor
- Author: Joseph Campbell
- Language: English
- Series: Collected Works of Joseph Campbell
- Subject: Religion/Comparative Mythology
- Publisher: New World Library
- Publication date: 2001-10-10
- Publication place: United States
- Media type: Print
- Pages: 192
- ISBN: 1-57731-202-3
- OCLC: 46969766
- Dewey Decimal: 230 21
- LC Class: BR115.L25 C36 2001

Thou Art That is a book by Joseph Campbell exploring the mythological underpinnings of the Judeo-Christian-Islamic tradition. It was edited posthumously from Campbell's lectures and unpublished writing by Eugene Kennedy.

Published by New World Library in 2001, Thou Art That was the first title in the Joseph Campbell Foundation's Collected Works of Joseph Campbell series.
