= The Inner Reaches of Outer Space =

1986 book by Joseph Campbell

The Inner Reaches of Outer Space: Myth as Metaphor and as Religion
- Cover of the first edition
- Author: Joseph Campbell
- Language: English
- Series: Collected Works of Joseph Campbell
- Subject: Religion/Comparative Mythology
- Publisher: Alfred van der Mark
- Publication date: First published in 1986. Second edition, 1988. Third edition 2002.
- Publication place: United States
- Media type: Print
- Pages: 160
- ISBN: 1-57731-209-0
- OCLC: 48144306
- Dewey Decimal: 291.1/3 21
- LC Class: BL311 .C263 2002

The Inner Reaches of Outer Space is a 1986 book by mythologist Joseph Campbell, the last book completed before his death in 1987. In it, he explores the intersections of art, psychology and religion, and discusses the ways in which new myths are born. In writing the book, Campbell drew on transcripts of a series of lectures and conversations that he gave in San Francisco between 1981 and 1984, including legendary symposiums with astronaut Rusty Schweickart and with members of the Grateful Dead.

Originally published by Alfred van der Mark in 1986, the book was rereleased by Harper & Row in 1988. With the publication of the third edition by New World Library in 2002, The Inner Reaches of Outer Space became the second title in the Joseph Campbell Foundation's Collected Works of Joseph Campbell series.
