= Stephen Larsen =

American psychologist

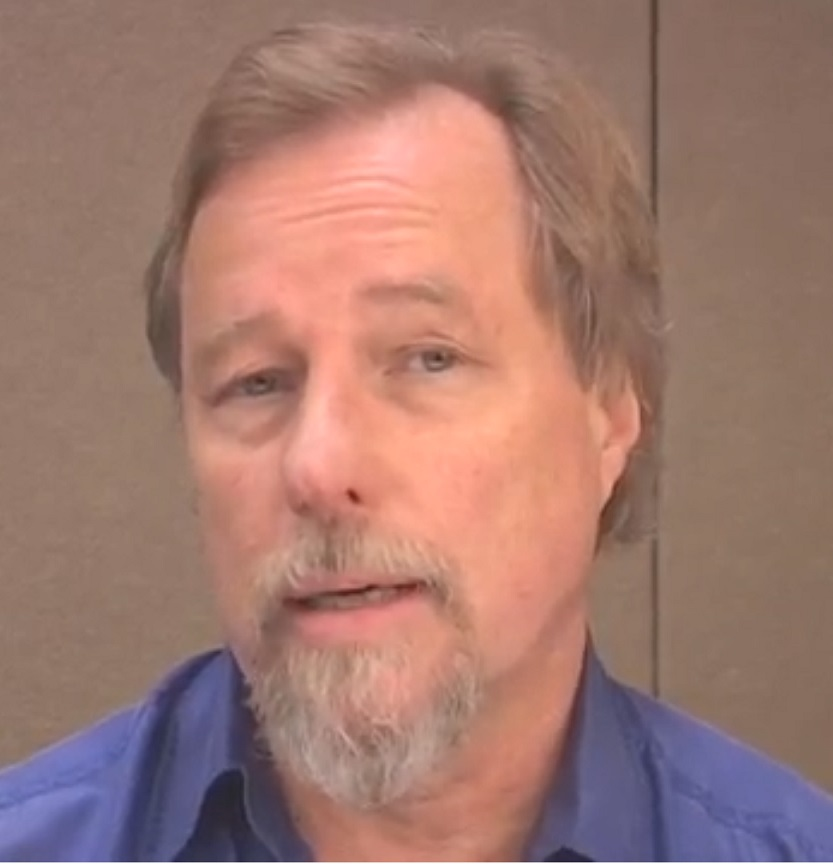
Stephen Larsen 2004

H. Stephen Larsen is a psychologist and author who, with his wife Robin Larsen, was on the founding board of advisors of the Joseph Campbell Foundation, and also founded the Center for Symbolic Studies, to carry on with the work of Joseph Campbell. He is best known for his work in mythology, and for being a pioneer in the field of neurofeedback.

== Background ==
Larsen is a graduate of Columbia University, (B.A., M.A.), and Union Institute & University (Ph.D.). He is professor emeritus of psychology with SUNY Ulster. He has trained with Edward Whitmont, M.D., Jungian training analyst, and Stanislav Grof, M.D., as well as Joseph Campbell, M.A. LL.D., in the understanding of myth and symbol. He has worked closely with Len Ochs, Ph.D., innovator/originator of the LENS neurofeedback technique, and researching its potential. In 2003, they jointly presented "Fundamentals of the LENS Method: Using EEG Driven Stimulation to Work with the Clinical Spectrum of Problems: Special Emphasis on the Neurologically Sensitive Patient" at the ISNR Conference in Houston.

== Bibliography ==
Larsen has written over forty other books, articles, and introductions.

- The Shaman's Doorway ISBN 0-89281-672-4
- The Mythic Imagination ISBN 0-89281-574-4 and ISBN 978-0-89281-574-6
- A Fire in the Mind: The Life of Joseph Campbell with Robin Larsen. Rochester, Vermont: Inner Traditions, 2002 ISBN 0-89281-873-5, ISBN 978-0-89281-873-0
- The Healing Power of Neurofeedback: The Revolutionary LENS Technique for Restoring Optimal Brain Function
- The Neurofeedback Solution: How to Treat Autism, ADHD, Anxiety, Brain Injury, Stroke, PTSD, and More Inner Traditions,2012

== See also ==
- Jonathan Young
- Credo Mutwa
