= Joseph Campbell =

American mythologist, writer, and lecturer (1904–1987)

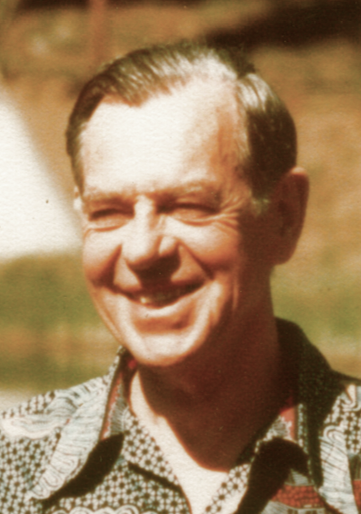
- Campbell in the late 1970s
- Born: Joseph John Campbell; March 26, 1904; White Plains, New York, U.S.
- Died: October 30, 1987 (aged 83); Honolulu, Hawaii, U.S.
- Spouse: Jean Erdman (m. 1938)

Academic background
- Education: Dartmouth College; Columbia University (BA, MA)
- Academic advisor: Roger Sherman Loomis
- Influences: Adolf Bastian; Friedrich Nietzsche; Karl Marx; Charles Darwin; Jiddu Krishnamurti; Oswald Spengler; James George Frazer; Sigmund Freud; Carl Jung; Heinrich Zimmer; James Joyce; Thomas Mann; Arthur Schopenhauer; Leo Frobenius; Rudolf Otto

Academic work
- Discipline: Literature
- Sub-discipline: Comparative mythology
- Institutions: Sarah Lawrence College
- Notable works: The Hero with a Thousand Faces (1949)
- Notable ideas: Monomyth
- Influenced: George Lucas; Alan Watts; Jim Morrison; Christopher Vogler; Dan Harmon; Keith Buckley; Buddy Nielsen; Chuck Palahniuk; Dave Carter

Joseph John Campbell (March 26, 1904 – October 30, 1987) was an American writer. He was a professor of literature at Sarah Lawrence College who worked in comparative mythology and comparative religion. His work covers many aspects of the human condition. Campbell's best-known work is his book The Hero with a Thousand Faces (1949), in which he discusses his theory of the journey of the archetypal hero shared by world mythologies, termed the monomyth.

Since the publication of The Hero with a Thousand Faces, Campbell's theories have been applied by a wide variety of modern writers and artists. His philosophy has been summarized by his own often repeated phrase: "Follow your bliss." He gained recognition in Hollywood when George Lucas credited Campbell's work as influencing his Star Wars saga.

== Life ==
=== Background ===
Joseph Campbell was born in White Plains, New York, on March 26, 1904, the elder son of hosiery importer and wholesaler Charles William Campbell, from Waltham, Massachusetts, and Josephine (née Lynch), from New York. Campbell was raised in an upper-middle-class Irish Catholic family; he related that his paternal grandfather Charles had been "a peasant" who came to Boston from County Mayo in Ireland, and became the gardener and caretaker at the Lyman Estate at Waltham, where his son Charles William Campbell grew up and became a successful salesman at a department store prior to establishing his hosiery business. During his childhood, he moved with his family to New Rochelle, New York. In 1919, a fire destroyed the family home in New Rochelle, killing his maternal grandmother and injuring his father, who tried to save her.

In 1921, Campbell graduated from the Canterbury School in New Milford, Connecticut and enrolled at Dartmouth College, where he joined Delta Tau Delta and for one year studied biology and mathematics. Preferring the humanities, the next year he transferred to Columbia University, where he received a Bachelor of Arts in English literature in 1925 and a Master of Arts in medieval literature in 1927. An accomplished athlete, he received awards in track and field events, and, for a time, was among the fastest half-mile runners in the world.

In 1924, Campbell traveled to Europe with his family. On the ship during his return trip he encountered the messiah-elect of the Theosophical Society, Jiddu Krishnamurti; they discussed Indian philosophy, sparking in Campbell an interest in Hindu and Indian thought. In 1927, he received a fellowship from Columbia University to study in Europe. Campbell studied Old French, Provençal, and Sanskrit at the University of Paris and the Ludwig-Maximilians-Universität München. He learned to read and speak French and German.

On his return to Columbia University in 1929, Campbell expressed a desire to pursue the study of Sanskrit and modern art in addition to medieval literature. Lacking faculty approval, Campbell withdrew from graduate studies. Later in life he jested that it is a sign of incompetence to have a PhD in the liberal arts, the discipline covering his work.

=== Great Depression ===
With the arrival of the Great Depression, Campbell spent the next five years (1929–1934) living in a rented shack in Woodstock, New York. There, he contemplated the next course of his life while engaged in intensive and rigorous independent study. He later said that he "would divide the day into four three-hour periods, of which I would be reading in three of the three-hour periods, and free one of them ... I would get nine hours of sheer reading done a day. And this went on for five years straight."

Campbell traveled to California for a year (1931–1932), continuing his independent studies and becoming a close friend of the budding writer John Steinbeck and his wife Carol. Campbell had met Carol's sister, Idell, on a Honolulu cruise and she introduced him to the Steinbecks. Campbell had an affair with Carol. On the Monterey Peninsula, Campbell, like John Steinbeck, fell under the spell of the marine biologist Ed Ricketts (the model for "Doc" in Steinbeck's novel Cannery Row as well as central characters in several other novels). Campbell lived for a while next door to Ricketts, participated in professional and social activities at his neighbor's, and accompanied him, along with Xenia and Sasha Kashevaroff, on a 1932 journey to Juneau, Alaska on the Grampus. Campbell began writing a novel centered on Ricketts as a hero but, unlike Steinbeck, did not complete his book.

Bruce Robison writes that

Campbell would refer to those days as a time when everything in his life was taking shape. ... Campbell, the great chronicler of the "hero's journey" in mythology, recognized patterns that paralleled his own thinking in one of Ricketts's unpublished philosophical essays. Echoes of Carl Jung, Robinson Jeffers and James Joyce can be found in the work of Steinbeck and Ricketts as well as Campbell.

Campbell continued his independent reading while teaching for a year in 1933 at the Canterbury School in Connecticut, during which time he also attempted to publish works of fiction. While teaching at the Canterbury School, Campbell sold his first short story Strictly Platonic to Liberty magazine.

=== Sarah Lawrence College ===
In 1934, Campbell accepted a position as professor of literature at Sarah Lawrence College in Yonkers, New York. In 1938, he married one of his former students, the dancer-choreographer Jean Erdman. For most of their 49 years of marriage they shared a two-room apartment in Greenwich Village in New York City. In the 1980s they also purchased an apartment in Honolulu and divided their time between the two cities. They did not have any children.

Early in World War II, Campbell attended a lecture by the Indologist Heinrich Zimmer; the two men became good friends. After Zimmer's death, Campbell was given the task of editing and posthumously publishing Zimmer's papers, which he would do over the following decade.

In 1955–1956, as the last volume of Zimmer's posthumous treatise, The Art of Indian Asia, Its Mythology and Transformations, was finally about to be published, Campbell took a sabbatical from Sarah Lawrence College and traveled, for the first time, to Asia. He spent six months in southern Asia (mostly India) and another six in East Asia (mostly Japan). This year had a profound influence on his thinking about Asian religion and myth, and also on the necessity for teaching comparative mythology to a larger, non-academic audience.

In a 1957 New York Times article, Campbell discussed some books by philosophy writer Alan Watts.

In 1972, Campbell retired from Sarah Lawrence College, after having taught there for 38 years.

=== Later life and death ===
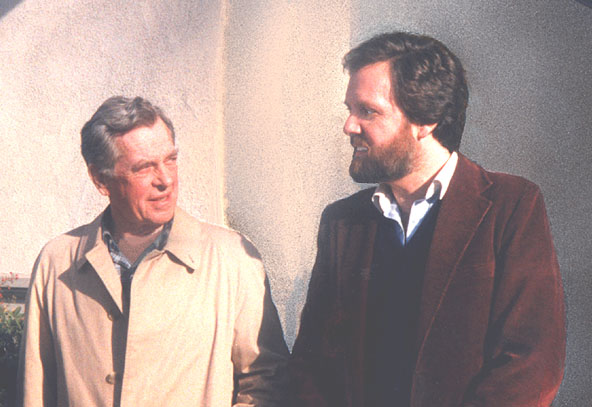
Joseph Campbell with Jonathan Young, 1985

Campbell attended a Grateful Dead concert in 1986, observing, "Everyone has just lost themselves in everybody else here!" With Grateful Dead, Campbell put on a conference called "Ritual and Rapture from Dionysus to the Grateful Dead".

Campbell died at his home in Honolulu, Hawaii, on October 30, 1987, from complications of esophageal cancer. Before his death he had completed filming the series of interviews with Bill Moyers that aired the following spring as The Power of Myth. He is buried in O'ahu Cemetery, Honolulu.

== Influences ==
=== Art, literature, philosophy ===
Campbell often referred to the work of modern writers James Joyce and Thomas Mann in his lectures and writings, as well as to the art of Pablo Picasso. He was introduced to their work during his stay as a graduate student in Paris. Campbell eventually corresponded with Mann.

The works of Arthur Schopenhauer and Friedrich Nietzsche had a profound effect on Campbell's thinking; he quoted their writing frequently.

The "follow your bliss" philosophy attributed to Campbell following the original broadcast of The Power of Myth (see below) derives from the Hindu Upanishads; however, Campbell was possibly also influenced by the 1922 Sinclair Lewis novel Babbitt. In The Power of Myth, Campbell quotes from the novel:

Campbell: Have you ever read Sinclair Lewis' Babbitt?
Moyers: Not in a long time.
Campbell: Remember the last line? "I've never done a thing I wanted to do in all my life." That's the man who never followed his bliss.

=== Psychology and anthropology ===
The anthropologist Leo Frobenius and his disciple Adolf Ellegard Jensen were important to Campbell's view of cultural history. Campbell was also influenced by the psychological work of Abraham Maslow and Stanislav Grof.

Campbell's ideas regarding myth and its relation to the human psyche are dependent in part on the pioneering work of Sigmund Freud, but in particular on the work of Jung, whose studies of human psychology greatly influenced Campbell. Campbell's conception of myth is closely related to the Jungian method of dream interpretation, which is heavily reliant on symbolic interpretation. Jung's insights into archetypes were heavily influenced by the Bardo Thodol (also known as The Tibetan Book of the Dead). In his book The Mythic Image, Campbell quotes Jung's statement about the Bardo Thodol, that it

belongs to that class of writings which not only are of interest to specialists in Mahayana Buddhism, but also, because of their deep humanity and still deeper insight into the secrets of the human psyche, make an especial appeal to the layman seeking to broaden his knowledge of life ... For years, ever since it was first published, the Bardo Thodol has been my constant companion, and to it I owe not only many stimulating ideas and discoveries, but also many fundamental insights.

== Comparative mythology and theories ==
=== Monomyth ===
Campbell's concept of monomyth (one myth) refers to the theory that sees all mythic narratives as variations of a single great story. The theory is based on the observation that a common pattern exists beneath the narrative elements of most great myths, regardless of their origin or time of creation. Campbell often referred to the ideas of Adolf Bastian and his distinction between what he called "folk" and "elementary" ideas, the latter referring to the prime matter of monomyth while the former to the multitude of local forms the myth takes in order to remain an up-to-date carrier of sacred meanings. The central pattern most studied by Campbell is often referred to as "the hero's journey" and was first described in The Hero with a Thousand Faces (1949). An enthusiast of novelist James Joyce, Campbell borrowed the term "monomyth" from Joyce's Finnegans Wake. Campbell also made heavy use of Carl Jung's theories on the structure of the human psyche, and he often used terms such as anima, animus and ego consciousness.

As a strong believer in the psychic unity of mankind and its poetic expression through mythology, Campbell made use of the concept to express the idea that the whole of the human race can be seen as engaged in the effort of making the world "transparent to transcendence" by showing that underneath the world of phenomena lies an eternal source which is constantly pouring its energies into this world of time, suffering, and ultimately death. To achieve this task one needs to speak about things that existed before and beyond words, a seemingly impossible task, the solution to which lies in the metaphors found in myths. These metaphors are statements that point beyond themselves into the transcendent. The Hero's Journey was the story of the man or woman who, through great suffering, reached an experience of the eternal source and returned with gifts powerful enough to set their society free.

As this story spread through space and evolved through time, it was broken down into various local forms (masks), depending on the social structures and environmental pressures that existed for the culture that interpreted it. The basic structure, however, has remained relatively unchanged and can be classified using the various stages of a hero's adventure through the story, stages such as the Call to Adventure, Receiving Supernatural Aid, Meeting with the Goddess/Atonement with the Father and Return. These stages, as well as the symbols one encounters throughout the story, provide the necessary metaphors to express the spiritual truths the story is trying to convey. Metaphors for Campbell, in contrast with similes which make use of the word like, pretend to a literal interpretation of what they are referring to, as in the sentence "Jesus is the Son of God" rather than "the relationship of man to God is like that of a son to a father".

In the 1987 documentary Joseph Campbell: A Hero's Journey, he explains God in terms of a metaphor:

God is a metaphor for a mystery that absolutely transcends all human categories of thought, even the categories of being and non-being. Those are categories of thought. I mean it's as simple as that. So it depends on how much you want to think about it. Whether it's doing you any good. Whether it is putting you in touch with the mystery that's the ground of your own being. If it isn't, well, it's a lie. So half the people in the world are religious people who think that their metaphors are facts. Those are what we call theists. The other half are people who know that the metaphors are not facts. And so, they're lies. Those are the atheists.

=== Functions of myth ===
Campbell often described mythology as having a fourfold function within human society. These appear at the end of his work The Masks of God: Creative Mythology, as well as various lectures.

The Mystical/Metaphysical Function
Awakening and maintaining in the individual a sense of awe and gratitude before the 'mystery of being' and his or her participation in it
According to Campbell, the absolute mystery of life, what he called transcendent reality, cannot be captured directly in words or images. Symbols and mythic metaphors on the other hand point outside themselves and into that reality. They are what Campbell called "being statements" and their enactment through ritual can give to the participant a sense of that ultimate mystery as an experience. "Mythological symbols touch and exhilarate centers of life beyond the reach of reason and coercion.... The first function of mythology is to reconcile waking consciousness to the mysterium tremendum et fascinans of this universe as it is."

The Cosmological Function
Explaining the shape of the universe
For pre-modern societies, myth also functioned as a proto-science, offering explanations for the physical phenomena that surrounded and affected their lives, such as the change of seasons and the life cycles of animals and plants.

The Sociological Function
Validate and support the existing social order
Ancient societies had to conform to an existing social order if they were to survive at all. This is because they evolved under "pressure" from necessities much more intense than the ones encountered in our modern world. Mythology confirmed that order and enforced it by reflecting it into the stories themselves, often describing how the order arrived from divine intervention. Campbell often referred to these "conformity" myths as the "Right Hand Path" to reflect the brain's left hemisphere's abilities for logic, order and linearity. Together with these myths however, he observed the existence of the "Left Hand Path", mythic patterns like the "Hero's Journey" which are revolutionary in character in that they demand from the individual a surpassing of social norms and sometimes even of morality.

The Pedagogical/Psychological Function
Guide the individual through the stages of life
As a person goes through life, many psychological challenges will be encountered. Myth may serve as a guide for successful passage through the stages of one's life.

=== Evolution of myth ===
Campbell's view of mythology was by no means static and his books describe in detail how mythologies evolved through time, reflecting the realities in which each society had to adjust. (Note: The schema laid out in the following text was one that Campbell explored in many of his works, including The Masks of God series; it was the explicit structure of his unfinished masterwork, Historical Atlas of World Mythology.) Various stages of cultural development have different yet identifiable mythological systems. In brief these are:

The Way of the Animal Powers
Hunting and gathering societies
At this stage of evolution, religion was animistic, as all of nature was seen as being infused with a spirit or divine presence. At center stage was the main hunting animal of that culture, whether the buffalo for Native Americans or the eland for South African tribes, and a large part of religion focused on dealing with the psychological tension that came from the reality of the necessity to kill versus the divinity of the animal. This was done by presenting the animals as springing from an eternal archetypal source and coming to this world as willing victims, with the understanding that their lives would be returned to the soil or to the Mother through a ritual of restoration. The act of slaughter then becomes a ritual where both parties, animal and mankind, are equal participants. In Mythos and The Power of Myth, Campbell recounts the story he calls "The Buffalo's Wife" as told by the Blackfoot tribe of North America. The story tells of a time when the buffalos stopped coming to the hunting plains, leaving the tribe to starve. The chief's daughter promises to marry the buffalo chief in return for their reappearance, but is eventually spared and taught the buffalo dance by the animals themselves, through which the spirits of their dead will return to their eternal life source. Indeed, Campbell taught that throughout history mankind has held a belief that all life comes from and returns to another dimension which transcends temporality, but which can be reached through ritual.

The Way of the Seeded Earth
Early agrarian societies
Beginning in the fertile grasslands of the Levant and the Fertile Crescent of Mesopotamia in the Bronze Age and moving to Europe, the practice of agriculture spread along with a new way of understanding mankind's relationship to the world. At this time the earth was seen as the Mother, and the myths focused around Her life-giving powers. The plant and cultivation cycle was mirrored in religious rituals which often included human sacrifice, symbolic or literal. The main figures of this system were a female Great Goddess, Mother Earth, and her ever-dying and ever-resurrected son/consort, a male God. At this time the focus was to participate in the repetitive rhythm the world moved in expressed as the four seasons, the birth and death of crops and the phases of the moon. At the center of this motion was the Mother Goddess from whom all life springs and to whom all life returns. This often gave Her a dual aspect as both mother and destroyer.

The Way of the Celestial Lights
The first high civilizations
As the first agricultural societies evolved into the high civilisations of Mesopotamia and Babylonia, the observation of the stars inspired them with the idea that life on earth must also follow a similar mathematically predetermined pattern in which individual beings are but mere participants in an eternal cosmic play. The king was symbolised by the Sun with the golden crown as its main metaphor, while his court were the orbiting planets. The Mother Goddess remained, but her powers were now fixed within the rigid framework of a clockwork universe.
However, two barbarian incursions changed that. As the Indo-European (Aryan) people descended from the north and the Semites swept up from the Arabian desert, they carried with them a male dominated mythology with a warrior god whose symbol was the thunder. As they conquered, mainly due to the superior technology of iron smithing, their mythology blended with and subjugated the previous system of the Earth Goddess. Many mythologies of the ancient world, such as those of Greece, India, and Persia, are a result of that fusion with gods retaining some of their original traits and character but now belonging to a single system. Figures such as Zeus and Indra are thunder gods who now interact with Demeter and Dionysus, whose ritual sacrifice and rebirth, bearing testament to his pre-Indo-European roots, were still enacted in classical Greece. But for the most part, the focus heavily shifted toward the masculine, with Zeus ascending the throne of the gods and Dionysus demoted to a mere demi-god.
This demotion was very profound in the case of the biblical imagery where the female elements were marginalized to an extreme. Campbell believed that Eve and the snake that tempted her were once fertility gods worshipped in their own right, with the tree of knowledge being the Tree of Life. He also found significance in the biblical story of Cain and Abel, with Cain being a farmer whose agrarian offering is not accepted by God, while herder Abel's animal sacrifice is. In the lecture series of Mythos, Campbell speaks of the Mysteries of Eleusis in Ancient Greece, where Demeter's journey in the underworld was enacted for young men and women of the time. There he observed that wheat was presented as the ultimate mystery with wine being a symbol of Dionysus, much like in the Christian mysteries where bread and wine are considered to incarnate the body and blood of Jesus. Both religions carry the same "seeded earth" cosmology in different forms while retaining an image of the ever-dying, ever-resurrected God.

The Way of Man
Medieval mythology, romantic love, and the birth of the modern spirit
Campbell recognized that the poetic form of courtly love, carried through medieval Europe by the traveling troubadours, contained a complete mythology in its own right. In The Power of Myth as well as the "Occidental Mythology" volume of The Masks of God, Campbell describes the emergence of a new kind of erotic experience as a "person to person" affair, in contrast with the purely physical definition given to Eros in the ancient world and the communal agape found in the Christian religion. An archetypal story of this kind is the legend of Tristan and Isolde which, apart from its mystical function, shows the transition from an arranged-marriage society as practiced in the Middle Ages and sanctified by the church, into the form of marriage by "falling in love" with another person that we recognize today. So what essentially started from a mythological theme has since become a social reality, mainly due to a change in perception brought about by a new mythology – and represents a central foundational manifestation of Campbell's overriding interpretive message, "Follow your bliss."
Campbell believed that in the modern world the function served by formal, traditional mythological systems has been taken on by individual creators such as artists and philosophers. (Note: This is the central thesis of the last volume of The Masks of God series, Creative Mythology.) In the works of some of his favorites, such as Thomas Mann, Pablo Picasso and James Joyce, he saw mythological themes that could serve the same life-giving purpose that mythology had once played. Accordingly, Campbell believed the religions of the world to be the various culturally influenced "masks" of the same fundamental, transcendent truths. All religions can bring one to an elevated awareness above and beyond a dualistic conception of reality, or idea of "pairs of opposites" such as being and non-being, or right and wrong. Indeed, he quotes from the Rigveda in the preface to The Hero with a Thousand Faces: "Truth is one, the sages speak of it by many names."

== Legacy ==
=== Joseph Campbell Foundation ===
In 1991, Campbell's longtime friend and editor, Robert Walter, and Campbell's widow, choreographer Jean Erdman, created the Joseph Campbell Foundation.

Initiatives undertaken by the JCF include: The Collected Works of Joseph Campbell, a series of books and recordings that aims to pull together Campbell's myriad-minded work; the Erdman Campbell Award; the Mythological RoundTables, a network of local groups around the globe that explore the subjects of comparative mythology, psychology, religion and culture; and the collection of Campbell's library and papers housed at the OPUS Archives and Research Center.

=== Film and television ===
George Lucas was the first filmmaker to credit Campbell's influence. Lucas stated, following the release of the first Star Wars film in 1977, that its story was shaped, in part, by ideas described in The Hero with a Thousand Faces and other works of Campbell's. The linkage between Star Wars and Campbell was further reinforced when later reprints of Campbell's book used the image of Luke Skywalker on the cover. Lucas discusses this influence at great length in the authorized biography of Joseph Campbell, A Fire in the Mind:

I came to the conclusion after American Graffiti that what's valuable for me is to set standards, not to show people the world the way it is... around the period of this realization… it came to me that there really was no modern use of mythology... The Western was possibly the last generically American fairy tale, telling us about our values. And once the Western disappeared, nothing has ever taken its place. In literature we were going off into science fiction… so that's when I started doing more strenuous research on fairy tales, folklore, and mythology, and I started reading Joe's books. Before that I hadn't read any of Joe's books… It was very eerie because in reading The Hero with a Thousand Faces I began to realize that my first draft of Star Wars was following classic motifs… So I modified my next draft according to what I'd been learning about classical motifs and made it a little bit more consistent... I went on to read The Masks of God and many other books.

It was not until after the completion of the original Star Wars trilogy in 1983, however, that Lucas met Campbell or heard any of his lectures. In 1984, Campbell gave a lecture at the Palace of Fine Arts in San Francisco, with Lucas in the audience, who was introduced through their mutual friend Barbara McClintock. A few years later, Lucas invited Campbell to watch the entire Star Wars trilogy at Skywalker Ranch, which Campbell called "real art". This meeting led to the filming of the 1988 documentary The Power of Myth at Skywalker Ranch. In his interviews with Bill Moyers, Campbell discusses the way in which Lucas used The Hero's Journey in the Star Wars films (IV, V, and VI) to re-invent the mythology for the contemporary viewer. Moyers and Lucas filmed an interview 12 years later in 1999 called the Mythology of Star Wars with George Lucas & Bill Moyers to further discuss the impact of Campbell's work on Lucas' films. In addition, the National Air and Space Museum of the Smithsonian Institution sponsored an exhibit during the late 1990s called Star Wars: The Magic of Myth, which discussed the ways in which Campbell's work shaped the Star Wars films.

Many filmmakers of the late twentieth and early twenty-first centuries have acknowledged the influence of Campbell's work on their own craft. Christopher Vogler, a Hollywood screenwriter, created a seven-page company memo based on Campbell's work, A Practical Guide to The Hero With a Thousand Faces, which led to the development of Disney's 1994 film The Lion King. Among films that many viewers have recognized as closely following the pattern of the monomyth are The Matrix series, the Batman series and the Indiana Jones series. Dan Harmon, the creator of the TV show Community and co-creator of the TV show Rick and Morty, often references Campbell as a major influence. According to him, he uses a "story circle" to formulate every story he writes, in a formulation of Campbell's work. A fictionalized version of Campbell appears in a sixth-season episode of Rick and Morty.

=== Popular literature ===
After the explosion of popularity brought on by the Star Wars films and The Power of Myth, creative artists in many media recognized the potential to use Campbell's theories to try to unlock human responses to narrative patterns. Novelists, songwriters, and video game designers have studied Campbell's work in order to better understand mythology—in particular, the monomyth—and its impact.

The novelist Richard Adams acknowledges a debt to Campbell's work and specifically to the concept of the monomyth. In his best known work, Watership Down, Adams uses extracts from The Hero with a Thousand Faces as chapter epigrams.

Dan Brown mentioned in a New York Times interview that Joseph Campbell's works, particularly The Power of Myth and The Hero with a Thousand Faces, inspired him to create the character of Robert Langdon.

=== "Follow your bliss" ===
One of Campbell's most identifiable, most quoted and arguably most misunderstood sayings was his maxim to "follow your bliss". He derived this idea from the Upanishads:

Now, I came to this idea of bliss because in Sanskrit, which is the great spiritual language of the world, there are three terms that represent the brink, the jumping-off place to the ocean of transcendence: Sat-Chit-Ananda. The word "Sat" means being. "Chit" means consciousness. "Ananda" means bliss or rapture. I thought, "I don't know whether my consciousness is proper consciousness or not; I don't know whether what I know of my being is my proper being or not; but I do know where my rapture is. So let me hang on to rapture, and that will bring me both my consciousness and my being." I think it worked.

He saw this not merely as a mantra, but as a helpful guide to the individual along the hero journey that each of us walks through life:

If you follow your bliss, you put yourself on a kind of track that has been there all the while, waiting for you, and the life that you ought to be living is the one you are living. Wherever you are – if you are following your bliss, you are enjoying that refreshment, that life within you, all the time.

Campbell began sharing this idea with students during his lectures in the 1970s. By the time that The Power of Myth was aired in 1988, six months following Campbell's death, "Follow your bliss" was a philosophy that resonated deeply with the American public – both religious and secular.

During his later years, when some students took him to be encouraging hedonism, Campbell is reported to have grumbled, "I should have said, 'Follow your blisters.'"

== Academic reception and criticism ==
Campbell's approach to myth, a genre of folklore, has been the subject of criticism from academic folklorists. American folklorist Barre Toelken says that few psychologists have taken the time to become familiar with the complexities of folklore, and that, historically, Jung-influenced psychologists and authors have tended to build complex theories around single versions of a tale that support a theory or a proposal. To illustrate his point, Toelken employs Clarissa Pinkola Estés's (1992) Women Who Run with the Wolves, citing its inaccurate representation of the folklore record, and Campbell's "monomyth" approach as another. Regarding Campbell, Toelken writes, "Campbell could construct a monomyth of the hero only by citing those stories that fit his preconceived mold, and leaving out equally valid stories… which did not fit the pattern". Toelken traces the influence of Campbell's monomyth theory into other then-contemporary popular works, such as Robert Bly's Iron John: A Book About Men (1990), which he says suffers from similar source selection bias.

Similarly, American folklorist Alan Dundes was highly critical of Campbell's approach to folklore and gave various examples of what he considers source bias in Campbell's theories. Designating him as a "non-expert, Dundes questions media representations of Campbell as an expert on the subject of myth in popular culture. Dundes writes, "Folklorists have had some success in publicising the results of our efforts in the past two centuries such that members of other disciplines have, after a minimum of reading, believe they are qualified to speak authoritatively of folkloristic matters. It seems that the world is full of self-proclaimed experts in folklore, and a few, such as Campbell, have been accepted as such by the general public (and public television, in the case of Campbell)". According to Dundes, "there is no single idea promulgated by amateurs that has done more harm to serious folklore study than the notion of archetype".

According to anthropologist Raymond Scupin, "Joseph Campbell's theories have not been well received in anthropology because of his overgeneralizations, as well as other problems."

American academic Robert S. Ellwood observes that The Masks of God series "impressed literate laity more than specialists"; he quotes Stephen P. Dunn as remarking that in Occidental Mythology Campbell "writes in a curiously archaic style – full of rhetorical questions, exclamations of wonder and delight, and expostulations directed at the reader, or perhaps at the author's other self – which is charming about a third of the time and rather annoying the rest." Ellwood says that "Campbell was not really a social scientist, and those in the latter camp could tell". He notes a concern about Campbell's "oversimplification of historical matters and tendency to make myth mean whatever he wanted it to mean".

Feminist critic Camille Paglia, writing in Sexual Personae (1990), expressed disagreement with Campbell's "negative critique of fifth-century Athens" in Occidental Mythology, arguing that Campbell missed the "visionary and exalted" androgyny in Greek statues of nude boys. Paglia has written that while Campbell is "a seminal figure for many American feminists", she loathes him for his "mawkishness and bad research." Paglia has called Campbell "mushy" and a "false teacher", and described his work as a "fanciful, showy mishmash".

Campbell's Sanskrit scholarship has also been questioned. Jeffrey Moussaieff Masson, a former Sanskrit professor at the University of Toronto, said that he once met Campbell, and that the two "hated each other at sight", commenting that, "When I met Campbell at a public gathering he was quoting Sanskrit verses. He had no clue as to what he was talking about; he had the most superficial knowledge of India but he could use it for his own aggrandizement. I remember thinking: this man is corrupt. I know that he was simply lying about his understanding". According to Richard Buchen, librarian of the Joseph Campbell Collection at the Pacifica Graduate Institute, Campbell could not translate Sanskrit well, but worked closely with three scholars who did.

Additionally, some writers have accused Campbell of antisemitism. In 1989, Tamar Frankiel noted in Tikkun magazine that Campbell referred to Judaism as the "Yahweh Cult" and that he spoke of Judaism in almost exclusively negative terms. (Note: Campbell generally rejected the literal interpretation of religion, which he found especially common in the West regarding the Judeo-Christian teachings he was raised with in the Catholic Church.) In a 1989 New York Review of Books article, Brendan Gill accused Campbell of both antisemitism and prejudice against Blacks; (Note: Gill's article resulted in a series of letters to the editor, some supporting the charge of antisemitism and others defending him.) however, according to Robert Ellwood, Gill relied on "scraps of evidence, largely anecdotal". In 1991, Jewish American author Jeffrey Masson also accused Campbell of "hidden anti-Semitism" and "fascination with conservative, semifascistic views". A 1992 article in Religion claims that Campbell privately expressed antisemitic views and that his "writings attest to his prejudice".

== Works ==
=== Early collaborations ===
The first published work that bore Campbell's name was Where the Two Came to Their Father (1943), an account of a Navajo ceremony that was performed by singer (medicine man) Jeff King and recorded by artist and ethnologist Maud Oakes, recounting the story of two young heroes who go to the hogan of their father, the Sun, and return with the power to destroy the monsters that are plaguing their people. Campbell provided a commentary. He would use this tale through the rest of his career to illustrate both the universal symbols and structures of human myths and the particulars ("folk ideas") of Native American stories.

As noted above, James Joyce was an important influence on Campbell. Campbell's first important book (with Henry Morton Robinson), A Skeleton Key to Finnegans Wake (1944), is a critical analysis of Joyce's final text Finnegans Wake. In addition, Campbell's seminal work, The Hero with a Thousand Faces (1949), discusses what Campbell called the monomyth – the cycle of the journey of the hero – a term that he borrowed directly from Joyce's Finnegans Wake.

=== The Hero with a Thousand Faces ===
From his days in college through the 1940s, Joseph Campbell turned his hand to writing fiction. In many of his later stories (published in the posthumous collection Mythic Imagination) he began to explore the mythological themes that he was discussing in his Sarah Lawrence classes. These ideas turned him eventually from fiction to non-fiction.

Originally titled How to Read a Myth, and based on the introductory class on mythology that he had been teaching at Sarah Lawrence College, The Hero with a Thousand Faces was published in 1949 as Campbell's first foray as a solo author; it established his name outside of scholarly circles and remains, arguably, his most influential work to this day. The book argues that hero stories such as Krishna, Buddha, Apollonius of Tyana, and Jesus all share a similar mythological basis. Not only did it introduce the concept of the hero's journey to popular thinking, but it also began to popularize the very idea of comparative mythology itself – the study of the human impulse to create stories and images that, though they are clothed in the motifs of a particular time and place, draw nonetheless on universal, eternal themes. Campbell asserted:

Wherever the poetry of myth is interpreted as biography, history, or science, it is killed. The living images become only remote facts of a distant time or sky. Furthermore, it is never difficult to demonstrate that as science and history, mythology is absurd. When a civilization begins to reinterpret its mythology in this way, the life goes out of it, temples become museums, and the link between the two perspectives becomes dissolved.

=== The Masks of God ===
Published between 1959 and 1968, Campbell's four-volume work The Masks of God covers mythology from around the world, from ancient to modern. Where The Hero with a Thousand Faces focused on the commonality of mythology (the "elementary ideas"), the Masks of God books focus upon historical and cultural variations the monomyth takes on (the "folk ideas"). Whereas The Hero with a Thousand Faces draws more from psychology, The Masks of God series draws more from anthropology and history, with volumes dedicated to Primitive Mythology, Oriental Mythology, Occidental Mythology, and Creative Mythology.

=== Historical Atlas of World Mythology ===
At the time of his death, Campbell was in the midst of working on a large-format, lavishly illustrated series titled Historical Atlas of World Mythology. This series was to build on Campbell's idea, first presented in The Hero with a Thousand Faces, that myth evolves over time through four stages:

- The Way of the Animal Powers – the myths of Paleolithic hunter-gatherers which focus on shamanism and animal totems.
- The Way of the Seeded Earth – the myths of Neolithic, agrarian cultures which focus upon a mother goddess and associated fertility rites.
- The Way of the Celestial Lights – the myths of Bronze Age city-states with pantheons of gods ruling from the heavens, led by a masculine god-king.
- The Way of Man – religion and philosophy as it developed after the Axial Age (c. 6th century BCE), in which the mythic imagery of previous eras was made consciously metaphorical, reinterpreted as referring to psycho-spiritual, not literal-historical, matters. This transition is evident in the East in Buddhism, Vedanta, and philosophical Taoism; and in the West in the Mystery cults, Platonism, Christianity and Gnosticism.

Only the first volume was completed at the time of Campbell's death. Campbell's editor Robert Walter completed the publication of the first three of five parts of the second volume after Campbell's death. The works are now out of print. As of 2014, Joseph Campbell Foundation is currently undertaking to create a new, ebook edition.

=== The Power of Myth ===
Campbell's widest popular recognition followed his collaboration with Bill Moyers on the PBS series The Power of Myth, which was first broadcast in 1988, the year following Campbell's death. The series discusses mythological, religious, and psychological archetypes. A book, The Power of Myth, containing expanded transcripts of their conversations, was released shortly after the original broadcast.

=== Collected Works ===
The Collected Works of Joseph Campbell series is a project initiated by the Joseph Campbell Foundation to release new, authoritative editions of Campbell's published and unpublished writing, as well as audio and video recordings of his lectures. Working with New World Library and Acorn Media UK, as well as publishing audio recordings and ebooks under its own banner, as of 2014 the project has produced over seventy-five titles. The series's executive editor is Robert Walter, and the managing editor is David Kudler.

=== Other books ===
- Where the Two Came to Their Father: A Navaho War Ceremonial (1943). With Jeff King and Maud Oakes, Old Dominion Foundation
- The Flight of the Wild Gander: Explorations in the Mythological Dimension (1968). Viking Press
- Myths to Live By (1972). Viking Press
- Erotic irony and mythic forms in the art of Thomas Mann. Robert Briggs Associates. 1973. ISBN 9780931191091.— monograph; later included in The Mythic Dimension
- The Mythic Image (1974). Princeton University Press
- The Inner Reaches of Outer Space: Metaphor As Myth and As Religion (1986). Alfred van der Marck Editions
- Transformations of Myth Through Time (1990). Harper and Row
- A Joseph Campbell Companion: Reflections on the Art of Living (1991). Editor Robert Walter, from material by Diane K. Osbon
- Mythic Worlds, Modern Words: On the Art of James Joyce (1993). Editor Edmund L. Epstein
- The Mythic Dimension: Selected Essays (1959–1987) (1993). Editor Anthony Van Couvering
- Baksheesh & Brahman: Indian Journals (1954–1955) (1995). Editors Robin/Stephen Larsen & Anthony Van Couvering
- Thou Art That: Transforming Religious Metaphor (2001). Editor Eugene Kennedy, New World Library ISBN 1-57731-202-3. First volume in the Collected Works of Joseph Campbell
- The Inner Reaches of Outer Space (2002)
- Sake & Satori: Asian Journals – Japan (2002). Editor David Kudler
- Myths of Light: Eastern Metaphors of the Eternal (2003). Editor David Kudler
- Pathways to Bliss: Mythology and Personal Transformation (2004). Editor David Kudler
- Mythic Imagination: Collected Short Fiction of Joseph Campbell ISBN 160868153X (2012)
- Goddesses: Mysteries of the Feminine Divine ISBN 1608681823 (2013). Editor Safron Rossi
- Romance of the Grail: The Magic and Mystery of Arthurian Myth (2015). Editor Evans Lansing Smith
- The Ecstasy of Being: Mythology and Dance (2017). Editor Nancy Allison
- Correspondence 1927–1987 (2019, 2020). Editors Dennis Patrick Slattery & Evans Lansing Smith

=== Interview books ===
- The Power of Myth (1988). with Bill Moyers and editor Betty Sue Flowers, Doubleday, hardcover: ISBN 0-385-24773-7
- An Open Life: Joseph Campbell in Conversation with Michael Toms (1989). Editors John Maher and Dennie Briggs, foreword by Jean Erdman Campbell. Larson Publications, Harper Perennial 1990 paperback: ISBN 0-06-097295-5
- This business of the gods: Interview with Fraser Boa (Unlicensed – 1989)
- The Hero's Journey: Joseph Campbell on His Life and Work (1990). Editor Phil Cousineau. Harper & Row 1991 paperback: ISBN 0-06-250171-2. Element Books 1999 hardcover: ISBN 1-86204-598-4. New World Library centennial edition with introduction by Phil Cousineau, foreword by executive editor Stuart L. Brown: ISBN 1-57731-404-2
- Myth and Meaning: Conversations on Mythology and Life (2023). Hardcover, New World Library, ISBN 978-1-60868-851-7

=== Audio recordings ===
- Mythology and the Individual
- The Power of Myth (with Bill Moyers) (1987)
- Transformation of Myth through Time Volume 1–3 (1989)
- The Hero with a Thousand Faces: The Cosmogonic Cycle (read by Ralph Blum; 1990)
- The Way of Art (1990–unlicensed)
- The Lost Teachings of Joseph Campbell Volume 1–9 (with Michael Toms; 1993)
- On the Wings of Art: Joseph Campbell; Joseph Campbell on the Art of James Joyce (1995)
- The Wisdom of Joseph Campbell (with Michael Toms; 1991)
- Audio Lecture Series:
  - Series I – lectures up to 1970
    - Volume 1: Mythology and the Individual
    - Volume 2: Inward Journey: East and West
    - Volume 3: The Eastern Way
    - Volume 4: Man and Myth
    - Volume 5: Myths and Masks of God
    - Volume 6: The Western Quest
  - Series II – lectures from 1970 to 1978
    - Volume 1: A Brief History of World Mythology
    - Volume 2: Mythological Perspectives
    - Volume 3: Christian Symbols and Ideas
    - Volume 4: Psychology and Asia Philosophies
    - Volume 5: Your Myth Today
    - Volume 6: Mythic Ideas and Modern Culture
  - Series III – lectures from 1983 to 1986
    - Volume 1: The Mythic Novels of James Joyce
- Myth and Metaphor in Society (with Jamake Highwater) (abridged; 2002)

=== Video recordings ===
- The Hero's Journey: A Biographical Portrait – This film, made shortly before his death in 1987, follows Campbell's personal quest – a pathless journey of questioning, discovery, and ultimately of joy in a life to which he said, "Yes."
- Sukhavati: A Mythic Journey – This film is a personal, transcendent, and perhaps spiritual portrait of Campbell.
- Mythos – This series comprises talks that Campbell himself believed summed up his views on "the one great story of mankind." It is essentially a repackaging of the lectures featured in Transformations of Myth Through Time.
- Psyche & Symbol (12-part telecourse, Bay Area Open College, 1976) (Note: Never released.)
- Transformations of Myth Through Time (1989)
- Joseph Campbell and the Power of Myth (1988)
- Myth and Metaphor in Society (with Jamake Highwater; 1993)

=== TV appearances ===
- Bill Moyers Journal: Joseph Campbell – Myths to Live By (Part One), April 17, 1981
- Bill Moyers Journal: Joseph Campbell – Myths to Live By (Part Two), April 24, 1981

=== Edited books ===
- Gupta, Mahendranath. The Gospel of Sri Ramakrishna (1942) (translation from Bengali by Swami Nikhilananda; Joseph Campbell and Margaret Woodrow Wilson, with translation assistants; foreword by Aldous Huxley)
- Myths and Symbols in Indian Art and Civilization. Heinrich Zimmer (1946)
- The King and the Corpse: Tales of the Soul's Conquest of Evil. Heinrich Zimmer (1948)
- Philosophies of India. Heinrich Zimmer (1951)
- The Portable Arabian Nights (1951)
- The Art of Indian Asia. Heinrich Zimmer (1955)
- Man and Time: Papers from the Eranos Yearbooks. Various authors (1954–1969)
- Man and Transformation: Papers from the Eranos Yearbooks. Various authors (1954–1969)
- The Mysteries: Papers from the Eranos Yearbooks. Various authors (1954–1969)
- The Mystic Vision: Papers from the Eranos Yearbooks. Various authors (1954–1969)
- Spirit and Nature: Papers from the Eranos Yearbooks. Various authors (1954–1969)
- Spiritual Disciplines: Papers from the Eranos Yearbooks. Various authors (1954–1969)
- Myths, Dreams, Religion. Various authors (1970)
- The Portable Jung. Carl Jung (1971)

== See also ==
- Aarne–Thompson classification systems
- Archetypal literary criticism
- The Golden Bough
- Polytheistic myth as psychology
- Vladimir Propp
- Religion and mythology
- Script analysis
- The Seven Basic Plots
