= Thou art that =

Thou Art That may refer to:

- Tat Tvam Asi, one of the Mahāvākyas, the 'Great Sayings' of the Upanishads
- Thou Art That (book), by Joseph Campbell, 2001
