= Myths to Live By =

1972 book by Joseph Campbell

- Cover of the first edition
- Author: Joseph Campbell
- Language: English
- Subject: Mythology
- Published: 1972 (Viking)
- Publication place: United States
- Pages: 287 (1973 Bantam edition)
- ISBN: 978-0140194616

Myths to Live By is a 1972 book, a collection of essays, originally given as lectures at the Cooper Union Forum, by mythologist Joseph Campbell between 1958 and 1971. The work has an introduction by Johnson E. Fairchild.

Myth has had a deep power on the inner, spiritual lives of human beings throughout the ages (including our own age) and this is the common theme running throughout all the essays in the collection. Campbell explains the differences between western and oriental myths and rites. He shows how fundamental universal thoughts are adapted to local requirements of legitimation. A typical form of adaptation of the hero is the American image of the lone rider who dispels evil.

== Publication history ==
- Viking Press, New York, 1972, ISBN 978-0-14-019461-6
- Paladin Press, London, 1985, ISBN 978-0-586-08528-8
- Bantam Books, New York, 1988, ISBN 978-0-553-27088-4
- Penguin Books, Australia, 1993, ISBN 978-0-14-019461-6
- Souvenir Press, London, 2000, ISBN 978-0-285-64731-2
- Joseph Campbell Foundation, 2011, (ebook) ISBN 978-1-61178-000-0
