= Jean Erdman =

American dancer and choreographer (1916–2020)

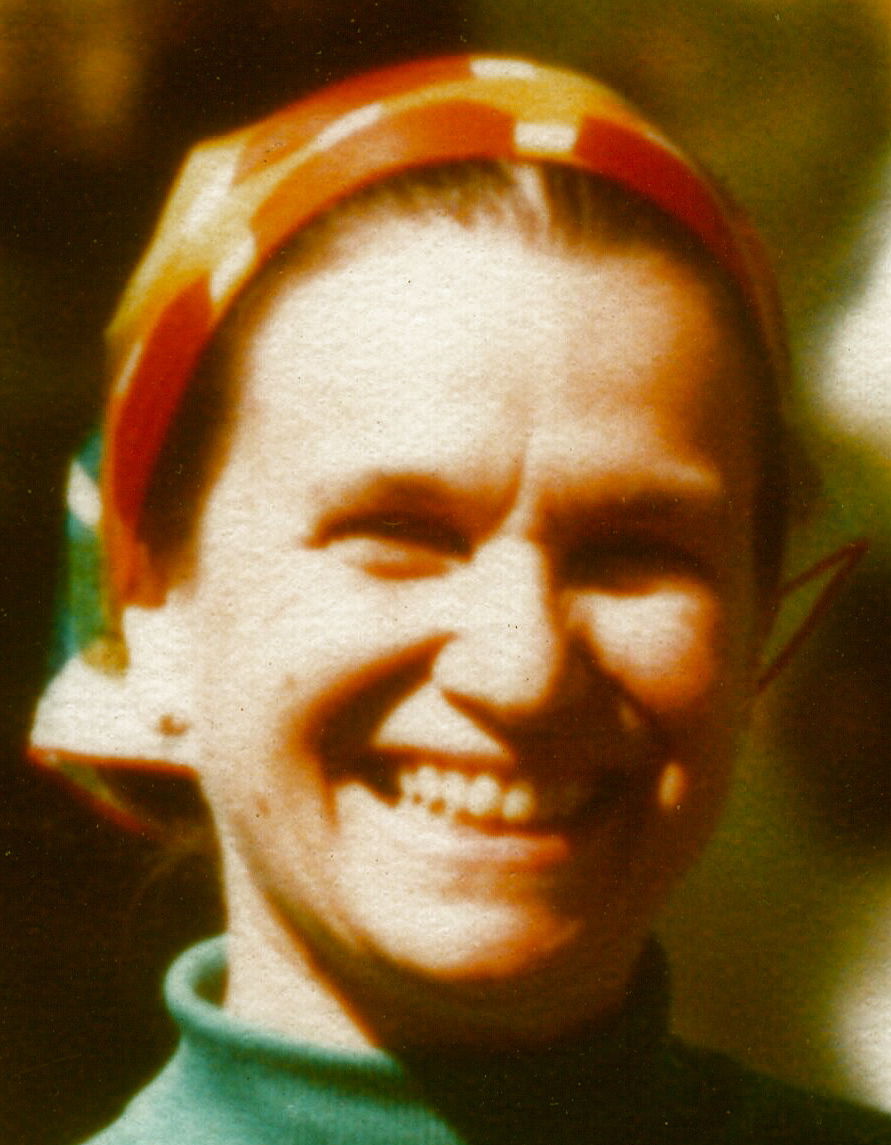
- Erdman in the late 1970s
- Born: February 20, 1916; Honolulu, Hawaii, U.S.
- Died: May 4, 2020 (aged 104); Honolulu, Hawaii, U.S.
- Occupations: choreographer; dancer; theatre director
- Spouse: Joseph Campbell (m. 1938; died 1987)
- Awards: Vernon Rice Outstanding Achievement in Theatre; 1963 The Coach with the Six Insides, Outstanding Choreography; 1972 The Two Gentlemen of Verona
- Website: jeanerdmandance.com

Jean Erdman (February 20, 1916 – May 4, 2020) was an American dancer and choreographer of modern dance as well as an avant-garde theater director, and the wife of Joseph Campbell.

== Biography ==
=== Early years and background ===
Erdman was born in Honolulu. Erdman's father, John Piney Erdman, a doctor of divinity and missionary from New England, settled in Honolulu as a minister at the non-denominational Protestant Church of the Crossroads where he preached, in both English and Japanese, to a multi-ethnic congregation. Her mother, Marion Dillingham Erdman, was a member of one of the founding industrialist families of Hawaii.

Erdman's earliest dance experience was the hula. She attended the Punahou School in Honolulu where she learned, as a form of physical education, Isadora Duncan interpretive dance. Reflecting on her early dance training Erdman said these two influences taught her that dancing is an "expression of something meaningful to the dancer, not a mere series of lively steps."

From Hawaii, Erdman went to Miss Hall's School for Girls in Pittsfield, Massachusetts, from which she graduated in 1934. She was troubled by the attitude towards dancing that caused her to be disciplined for teaching the hula to her classmates. Later, at Sarah Lawrence College, which she attended from 1934 to 1937, she was able to explore more freely her multiple interests in theater, dance, and aesthetic philosophy.

At Sarah Lawrence she encountered her two greatest influences: Joseph Campbell and Martha Graham. Campbell, a professor of comparative literature who later became an authority on mythology, was her tutorial advisor. This began a dialogue about the process of individual psycho-spiritual transformation and the nature of art that was to continue throughout their lives. Erdman was also interested in the modern dance technique she learned in Martha Graham's classes at Sarah Lawrence and at the Bennington College Summer School of Dance that she attended during the summers of 1935–1944.

In 1937 Erdman joined her parents and younger sister on a trip around the world during which she saw the traditional dance and theater of many countries including Bali, Java and India. Speaking of her experiences on this trip and of her later study of world dance cultures inspired by it Erdman said, "by studying and analyzing the traditional dance styles of the world, I discovered that the particular dance of each culture is the perfect expression of that culture's world view and is achieved by deliberate choices drawn from the unlimited possibilities of movement". Shortly after Erdman returned to New York, she married Campbell on May 5, 1938, and following a brief honeymoon began rehearsal as a member of the Martha Graham Dance Company.

=== Career ===
Erdman distinguished herself as a principal dancer in Graham's company in solo roles such as the Ideal Spectator in Every Soul is a Circus, the Speaking Fate in Punch and the Judy and the One Who Speaks in Letter to the World, Graham's ode to the American poet, Emily Dickinson. Dance critic Margaret Lloyd of The Christian Science Monitor praised the "felicitous humor" Erdman brought to her role as the Speaking Fate and called her "irreplaceable" in the 1941 revival of Letter to the World.

Working with Graham, Erdman had re-shaped the role, originally played by actress Margaret Meredith, from that of a static seated figure to a moving, integrated element in the groundbreaking dance-theater work. In The Complete Guide to Modern Dance, historian Don McDonagh writes of the "profound effect" that these speaking roles had on Erdman. He attributes her many explorations of the dynamic between word and movement to these early experiences.

As all female Graham dancers of the period Erdman was required to study choreography with Louis Horst, Graham's musical director. Horst presented lecture-demonstrations on his principles in pre-classic dance forms, and his students demonstrated his ideas through their own compositions. Her first solo, The Transformations of Medusa, which premiered at the Bennington College's Summer Festival of the Arts in 1942, began as an assignment for his class. The final version, with a commissioned score by Horst, remained in her repertory through the 1990s. Erdman's performance of this dance was the subject of Maya Deren's unfinished 1949 film, Medusa.

Originally an exploration of primitive style or archaic style, The Transformations of Medusa developed from a short study of the two-dimensional form into a complete dance of three sections. Erdman described the year long evolution of the piece as the process through which she came to understand that every posture contains "a whole state of being or attitude toward life." The dance evolved as she attuned herself to the physical sensations of the stylized positions and followed where they led her. It was Campbell, informed by his deep well of mythological imagery, who identified the dance character in the first short study as Medusa, the beautiful Greek priestess of Athena who became the hideous snake-headed gorgon. Erdman developed the second and third sections following the development of the mythological archetype.

In 1943, at the urging of Campbell and composer, John Cage, Erdman and fellow Graham Company member, Merce Cunningham, presented a joint concert sponsored by the Arts Club of Chicago. Cunningham's solos included "Totem Ancestor", "In the Name of the Holocaust", and "Shimmera", all with scores by Cage.

The two collaborative duets were, "Credo in US", a dramatic dance with a text by Cunningham and a commissioned score by Cage, and "Ad Lib" with a commissioned score by Gregory Tucker. According to Erdman, Ad Lib "was considered rather shocking because it incorporated improvisations. At that time it was not considered acceptable to perform improvs in public. That was for the privacy of your studio."

Erdman's other important works of the 1940s were Daughters of the Lonesome Isle (1945) and Ophelia (1946) with commissioned scores by John Cage on prepared and standard piano respectively, Passage (1946), Hamadryad (1948) to Debussy's "Syrinx", The Perilous Chapel (1949), and Solstice (1950), both with commissioned scores by Lou Harrison. Of The Perilous Chapel which featured a moving sculptural set by Carlus Dyer and was selected as one of the Best New Works of the Season by Dance Magazine, Doris Hering wrote, "When the dance was over one realized that by means of purely physical and visual elements, Miss Erdman had succeeded in giving a moving picture of the experience of an artist through phases of isolation and realization."

Other dance critics of the time noted her unique approach to dance making. New York Times dance critic John Martin remarked, "that Erdman's movement is perhaps as near to being non-associative as movement can be, yet it is freely creative. The method of composition, though naturally without story content, avoids any connotation of being merely decorative, much as non-objective painting avoids it, and manages to be just as strongly evocative."

Reporting on a group concert at the 92nd St YM/YWHA in which Erdman participated Edwin Denby wrote in the New York Herald Tribune, "Miss Erdman's (approach) is a more original and refreshing one to encounter. There was a lightness in the rhythm, a quality of generosity and spaciousness in the movement that struck me as a dance should, as a poetic presence." Walter Terry also writing for the Tribune commented, "(Her dance) attracts through rare beauty of pattern, through gently shaded dynamics and through that intangible essence we call quality. It does not appeal directly to the intellect nor to the emotions, but rather it seems to carry its message on its own short-wave system to the senses themselves."

From 1950 to 1954, she toured the US annually with her company. From 1954 to 1955 she toured India and Japan as a solo artist, the first dancer to do so since World War II. The report she filed with U.S. State Department helped initiate cultural exchange programs with India and many countries in the Far East.

From 1955 to 1960, she toured extensively as a solo artist throughout the U.S. Notable works from her repertory of that period include Portrait of a Lady created to jazz recordings that were layered by John Cage into his eight-track commissioned score, Dawn Song, a lyrical solo with commissioned score by Alan Hovhaness, Fearful Symmetry (1956; an allegory in six visions inspired by William Blake's poem, "The Tyger") to Ezra Laderman's Sonata for Violoncello, in which Erdman emerged from and interacted with a metal sculpture by Carlus Dyer, and Four Portraits from Duke Ellington's "Shakespeare Album" (1958), a suite of comic portrayals of Shakespearean heroines. Jean Erdman in libraries (WorldCat catalog)

In 1960, Erdman reorganized and renamed her dance company to reflect her explorations of the inter-relationship of movement, music, visual arts and spoken text. As noted above this interest began much earlier for Erdman. As early as 1946, John Martin noted, "She is keenly alert to modern experiments in the other arts music, poetry, visual design and employs them freely."

Her musical collaborations with composer Ezra Laderman which had begun in 1956 with Duet for Flute and Dancer, inspired by Erdman's interpretation of Debussy's solo flute composition Syrinx in her 1948 solo Hamadryad and culminating in the 1957 group work Harlequinade, featuring dancer Donald McKayle, were the subject of a feature story in Time magazine in April 1957.

In the theater Erdman had choreographed a production of Jean-Paul Sartre's The Flies (1947) for the Vassar Experimental Theatre, the Broadway production of Jean Giraudoux's The Enchanted (1950) and collaborating with writer William Saroyan and composer Alan Hovhaness, she directed and choreographed Otherman or The Beginning of a New Nation (1954) at Bard College. The newly named Jean Erdman Theater of Dance toured the U.S. and gave concerts in New York City. Among the notable works of this period are Twenty Poems (1960), a cycle of E. E. Cummings's poems for eight dancers and one actor with a commissioned score by Teiji Ito, performed in the round at the Circle in the Square Theatre in Greenwich Village and The Castle, an exploration of improvised and structured movement with jazz clarinetist-saxophonist Jimmy Giuffre at the Brooklyn Academy of Music (1970).

In 1962 with the aid of a grant from the Ingram Merrill Foundation, Erdman began what was to become her best-known work, The Coach with the Six Insides, an adaptation of James Joyce's, Finnegans Wake. The title is a line from the text found in episode 11.3.359. She became acquainted with the novel during the four-and-a-half-year period that her husband collaborated with Henry Morton Robinson to write A Skeleton Key to Finnegans Wake (1944).

While Joyce's story is told from the perspective of the male barkeeper Humphrey Chimpden Earwicker, Erdman's work a combination of dance, mime, and Joycean stream of consciousness language focuses on the female psyche, as seen through the many incarnations of the main female character Anna Livia Plurabelle. She danced all the aspects of Anna Livia from young woman, to old crone, to the rain itself that becomes the River Liffey flowing through the heart of Dublin. Teiji Ito was the musical director and composed the musical score on a vast array of instruments from around the world including among others, Japanese bass drums, Tibetan cymbals, a violin and an accordion.

The Coach with the Six Insides premiered at the Village South Theatre in Greenwich Village on November 26, 1962. It ran for 114 performances and received the Obie and Vernon Rice Awards for Outstanding Achievement in theater. Following the first New York season it began a world tour including engagements in Spoleto, Paris, Dublin and Tokyo. Three other North American tours as well as another New York season in 1967 followed, at the East 74th Street Theater on the Upper East Side. In 1964 the work was featured on the CBS's Camera Three series and in 1966 WNET Channel 13 produced an interview with both Erdman and Campbell, A Viewer's Guide to the Coach with the Six Insides. Many dance historians continue to regard The Coach with the Six Insides as "the most successful—and celebrated—attempt to unite dance and words."

Other theater productions Erdman choreographed during this period include the Helen Hayes Repertory production of Hamlet (1964), the Lincoln Center Repertory production of Federico García Lorca's Yerma (1962) and the New York Shakespeare Festival production of the rock-opera Two Gentlemen of Verona (1971–72), which ran on Broadway for two years and for which Erdman received the Drama Desk Award and a Tony nomination.

Erdman was an active teacher throughout her career. In 1948 she opened her own studio where she taught a style-neutral, concept-based technique she developed by combining her study of world dance with anatomical principles. She described it as, "a basic dance training that would, in its most elementary form give the novice an essential experience of the art form, and in more complex variations create a professional dance artist with a completely articulate instrument capable of responding in movement to any choreographic impulse."

From 1949 to 1951 she directed the modern dance department at Teachers College of Columbia University. In the summers from 1949 to 1955 she was the artist in residence and head of the dance department at the University of Colorado in Boulder. From 1954 to 1957 she was the chairman of the dance department at Bard College. She was founding director of the dance program at NYU's Tisch School of the Arts and taught there from 1966 to 1971.

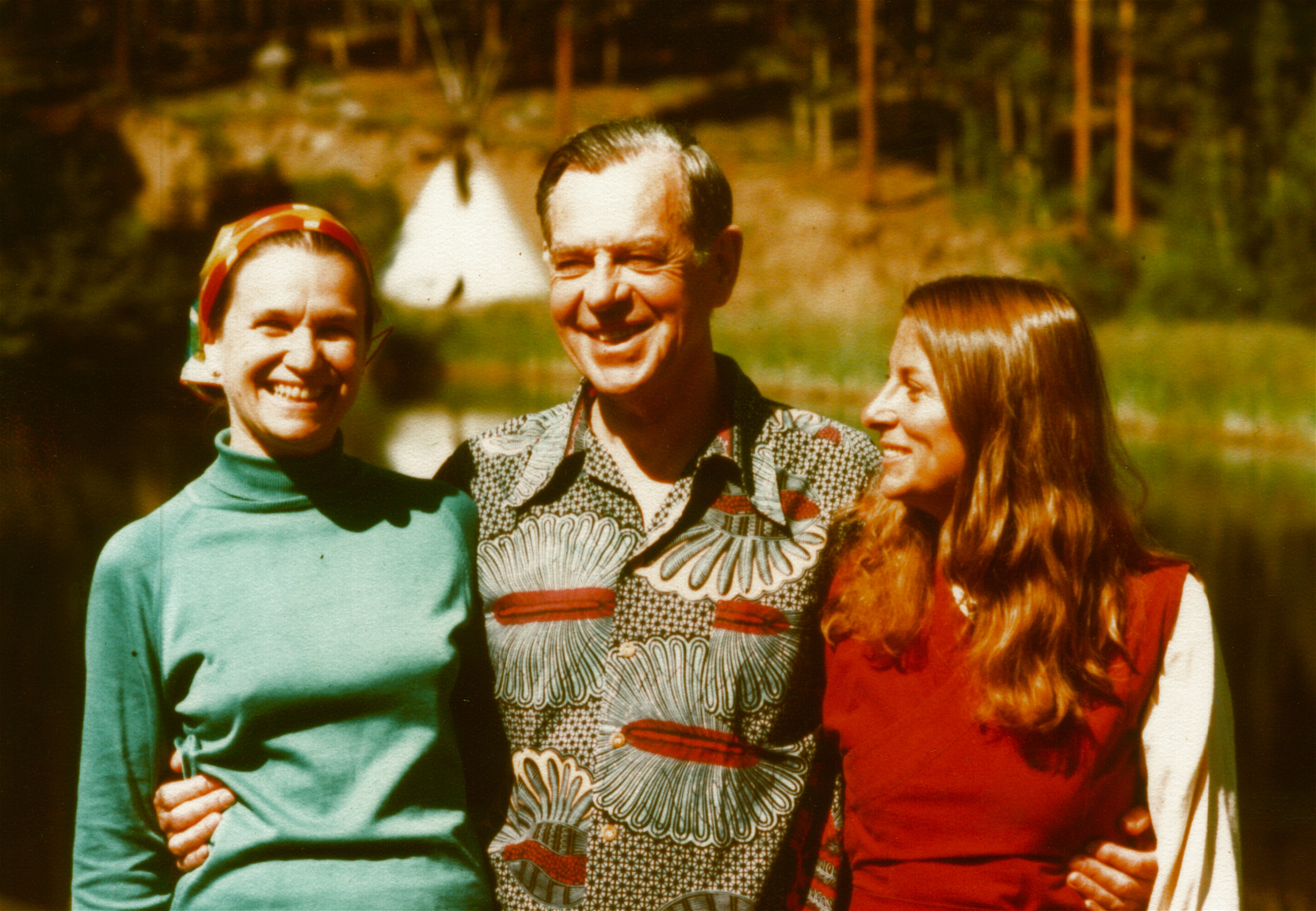
Left to right: Jean, Joseph Campbell and Joan Halifax, at Feathered Pipe Ranch, Montana, late 1970s

In the 1980s, Erdman began reviving her early dance repertory and presenting it annually at The Open Eye. These performances culminated in the NEA-funded Jean Erdman Retrospective at the Hunter Playhouse in 1985, New York City. New York Times dance critic Anna Kisselgoff wrote, "anyone wishing to know something about where modern dance is today can find the roots in this retrospective." From 1987 to 1993, Erdman served as artistic director of an NEA funded project to create a three volume video archive of these early dance works, Dance and Myth: The World of Jean Erdman.

=== Personal life ===
Erdman and Campbell had no children. For most of their forty-nine years of marriage they shared a two-room apartment in Greenwich Village in New York City. In the 1980s they also purchased an apartment in Honolulu and divided their time between the two cities. Campbell died in 1987. In 1990, Erdman became the founding president of the Joseph Campbell Foundation and continued as its president emerita until her death. Since 1995 Erdman had lived exclusively in Hawaii.

Erdman died at the age of 104 in a nursing facility in Honolulu on May 4, 2020.

== Filmography ==
- Invocation: Maya Deren (1987)
- The Hero's Journey: The World of Joseph Campbell (1987)
- Dance and Myth - The World of Jean Erdman (1990)

== Awards and nominations ==
Awards

- 1972: Drama Desk Award for Outstanding Choreography - The Two Gentlemen of Verona
- 1963: Obie Award - Special Citation - The Coach with the Six Insides
- 1963: Vernon Rice Award for Outstanding Achievement in Theatre - The Coach with the Six Insides
- 1993: Heritage Award from the National Dance Association for contributions to dance education
- 1995 Sacred Dance Guild Honorary Lifetime Member awarded at Kalani Honua, Big Island Hawaii

Nominations

- 1972: Tony Award for Best Choreography - The Two Gentlemen of Verona
