= Creative Mythology =

1968 book by Joseph Campbell

Creative Mythology (The Masks of God, volume IV)
- Cover of the first edition
- Author: Joseph Campbell
- Language: English
- Subject: Mythology
- Published: 1968
- Publication place: United States
- Pages: 730 (1968 Secker & Warburg edition)
- ISBN: 978-0140194401

Creative Mythology is volume IV of The Masks of God by comparative mythologist Joseph Campbell.

== Summary ==
Campbell writes that in "creative mythology", "the individual has had an experience of his own - of order, horror, beauty, or even mere exhilaration-which he seeks to communicate through signs; and if his realization has been of a certain depth and import, his communication will have the force and value of living myth-for those, that is to say, who receive and respond to it of themselves, with recognition, uncoerced.” Campbell gives as examples Thomas Mann and James Joyce.
