= Joseph Campbell and the Power of Myth =

1988 PBS documentary series, or its companion book

- Also known as: Joseph Campbell and the Power of Myth
- Starring: Joseph Campbell; Bill Moyers
- Country of origin: United States
- No. of episodes: 6

Production
- Running time: 360 minutes (60 minutes per episode)

Original release
- Network: PBS
- Release: June 21 – June 26, 1988

Joseph Campbell and the Power of Myth is a PBS documentary from 1988. The documentary was originally broadcast as six one-hour conversations between mythologist Joseph Campbell (1904–1987) and journalist Bill Moyers. It remains one of the most popular series in the history of American public television. The 1988 companion book The Power of Myth was adapted from the same interviews.

== Overview ==
The interviews in the first five episodes were filmed at George Lucas's Skywalker Ranch in California, with the sixth interview conducted at the American Museum of Natural History in New York, during the final two summers of Campbell's life. (The series was broadcast on television the year following his death.) In these discussions Campbell presents his ideas about comparative mythology and the ongoing role of myth in human society. These talks include excerpts from Campbell's seminal work The Hero with a Thousand Faces

== Documentary series ==
The documentary series Joseph Campbell and the Power of Myth was broadcast in six parts:

- Episode 1: The Hero's Adventure (first broadcast June 21, 1988 on PBS)

About Campbell, hero types, hero deeds, Jesus Christ, the Buddha, Krishna, movie heroes, Star Wars as a metaphor, an Iroquois story: the refusal of suitors, dragons, dreams and Jungian psychology, “follow your bliss,” consciousness in plants, Gaia, Chartres Cathedral, spirituality vs. economics, emerging myths, “Earthrise” as a symbol.

- Episode 2: The Message of the Myth (first broadcast June 22, 1988 on PBS)

Creation myths, transcending duality, pairs of opposites, God vs. Nature, sin, morality, participation in sorrow, the Gospel of Thomas, Old Time Religion, computers, religion as “software,” the story of Indra: “What a great boy am I!,” participation in society.

- Episode 3: The First Storytellers (first broadcast June 23, 1988 on PBS)

Animal memories, harmonization with body and life-cycle, consciousness vs. its vehicle, killing for food, story: “The Buffalo's Wife,” buffalo massacre, initiation ritual, rituals diminishing, crime increasing, artists, the Shaman, the center of the world.

- Episode 4: Sacrifice and Bliss (first broadcast June 24, 1988 on PBS)

Chief Seattle, the sacred Earth, agricultural renewal, human sacrifice, sacrifice of the Mass, transcendence of death, story: “The Green Knight,” societal dictates vs. following bliss, “hidden hands” guiding life's work.

- Episode 5: Love and the Goddess (first broadcast June 25, 1988 on PBS)

The Troubadours, Eros, romantic love, Tristan, libido vs. credo, separation from love, Satan, loving your enemy, the Crucifixion as atonement, virgin birth, the story of Isis, Osiris and Horus, the Madonna, the Big Bang, the correlation between the earth or mother Goddess and images of fertility (the sacred feminine).

- Episode 6: Masks of Eternity (first broadcast June 26, 1988 on PBS)

Identifying with the infinite, the circle as a symbol, clowns and masks, epiphanies and James Joyce, artistic arrest, the monstrous as sublime, the dance of Shiva, that which is beyond words.

== Companion book ==
The Power of Myth
- Author: Joseph Campbell; Bill Moyers; Betty Sue Flowers (ed.)
- Cover artist: Cathy Saksa
- Language: English
- Subject: Myth
- Genre: Non-Fiction
- Publisher: Doubleday
- Publication date: 1988
- Publication place: United States
- Media type: Print (hardcover, paperback)
- Pages: 231 (hardcover)
- ISBN: 0-385-24773-7 (hardcover); ISBN 0-385-24774-5 (paperback)
- OCLC: 17650532
- Dewey Decimal: 291.1/3 19
- LC Class: BL304 .C36 1988

The companion book for the series, The Power of Myth (Joseph Campbell, Bill Moyers, and editor Betty Sue Flowers), was released in 1988 at the same time the series aired on PBS. In the editor's note to The Power of Myth, Flowers credits Jacqueline Kennedy Onassis, as "the Doubleday editor, whose interest in the ideas of Joseph Campbell was the prime mover in the publication of this book." The book follows the format of the documentary and provides additional discussions not included in the original six-hour release. Chapters:

1. Myth and the Modern World
2. The Journey Inward
3. The First Storytellers
4. Sacrifice and Bliss
5. The Hero's Adventure
6. The Gift of the Goddess
7. Tales of Love and Marriage
8. Masks of Eternity
9. The Tale of Buddha

The Power of Myth is based on the interviews between Joseph Campbell and Bill Moyers that were the basis for the acclaimed television series. It deals with the universality and evolution of myths in the history of the human race and the place of myths in modern society. Campbell blends accounts of his own upbringing and experience with stories from many cultures and civilizations to present the reader with his most compelling thesis that modern society is going through a transition from the old mythologies and traditions to a new way of thinking where a global mythology will emerge.

Some of the material in the first chapter comes from Campbell's previously published books, The Hero with a Thousand Faces and The Masks of God. The main theme of the book is the universality of myths—what Campbell calls "mankind's one great story"— that occur throughout the history of mankind, no matter which epoch or whichever culture or society is considered. Myths are the body of stories and legends that a people perceive as being an integral part of their culture. Before the invention of writing, these stories and legends were handed down from generation to generation in the form of rituals and oral traditions. The reappearance of certain themes, time and again, in different mythologies, leads to the realization that these themes portray universal and eternal truths about mankind.

Campbell defines the function of a mythology as the provision of a cultural framework for a society or people to educate their young, and to provide them with a means of coping with their passage through the different stages of life from birth to death. In a general sense myths include religion as well and the development of religion is an intrinsic part of a society's culture. A mythology is inevitably bound to the society and time in which it occurs and cannot be divorced from this culture and environment. This is true even though Western society previously learnt from, and was informed by, the mythology of other cultures by including the study of Greek and Roman writings as part of its heritage.

The record of the history of the development of a culture and society is embodied in its mythology. For example, the Bible describes the evolution of the Judeo-Christian concept of God from the time when the Jews were in Babylon and the god they worshiped corresponded to a local tribal god, to when the concept became that of a world savior as a result of the Hebrews becoming a major force in the East Mediterranean region. The geographic context of a specific mythology also plays a role in its evolution. The physical scope of Biblical mythology was limited to the general area of the Middle East but in other parts of the world, Chinese and Aztec religions and cultures emerged as separate and distinct belief systems. When different cultures expand their spheres of influence they eventually come into contact with each other, and the outcome of the collision, be it conquest, subjugation, or amalgamation, will be evident in the resultant mythology.

The form and function of mythology in the modern world is the main topic of this chapter and to illustrate his ideas, Campbell recounts aspects of his own earlier life. Without specifically stating it, the assumption is made that the modern world under consideration is that of Campbell's world—the Christian-based, urbanized culture of North America, the so-called Modern Western Society.

Campbell describes his own upbringing as a Roman Catholic and his early fascination with the myths and stories of the American Indians. He recalls the excitement he felt when he realized that the motifs of creation, death, resurrection, and ascension into heaven, which the nuns were teaching him at his school, also occurred in American Indian myths. This was the beginning of his lifelong interest in comparative mythology. Later on in life he found the same universal themes in Hinduism and in the medieval Arthurian legends.

The discussion considers the role of myth and ritual in contemporary society. Contemporary rituals are carried out to mark special events in private lives, such as an individual's marriage or enlistment in a branch of the armed forces and on public occasions such as the inauguration of civil and national leaders. In the Introduction to the book, Moyers recalls Campbell's description of the solemn state funeral after the assassination of John F. Kennedy as an "illustration of the high service of ritual to a society," and where Campbell identifies the ritualized occasion as fulfilling a great social necessity.

In general, however, Campbell and Moyers reach the conclusion that there is a lack of effective mythology and ritual in modern American society. They find nothing that compares with the powerful puberty rituals of primitive societies. They claim that the exclusion of classical studies from the modern educational syllabus has led to a lack of awareness of the mythological foundations of Western society's heritage. This, combined with an increased materialism and emphasis on technology, has led to modern youth in New York becoming alienated from the mainstream of society and inventing their own morality, initiations and gangs.

Marriage, as an example of a paramount modern social institution, becomes the next subject of discussion. Campbell differentiates between marriage and love affairs and imparts some very lofty ideals to marriage, in contrast to love affairs, that he categorically states inevitably end in disappointment. True marriage, in Campbell's opinion, embodies a spiritual identity and invokes the image of an incarnate God. Campbell and Moyers agree that the main objective of marriage is not the birth of children and the raising of families. They discard the concept of perpetuation of the human species as being the primary function of marriage and relegate this to a first stage. This first stage is followed by a second one where the offspring have departed into the world and only the couple is left. Campbell invokes the image of marriage as being an ordeal in which the ego is sacrificed to a relationship in which two have become one. This, he states, is a mythological image that embodies the sacrifice of the visible for a transcendent good. Campbell labels this stage of marriage as the alchemical stage. On the subject of the ritual of marriage, Campbell and Moyers complain that it has lost its force and has become a mere remnant of the original; they contend that the ritual that once conveyed an inner reality is now merely form.

The interviews between Campbell and Moyers are recorded at George Lucas' Skywalker Ranch. Campbell and Lucas became friends when Lucas publicly acknowledged the influence Campbell's writings had on the development of his hugely successful film "Star Wars." Campbell expresses great enthusiasm for this film, a film that he says conforms to classical mythological legends. So it is not surprising that there are many references to the characters from "Star Wars" throughout the book. In a similar fashion, John Wayne is identified as a modern myth and Campbell recalls Douglas Fairbanks as having been a boyhood hero.

At the beginning of this chapter, and in other parts of the book, Campbell states that modern society lacks the stability it previously derived from being educated in the mythology and legends of the Greek and Roman classics. Campbell and Moyers agree that there is no effective mythology in modern society by which individuals can relate to their role in the world. An analysis of the national symbols of the United States is used by Campbell to illustrate the ability for myths to incorporate the beliefs of a whole society and to provide the mythology to unify a nation. Contemporary lunar exploration and the publication of the image of the Earth offer a universal realization that human beings must identify with the entire planet. This concept of the emergence of a new mythology based on global aspects of life is reiterated several times by Campbell.

== Star Wars ==
In the first episode of the series, The Hero's Adventure, and the fifth chapter of the book, "The Hero's Adventure," Moyers and Campbell discuss George Lucas' report that Campbell's work directly influenced the creation of the Star Wars films. Moyers and Lucas filmed an interview 12 years later in 1999, modeled after The Power of Myth. It was called the Mythology of Star Wars with George Lucas & Bill Moyers and further discussed the impact of Campbell's work on Lucas' films.

== Errata ==
The words attributed to Chief Seattle, read by Campbell in the fourth episode of the series, were actually written by Ted Perry for a 1972 ecology film called Home. Perry adapted the text from newspaper accounts that were, in turn, published years after Chief Seattle delivered the actual speech.

== Views on religious fundamentalism ==
During the interview, Campbell reveals his views on religious fundamentalism in the modern world.

On this immediate level of life and structure, myths offer life models. But the models have to be appropriate to the time in which you are living, and our time has changed so fast that what was proper fifty years ago is not proper today. The virtues of the past are the vices of today. And many of what were thought to be the vices of the past are the necessities of today. The moral order has to catch up with the moral necessities of actual life in time, here and now. And that is what we are not doing. The old-time religion belongs to another age, another people, another set of human values, another universe. By going back you throw yourself out of sync with history. Our kids lose their faith in the religions that were taught to them, and they go inside."

== Related media ==
Print

Moyers, Bill and Joseph Campbell. The Power of Myth (1988). Betty Sue Flowers (ed.). New York: Doubleday, hardcover: ISBN 0-385-24773-7

Audio

Joseph Campbell and the Power of Myth with Bill Moyers (2001). Penguin/Highbridge, ISBN 1-56511-510-4.

Video

Joseph Campbell and the Power of Myth with Bill Moyers (2010). Bonus Moyers interview The Mythology of Star Wars, a 1999 conversation with George Lucas about Campbell's influence. Acorn Media/Athena.

== See also ==
- The Hero's Journey: The World of Joseph Campbell, 1987 film
- The Hero's Journey: Joseph Campbell on His Life and Work, 1990 book
