= David Kudler =

American editor and author (born 1962)

- Born: 1962 (age 63–64)
- Education: Stanford University, National Theatre Conservatory
- Notable work: The Hero with a Thousand Faces, Risuko
- Website: davidkudler.com

David Kudler (born 1962) is an American editor and author. He is best known for editing numerous posthumous editions of the books by Joseph Campbell, including Pathways to Bliss and the 2008 edition of The Hero with a Thousand Faces.

For the Joseph Campbell Foundation, he served as the managing editor of the Collected Works of Joseph Campbell series for over twenty years. In 2012, he started Stillpoint Digital Press, producing print, ebook and audiobook editions. He has contributed to Huffington Post, Medium, and a number of other websites, writing mostly about books and publishing.

His young adult historical adventure novel Risuko was published in June, 2016. Bright Eyes, the second book in the Seasons of the Sword tetralogy, came out on May 5, 2022. Kano, the next book in the series, came in April, 2024, and the finale, Murasaki, appeared in September, 2025.

Kudler is also a stage actor who has appeared with American Conservatory Theater, Denver Center Theatre Company, California Shakespeare Theater, Marin Theatre Company, A Traveling Jewish Theater, and Theatreworks (Silicon Valley).

== Bibliography ==
=== By David Kudler ===
- The Seven Gods of Luck, illustrated by Linda Finch, Houghton Mifflin, 1998. ISBN 978-0-395-78830-1. 15th Anniversary Edition, Stillpoint Digital Press, 2012. ISBN 9781938808005
- Shlomo Travels to Warsaw with Maura Vaughn, Stillpoint Digital Press, 2013. ISBN 9781310127939
- How Raven Brought Back the Light with Maura Vaughn, Stillpoint Digital Press, 2014. ISBN 9781311769985
- Inside the Box: An Introduction to ePub, HTML & CSS for the Independent Author/Publisher, Stillpoint Digital Press, ISBN 978-1-938808-45-6
- Risuko: A Kunoichi Tale, Stillpoint Digital Press, 2016. ISBN 978-1-938808-32-6
- Bright Eyes: A Kunoichi Tale, Stillpoint Digital Press, 2022 ISBN 978-1-938808-63-0
- Kano: A Kunoichi Tale, Stillpoint Digital Press, 2024 ISBN 978-1-938808-70-8
- Murasaki: A Kunoichi Tale, Stillpoint Digital Press, 2025 ISBN 978-1-938808-73-9, 978-1-938808-74-6, 978-1-938808-75-3

=== Edited by David Kudler ===
- Joseph Campbell, Sake and Satori: Asian Journals—Japan, New World Library, 2002. ISBN 978-1-57731-236-9
- Joseph Campbell, Myths of Light: Eastern Metaphors of the Eternal, New World Library, 2003. ISBN 978-1-57731-403-5
- Joseph Campbell, Pathways to Bliss: Mythology and Personal Transformation, New World Library, 2005. ISBN 978-1-57731-471-4
- Joseph Campbell, The Hero with a Thousand Faces, New World Library, 2008. ISBN 978-1-57731-593-3
- Maura Vaughn, The Anatomy of a Choice: An Actor's Guide to Text Analysis, University Press of America, 2010. ISBN 978-0-7618-5109-7
- Jack Beritzhoff, Sail Away: Journeys of a Merchant Seaman, Stillpoint Digital Press, 2012. ISBN 9781475143867
- Joseph Campbell, Mythic Imagination: Collected Short Fiction, New World Library, 2012. ISBN 9781608681532
- Kenneth Schneyer, The Law & the Heart: Speculative Stories to Bend the Mind and Soul, Stillpoint Digital Press, 2014. ISBN 978-1938808227
- Lynn Arias Bornstein, Laura English, Stillpoint Digital Press, 2014. ISBN 978-1938808135
- Joseph Campbell, Asian Journals: India & Japan, New World Library, 2017. ISBN 978-1-60868504-2
- Heather Albano, Timepiece, Stillpoint Digital Press, 2017. ISBN 978-1938808357
- Heather Albano, Timekeeper, Stillpoint Digital Press, 2017. ISBN 978-1938808418
- Heather Albano, Timebound, Stillpoint Digital Press, 2017. ISBN 978-1938808500
- Cady West, Darcy & Desire, Stillpoint Digital Press, 2021. ISBN 978-1938808586

== See also ==
- Jacqueline Kudler
