= Betty Sue Flowers =

American English professor, author and editor

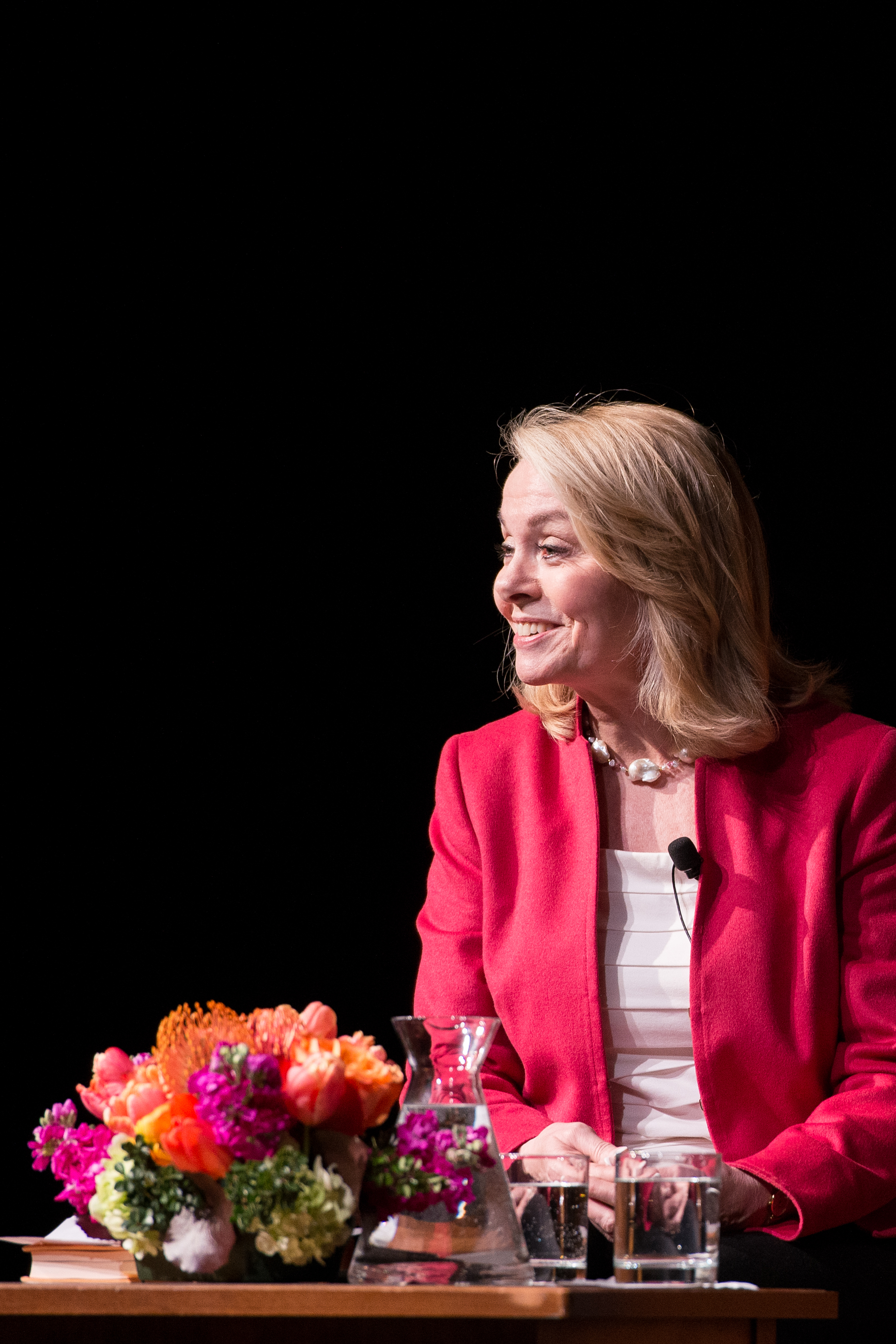
- Born: February 2, 1947 (age 79); Waco, Texas, U.S.
- Occupation: English professor

Betty Sue Flowers (born February 2, 1947) is the former director of the Lyndon Baines Johnson Library and Museum (2002–2009) and a Distinguished Teaching Professor Emerita and Joan Negley Kelleher Centennial Professor Emerita of English at the University of Texas at Austin. She is also an international foresight consultant, poet, and editor whose publications range from poetry therapy to global sustainability.

== Early life and education ==
Flowers is a native Texan, born in Waco, Texas. She earned her B.A. in 1969 from the University of Texas at Austin (Plan II Liberal Arts Honors Program, with High Honors and Special Honors in English; Phi Beta Kappa) and her M.A. in 1970 from the same institution. She received her Ph.D. from the University of London in 1973. She was the student commencement speaker for the College of Arts & Sciences at her own graduation ceremony in 1969.

== Career ==
Flowers joined the English Department at UT Austin as an assistant professor in 1973 upon completing her doctorate. She was promoted to associate professor in 1979 and then full professor in 1989. She held the Joan Negley Kelleher Centennial Professorship in Rhetoric and Composition from 2001 to 2002 and was a member of the University's Academy of Distinguished Teachers.

A widely cited contribution to writing pedagogy is her 1979 essay "Madman, Architect, Carpenter, Judge: Roles and the Writing Process," in which she proposed a framework of four competing internal roles to help writers overcome creative blocks. The framework, sometimes called the "Flowers Paradigm," was later reprinted in the Harbrace College Handbook (Canadian edition, Harcourt Brace, 1986) and cited as a cover article in Trial: Journal of the Association of Trial Lawyers of America in May 1997.

Flowers served as series consultant for the PBS documentary Joseph Campbell and the Power of Myth, a six-part series of conversations between journalist Bill Moyers and mythologist Joseph Campbell, recorded primarily at George Lucas’s Skywalker Ranch in 1985 and 1986 and broadcast in 1988. She also edited the companion book Joseph Campbell and the Power of Myth, published by Doubleday in 1988, which became a New York Times bestseller.

Flowers's entry into scenario planning grew from her collaboration with Joseph Jaworski. When Jaworski was hired as director of scenarios at Royal Dutch Shell in London, he invited Flowers to join him as scenario editor; from 1992 through the early 2020s, she worked on virtually every global scenario set produced by Shell.

=== Director of the LBJ Library and Museum ===
On September 17, 2001, Archivist of the United States John W. Carlin announced the appointment of Flowers as director of the Lyndon Baines Johnson Library and Museum, effective January 7, 2002. She succeeded Harry J. Middleton, who had directed the library since 1971. During her tenure she received the Archives Special Achievement Award from the Archivist of the United States (2008) and the Dewey Winburne Award for Community Service through Technology and Media (2008).

Flowers announced her resignation on February 18, 2009, and was succeeded as director by presidential historian Mark K. Updegrove, whose appointment was effective October 11, 2009.

== Selected honours and awards ==
- Phi Beta Kappa, University of Texas at Austin (1969)
- Andrew W. Mellon Fellowship, Aspen Institute for Humanistic Studies (1976)
- Amoco Teaching Excellence Award (1979)
- Holloway Teaching Award (1983)
- Outstanding Young Texas Ex (1987)
- First woman admitted to a Rotary Club in Texas (1989)
- 1997 Piper Professor (one of ten recipients statewide)
- Member, Academy of Distinguished Teachers, UT Austin
- Liz Carpenter Lifetime Achievement Award, Women in Communication (1998)
- Distinguished Alumnus, University of Texas (2001)
- Pro Bene Meritis Award, College of Liberal Arts, UT Austin (2002)
- Archives Special Achievement Award, National Archives (2008)
- Dewey Winburne Award for Community Service through Technology and Media (2008)
- Recognised among AAUW Texas's 100 significant women in Texas history

== Selected bibliography ==
=== Scholarly and edited works ===
- Browning and the Modern Tradition (Macmillan, 1976)
- Daughters and Fathers, co-edited with Lynda E. Boose (Johns Hopkins University Press, 1988)
- Synchronicity: The Inner Path of Leadership, by Joseph Jaworski (Berrett-Koehler, 1996)
- Christina Rossetti: The Complete Poems, Penguin English Poets Series (Penguin, 2001)
- Source: The Inner Path of Knowledge Creation, by Joseph Jaworski (Berrett-Koehler, 2012)
- Realistic Hope: Facing Global Challenges, co-edited with Angela Wilkinson (Amsterdam University Press, 2018)
- Heartfulness—Transformation in Christ: A Conversation with Thomas Keating and Betty Sue Flowers (Wayfarer Books, 2024)
- Scenarios: Crafting and Using Stories of the Future to Change the Present (BMI Publishing, 2025)

=== Books with Bill Moyers ===
- Joseph Campbell and the Power of Myth (Doubleday, 1988) — New York Times bestseller
- A World of Ideas (Doubleday, 1989) — New York Times bestseller
- Healing and the Mind (Doubleday, 1993)
- Genesis: A Living Conversation (Doubleday, 1996)

=== Co-authored books ===
- Presence: Human Purpose and the Field of the Future, with Peter Senge, C. Otto Scharmer, and Joseph Jaworski (Doubleday, 2005)

=== Poetry ===
- Four Shields of Power (with three other poets) (Plain View Press, 1987)
- Extending the Shade (Plain View Press, 1990)
- Blue Lioness (Plain View Press, 2002)

== Media work ==
- Consultant and onscreen subject for “The Mystery of Love,” PBS documentary;
- Story editor for “World Without Waves” (feature film—winner Best Southwest Film, 5th annual Santa Fe film festival; official selection, 26th Moscow International Film Festival).
- "Conversations with Betty Sue Flowers"-- 10-part series on KLRU tv (Austin-based PBS affiliate).
- Guest Moderator for "The Next 200 Years" (nationally syndicated) -- KUT FM, 1989-1997.
- Executive Producer, "The Philosophers" -- 6-part series for Swedish television, 1990-91.
- Seminar participant, "Six Great Ideas" with Bill Moyers and Mortimer Adler – six-part series aired on PBS, 1982.

== Personal life ==
Flowers' first marriage ended in 2005, with one son, John Michael, who graduated from her alma mater in 2009, at which she delivered the College of Liberal Arts commencement address. She resigned from the LBJ Library that same summer and moved to New York to partner with former New Jersey Senator and NBA star Bill Bradley.
