= A Skeleton Key to Finnegans Wake =

1944 work of literary criticism by Joseph Campbell and Henry Morton Robinson

- Cover of the first edition
- Authors: Joseph Campbell; Henry Morton Robinson
- Language: English
- Publisher: 1st edition: Harcourt Brace; 2nd: Viking Press; 3rd: New World Library
- Publication date: 1st ed. 1944; 2nd ed. 1968; 3rd ed. 2005
- Publication place: United States
- Media type: Print (hardcover and paperback)
- Pages: 400
- ISBN: 9781577314059 (3rd ed.)
- OCLC: 57452879
- Dewey Decimal: 823/.912 22
- LC Class: PR6019.O9 F57 2005

A Skeleton Key to Finnegans Wake is a 1944 work of literary criticism by mythologist Joseph Campbell and Henry Morton Robinson. The work gives both a general critical overview of Finnegans Wake and a detailed exegetical outline of the text.

According to Campbell and Robinson, Finnegans Wake is best interpreted in light of Giambattista Vico's philosophy, which holds that history proceeds in cycles and fails to achieve meaningful progress over time.

Campbell and Robinson began their analysis of Joyce's work because they had recognized in The Skin of Our Teeth (1942), the popular play by Thornton Wilder, an appropriation from Joyce's novel not only of themes but of plot and language as well. They published a pair of reviews-cum-denunciations of Skin of Our Teeth, both entitled "The Skin of Whose Teeth?" in The Saturday Review.

== Sources ==
- Burgum, Edwin Berry (1945). "The Interpretation of Joyce". The Virginia Quarterly Review. 21 (1): 134–144. ISSN 0042-675X. JSTOR 26442019.
