= The Hero's Journey (book) =

Biography of Joseph Campbell

The Hero's Journey: Joseph Campbell on His Life and Work
- First edition
- Language: English
- Genre: Biography
- Publisher: HarperCollins (1990)
- Publication date: 1990 (original), 1999 (second edition), 2003 (new edition)
- Publication place: United States

The Hero's Journey: Joseph Campbell on His Life and Work is a biography of the mythologist Joseph Campbell (1904–1987). In the form of a series of conversations, the book was drawn from the film, The Hero's Journey: A Biographical Portrait.

This book was originally published by HarperCollins in 1990. A second edition was published in 1999 by Element Books—which closed within weeks of the book's rerelease, leaving it out of print again until another new edition was published by New World Library in 2003 in anticipation of the centennial of Campbell's birth. This edition was the seventh title in the Joseph Campbell Foundation's Collected Works of Joseph Campbell series.

== Critical reception ==
Publishers Weekly said that readers of Campbell's previous works would enjoy The Hero's Journey while Library Journal said the book built upon previous known information about Campbell.
