= Henry Morton Robinson =

American novelist (1898–1961)

- Born: September 7, 1898; Boston, Massachusetts, U.S.
- Died: January 13, 1961 (aged 62); New York, U.S.
- Education: Columbia College
- Occupation: Novelist
- Children: Anthony Robinson
- Writing career
- Notable works: A Skeleton Key to Finnegans Wake, The Cardinal

Henry Morton Robinson (September 7, 1898 – January 13, 1961) was an American novelist, best known for A Skeleton Key to Finnegans Wake written with Joseph Campbell and his 1950 novel The Cardinal, which Time magazine reported was "The year's most popular book, fiction or nonfiction."

== Biography ==
Robinson was born in Boston and graduated from Columbia College in 1923 after serving in the U.S. Navy during the First World War. At Columbia, Henry Morton Robinson was a member of the Philolexian Society.

He was an instructor in English at Columbia University, and a senior editor at Reader's Digest.

On December 23, 1960, he fell asleep in a hot bath after taking a sedative. Three weeks later, on January 13, 1961, he died in New York of complications from the resulting second- and third-degree burns.

He is buried in Artists Cemetery in Woodstock, New York. His son, Anthony Robinson, is also a noted novelist.

== Career ==
His best-known novel The Cardinal details the life of Stephen Fermoyle, a young American priest who eventually becomes a Prince of the Church. The story is based in part on the life of Francis Cardinal Spellman, Archbishop of New York (1939–1967). The Cardinal was adapted into an Academy Award-nominated film in 1963, directed by Otto Preminger and starring Tom Tryon, however, the plot was rather loosely adapted from Morton's novel.

Robinson also wrote The Perfect Round (1947). An excerpt from that novel was adapted into a screenplay by Richard Carr and put to film by David Carradine in a movie called Americana. The film won The People's Choice Award at the Director's Fortnight at the Cannes Film Festival, in 1981. Audiences liked the film, but it was not well received by critics.

== Bibliography ==
- Children of Morningside (1924) poetry
- Buck Fever (1929) poetry
- Stout Cortez: a Biography of the Spanish Conquest (1931)
- Science Versus Crime (1935)
- Second Wisdom (1937) poetry
- A Skeleton Key to Finnegans Wake, with Joseph Campbell (1944)
- The Perfect Round (1947, filmed as Americana in 1983)
- The Great Snow (1947)
- The Cardinal (1950) about the life of a Roman Catholic priest.
- The Enchanted Grindstone and Other Poems (1952) poetry
- Water of Life (1960) Impact of whiskey-making on three generations of an Indiana family.
