= Eugene Kennedy =

American psychologist, writer and columnist

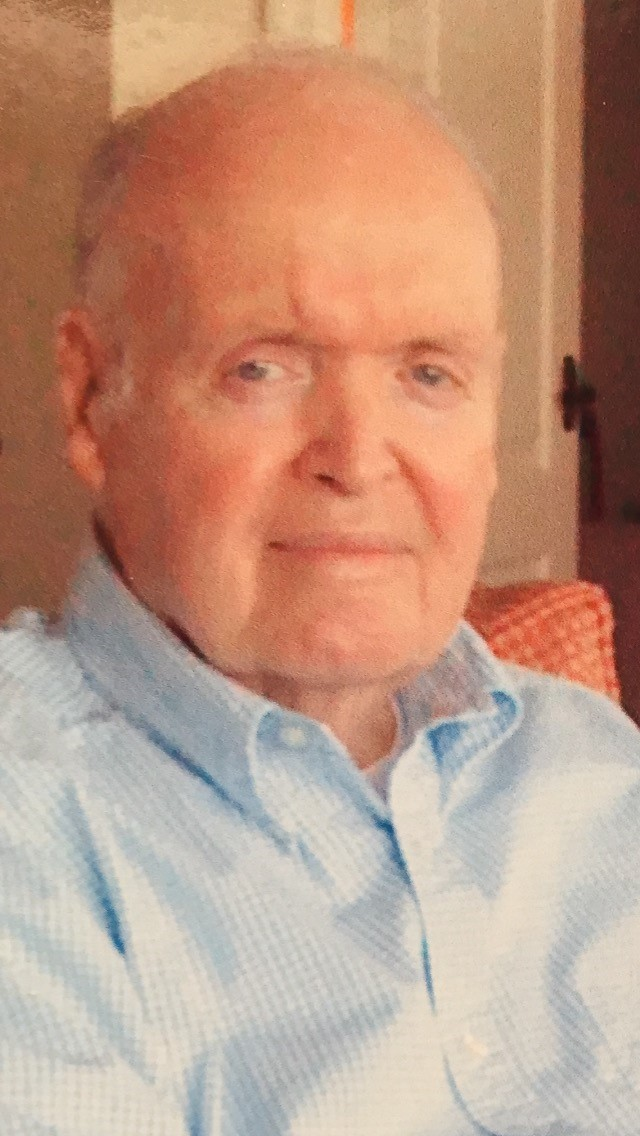
Photo courtesy of Sara Charles Kennedy, MD

Eugene Cullen Kennedy (August 28, 1928 – June 3, 2015) was a psychologist, writer, columnist, and professor emeritus of Loyola University Chicago. Kennedy was a laicized Catholic priest and a long-time observer of the Catholic Church, but his work spans many genres. He published over 50 books, including two biographies, three novels, and a play, as well as books on psychology, the Roman Catholic Church, and the relationship between psychology and religion. In the early 1970s, inspired by Vatican II, he emerged as a voice for reform and modernization of the Roman Catholic Church.

== Early life and education ==
Eugene Cullen Kennedy was born in Syracuse, New York, on August 28, 1928, to second-generation Irish parents, James Donald Kennedy and Gertrude Veronica Cullen. His father was an executive with the King Kullen Grocery Company, the family-owned supermarket chain founded by Kennedy's uncle, Michael J. Cullen, and his mother was a homemaker. During the 1980s, Kennedy became a consultant to King Kullen and a member of its board of directors, positions he held until his death.

Raised in Long Island, Kennedy graduated from Chaminade High School in Mineola, NY, in 1946, then entered the Maryknoll Seminary in Maryknoll, NY. From that institution, Kennedy received a B.A. (1950), S.T.B (1953) and M.R.E. (1954). Following his ordination to the priesthood on June 11, 1955, he was instructor in psychology at the Maryknoll Seminary in Clarks Summit, PA, before beginning graduate studies in psychology at the Catholic University of America, where he obtained an MA (1958) and a PhD (1962).

== Career ==
Kennedy was a licensed psychologist in Illinois, and professor of psychology and counselor at Maryknoll College, Glen Ellyn, Illinois, from 1960 until 1971. He was Professor of Psychology at Loyola University of Chicago from 1969 until his retirement in 1995, when he became professor emeritus. He was a Fellow of the American Psychological Association and served as President of Division 36 (1975–1976) where he led a resurgence of the phenomenologically based research into religion.

Kennedy first gained attention among Catholic readers in 1965 with the publication of his first book, The Genius of the Apostolate, which he co-authored with Paul D'Arcy M.M. In 1967, Kennedy published Fashion Me a People, which won the Catholic Book Award, an award he again won in 1968 for his third book, Comfort My People. During the 1970s, he published twenty-five books, including In the Spirit, In the Flesh (1971), The Return to Man (1973), Believing (1974), Living With Loneliness (1974), On Becoming a Counselor (1977), Sexual Counseling, St. Patrick's Day with Mayor Daley (1976) and Himself (1978), his biography of Mayor Richard Daley of Chicago, which won both the Thomas More Medal for "the most distinguished contribution to Catholic Literature in 1978" as well as the Carl Sandburg Award (1978) for the best non-fiction by a Chicago author.

His On Becoming a Counselor has been described as "an unusually helpful, well-conceived guide" for non-professional counselors – those persons such as teachers, lawyers, ministers, nurses, priests and others – who may have to do counseling as part of their professional work.

During the 1980s, Kennedy co-authored Defendant with his wife, Sara Charles. He also published three novels: Father's Day (1981), which was awarded the Carl Sandburg Award for the best fiction by a Chicago author in 1980–1981; Queen Bee (1984); and Fixes (1989). He also wrote a one-man play, I Would Be Called John, based on the life of Pope John XXIII, which became a PBS special featuring Charles Durning.

During the 1990s and into the new century, Kennedy, continued to publish, including a biography of Joseph Cardinal Bernardin,This Man Bernardin (1996), and reflections on his relationship with the Cardinal in My Brother Joseph (1997). Kennedy also published Authority (with Sara Charles)(1997), The Unhealed Wound (2001), and his last book, Believing (2013), which won a Catholic Book Award First Prize from the Catholic Press Association. At the time of his death, Kennedy was working with Sara Charles on the 4th edition of On Becoming a Counselor.

In addition to publishing a number of books, Kennedy also wrote articles and opinion pieces in numerous publications and newsletters, as well as columns for the Chicago Tribune, Religious News Service and the National Catholic Reporter's "Bulletins from the Human Side. He was awarded the Wilber Award in 1987 by the Religious Public Relations Council for his New York Times Magazine article, "A Dissenting Voice."

Throughout his career, Kennedy was a frequent TV commentator on politics and religion and lectured widely. His final lecture was given on Maryknoll Alumni Day, celebrating the 100th anniversary of Maryknoll, on September 16, 2011.

== Personal ==
Kennedy left the priesthood in 1977 and married Sara Charles M.D. They had homes in Chicago and Michigan.

Kennedy died at Lakeland Hospital, St. Joseph, Michigan, of heart failure. His funeral Mass was celebrated in Old St. Patrick's Church in Chicago and he is buried in Resurrection Cemetery in St. Joseph, Michigan.

== Works ==
=== General non-fiction ===
- The Genius of the Apostolate. with Paul F. D'Arcy. New York: Sheed and Ward, 1965
- Fashion Me a People: Man, Woman and the Church. New York: Sheed and Ward, 1967
- Comfort My People: The Pastoral Presence of the Church. New York: Sheed and Ward, 1968
- The People are the Church. 1969
- A Time for Love.1970
- The Catholic Priest in the United States: psychological investigations, with Víctor J. Heckler. Washington D.C.: United States Catholic Conference, 1972.
- What A Modern Catholic Thinks About Sex. 1971
- In the Spirit, In the Flesh. 1971
- The New Sexuality. 1972
- The Pain of Being Human. 1972
- What A Modern Catholic Thinks About Marriage. 1972
- Living with Loneliness. 1973
- The Heart of Loving. 1973
- Return to Man. 1973
- The Joy of Being Human. 1974
- Believing. 1974
- Living with Everyday Problems. 1974
- A Contemporary Meditation on Prayer. 1975
- If You Real/y Knew Me, Would You Still Like Me? 1975
- A Sense of Life, A Sense of Sin. 1975
- Human Rights and Psychological Research. ed., 1975
- What a Modern Catholic Thinks About Sex and Marriage. 1975
- The Trouble Book. 1976
- St. Patrick's Day with Mayor Daley. 1976
- A Time for Being Human. 1977
- On Becoming a Counselor. 1977
- Sexual Counseling. 1977
- Free To Be Human. 1979
- The Choice to Be Human. 1981
- On Being a Friend. 1982
- Loneliness and Everyday Problems. 1983
- Crisis Counseling. 1984
- Defendant: A Psychiatrist on Trial for Medical Malpractice. (with Sara Charles) 1985
- The Now and Future Church. 1985
- Reimagining American Catholicism: The American Bishops and Their Pastoral Letters. 1985
- The Trouble with Being Human. 1986
- A Time for Being Human. 1987
- Tomorrow's Catholics, Yesterday's Church. 1988
- On Becoming a Counselor - 2nd edition. 1990
- Authority: The Most Misunderstood Idea in America. (with Sara Charles) 1997
- On Becoming a Counselor- 3rd edition. (with Sara Charles) 2001
- The Unhealed Wound: The Church and Human Sexuality. 2001
- Joseph Campbell: Thou Art That: Transforming Religious Metaphor (editor). 2001
- 9-11: Meditations at the Center of the World. 2002
- Would You Like to Be a Catholic? 2003
- Blogging Toward Bethlehem. 2007
- Believing. 2013

=== Fiction ===
- Father's Day. 1981 (Doubleday/Pocket)
- Queen Bee. 1982 (Doubleday)
- Fixes. 1989 (Doubleday)

=== Biography ===
- Himself. 1978 (Viking)
- Cardinal Bernardin. 1989
- This Man Bernardin. 1996
- My Brother Joseph. 1997
- Bernardin: Life to the Full. 1997
- Cardinal Bernardin's Stations of the Cross. 2003

=== Plays ===
- I Would Be Called John. 1986 (PBS)
