= The Hero's Journey (film) =

1987 documentary on Joseph Campbell

The Hero's Journey: A Biographical Portrait
- Directed by: William Free; Janelle Balnicke
- Release date: 1987
- Running time: 58 minutes
- Country: United States
- Language: English

The Hero's Journey is a 1987 biography of mythologist Joseph Campbell (1904–1987), directed by Janelle Balnicke and David Kennard. In the years just before his death, Campbell was filmed in conversation with his friends and colleagues, discussing his own life and career in terms of the myths that he studied throughout his life.

The conversations in the film led to the book, The Hero's Journey: Joseph Campbell on His Life and Work (1990).
