= Joseph Campbell Foundation =

- Founded: 1990
- Founder: Jean Erdman Campbell and Robert Walter
- Purpose: Education, Mythology
- Location: New York
- Region served: Global
- Key people: John Bucher, PhD, executive director Joanna Gardner, PhD, managing director Stephanie Zajchowski, PhD, director of operations Bradley Olson, PhD, directions of publications
- Website: www.jcf.org

The Joseph Campbell Foundation (JCF) is a US not-for-profit organization dedicated to the work of influential American mythologist Joseph Campbell (1904–1987). The organization's stated mission is to "invite you to experience the power of myth." JCF fosters academic and popular discussion in the fields of comparative mythology and religion, psychology and culture through its publishing program, events, social media outreach, and website.

In 1990, Campbell's longtime editor Robert Walter and Campbell's widow, choreographer Jean Erdman, created the foundation.

JCF’s initiatives include:

- The Collected Works of Joseph Campbell, a series of books and recordings (both previously released and posthumously)
- MythMaker Podcast Network which contributes original podcasts such as Pathways with Joseph Campbell and The Podcast with a Thousand Faces
- Weekly MythBlast series of essays by contemporary mythologists
- Campbell's personal library and papers housed at the OPUS Archives and Research Center (see below) and the New York Public Library (see below)
- the Erdman Campbell Award
