= List of story structures =

A story structure, narrative structure, or dramatic structure (also known as a dramaturgical structure) is the structure of a narrative work such as a book, play, or film. There are different kinds of narrative structures worldwide, which have been hypothesized by critics, writers, and scholars over time. This article covers the range of dramatic structures from around the world: how the acts are structured and what the center of the story is supposed to be about widely varies by region and time period.

== Africa and African diaspora ==
=== Caribbean ===
==== Kwik Kwak ====
The Kwik Kwak (also called as crick crack) structure involves three elements: the narrator, the protagonist, and the audience. The story itself is considered a performance so there is a synergy among the aforementioned elements. In the story, the narrator may draw attention to the narrative or to himself as storyteller. The structure often includes the following:

1. Tell riddles to test the audience.
2. Audience becomes a chorus and comments on the story.

Usually there is a ritual ending.

=== West Africa ===
==== Griot ====
A story structure commonly found in West Africa told by Griot storytellers, who tell their stories orally. Famous stories from this tradition include Anansi folktales. This storytelling type had influence on later African American, Creole, and Caribbean African diaspora stories.

The story structure is as follows:

1. Opening formula – includes jokes and riddles to engage audience participation. Then a solemn beginning.
2. The body/expository section – narration of the tale, setting up the characters and the events, defining the conflict, with storyteller singing, dancing, shouting and inviting the audience to join. The storyteller uses a language full of images and symbolism.
3. The conclusive formula – closure of the story and the moral.

The central driver of the story is memory. The griot or the storyteller relies on collective knowledge and can perform several functions such as educator, counselor, negotiator, entertainer, and custodian of the collective memory.

== Indigenous peoples of North America and Latin America ==
=== Central America ===
==== Robleto ====
Robleto is a story form that originates from Nicaragua. It is named after Robert Robleto, though the structure is much older than him and discovered by Cheryl Diermyer, an outsider, in 2010. It is made of:

1. Line of Repetition
2. Introduction
3. Climax
4. Journeys
5. Close

=== South America ===
==== Harawi ====
Harawi is an ancient traditional genre of Andean music and also indigenous lyric poetry. Harawi was widespread in the Inca Empire and now is especially common in countries that were part of it, mainly: Peru, Ecuador, and Bolivia. Typically, harawi is a moody, soulful, slow and melodic song or tune played on the quena (flute). The words of harawi speak of love (often unrequited), the plight of ordinary peasants, privations of orphans, etc. Melodies are mainly in minor pentatonic scale.

== Asia ==
=== East Asia ===
==== Dream diary (Japan) ====
Dream diaries (夢記 ゆめのき) is separate from the Dream record and was started by Buddhist monks in 13th-century Japan, who recorded their dreams in diaries. These dreams were often recorded, shared and viewed.

==== Dream record ====
This is a story type that starts with a dream. It was invented in the Ming Dynasty and exported to Korea. The structure deals mainly with a character either reflecting on their life or telling another dead character about their life. It often reflects regret from the characters about their life choices and helps them to either move on or accept their reality. It was never imported into Japan because Japan had an anti-Chinese sentiment in the Tokugawa era starting in the 1600s and the collapse of the Ming empire was in 1618.

==== East Asian 4-act ====
This dramatic structure started out as a Chinese poetry style called qǐ chéng zhuǎn hé (起承转合) and then was exported to Korea as gi seung jeon gyeol (Hangul: 기승전결; Hanja: 起承轉結) and Japan as kishōtenketsu (起承転結). Each country has adapted their own take on the original structure.

==== Eight-legged essay ====
The eight-legged essay (Chinese: 八股文; pinyin: bāgǔwén; lit. 'eight bone text') was a style of essay in imperial examinations during the Ming and Qing dynasties in China. The eight-legged essay was needed for those test takers in these civil service tests to show their merits for government service, often focusing on Confucian thought and knowledge of the Four Books and Five Classics, in relation to governmental ideals. Test takers could not write in innovative or creative ways, but needed to conform to the standards of the eight-legged essay. Various skills were examined, including the ability to write coherently and to display basic logic. In certain times, the candidates were expected to spontaneously compose poetry upon a set theme, whose value was also sometimes questioned, or eliminated as part of the test material. This was a major argument in favor of the eight-legged essay, arguing that it were better to eliminate creative art in favor of prosaic literacy. In the history of Chinese literature, the eight-legged essay is often said to have caused China's "cultural stagnation and economic backwardness" in the 19th century.

==== Jo-ha-kyū ====
Jo-ha-kyū (序破急) is a concept of modulation and movement applied in a wide variety of traditional Japanese arts. Roughly translated to "beginning, break, rapid", it essentially means that all actions or efforts should begin slowly, speed up, and then end swiftly. This concept is applied to elements of the Japanese tea ceremony, to kendō and other martial arts, to dramatic structure in the traditional theatre, and to the traditional collaborative linked verse forms renga and renku (haikai no renga).

The concept originated in gagaku court music, specifically in the ways in which elements of the music could be distinguished and described. Though eventually incorporated into a number of disciplines, it was most famously adapted, and thoroughly analysed and discussed by the great Noh playwright Zeami, who viewed it as a universal concept applying to the patterns of movement of all things.

=== West Asia ===
==== Chiastic structure ====
A kind of structure found in the Torah, Bible and Quran using a form of repetition.

==== Hakawati ====
A Palestinian form of literature which includes 1001 Arabian Nights. This structure also includes are many religious works, including the Torah, Bible, and Quran.

==== Karagöz ====
Karagöz (literally Blackeye in Turkish) and Hacivat (shortened in time from "Hacı İvaz" meaning "İvaz the Pilgrim", and also sometimes written as Hacivad) are the lead characters of the traditional Turkish shadow play, popularized during the Ottoman period and then spread to most nation states of the Ottoman Empire. It is most prominent in Turkey, Greece, Bosnia and Herzegovina and Adjara (autonomous republic of Georgia). In Greece, Karagöz is known by his local name Karagiozis; in Bosnia and Herzegovina, he is known by his local name Karađoz.

Karagöz plays are structured in four parts:

- Mukaddime: Introduction. Hacivat sings a semai (different at each performance), recites a prayer, and indicates that he is looking for his friend Karagöz, whom he beckons to the scene with a speech that always ends "Yar bana bir eğlence" ("Oh, for some amusement"). Karagöz enters from the opposite side.
- Muhavere: dialogue between Karagöz and Hacivat
- Fasil: main plot
- Bitiş: Conclusion, always a short argument between Karagöz and Hacivat, always ending with Hacivat yelling at Karagöz that he has "ruined" whatever matter was at hand and has "brought the curtain down," and Karagöz replying "May my transgressions be forgiven."

==== Ta'ziyeh ====
Ta'ziyeh is an Iranian Shi'ite Muslim ritual that reenacts the death of Husayn ibn Ali (the Islamic prophet Muhammad's grandson) and his male children and companions in a brutal massacre on the plains of Karbala, Iraq in the year 680 AD. His death was the result of a power struggle in the decision of control of the Muslim community after the death of Muhammad.

== Europe and the European diaspora ==
=== Aristotle's analysis ===
Many scholars have analyzed dramatic structure, beginning with Aristotle in his Poetics (c. 335 BCE).

In his Poetics, a theory about tragedies, the Greek philosopher Aristotle put forth the idea the play should imitate a single whole action and does not skip around (such as flashbacks). "A whole is what has a beginning and middle and end. A beginning is that which is not a necessary consequent of anything else but after which something else exists or happens as a natural result. An end on the contrary is that which is inevitably or, as a rule, the natural result of something else but from which nothing else follows; a middle follows something else and something follows from it. Well constructed plots must not therefore begin and end at random, but must embody the formulae we have stated." (1450b27). He split the play into two acts: δέσις (desis) and λύσις (lysis) which roughly translates to binding and unbinding, though contemporary translation is "complication" and "dénouement". He mainly used Sophocles to make his argument about the proper dramatic structure of a play.

He argues that for a proper tragedy the plot should be simple: a man moving from prosperity to tragedy and not the reverse. It should excite pity or fear, to shock the viewer. He also states that the man needs to be well-known to the audience. The tragedy should come about because of a flaw in the character.

Aristotle ranks the elements of a tragedy, in order of importance, as follows: Plot, Character, Events (or "Reason": the rationale for the actions that occur), Diction, Music, and Spectacle. And that all plays should be able to be performed from memory, long and easy to understand. He was against character-centric plots stating "The Unity of a Plot does not consist, as some suppose, in its having one man as its subject." He was against episodic plots. He held that discovery should be the high point of the play and that the action should teach a moral that is reinforced by pity, fear and suffering. The spectacle, not the characters themselves would give rise to the emotions. The stage should also be split into "Prologue, Episode, Exode, and a choral portion, distinguished into Parode and Stasimon..."

Unlike later, he held that the morality was the center of the play and what made it great. Unlike popular belief, he did not come up with the three act structure popularly known.

=== One-act play ===
Said to be innovated by Euripides for his play Cyclops, it wasn't wildly popular until the late 19th century with the rise of film. Alice Guy-Blaché made a comment about it in the documentary Be Natural: The Untold Story of Alice Guy-Blaché, where she commented that many of the films of the time required a quick punchline at the end.

It is still used today, but fell out of popular favor for films around the late 1930s to 1940s, when the runtime for an average film became longer. (See Kenneth Rowe and Lajos Egri.)

=== Horace's analysis ===
The Roman drama critic Horace advocated a 5-act structure in his Ars Poetica: "Neue minor neu sit quinto productior actu fabula" (lines 189–190) ("A play should not be shorter or longer than five acts"). He also argued for a Chorus, "The Chorus should play an actor's part, energetically," and the center of the play should be morality as Aristotle did.

"It should favour the good, and give friendly advice,
Guide those who are angered, encourage those fearful
Of sinning: praise the humble table's food, sound laws
And justice, and peace with her wide-open gates:
It should hide secrets, and pray and entreat the gods
That the proud lose their luck, and the wretched regain it."

He did not specify the contents of the acts.

=== Aelius Donatus ===
The fourth-century Roman grammarian Aelius Donatus in his criticism of Terence's plays Adelphoe and Hecyra in the book Aeli Donati qvod fertvr Commentvm Terenti: Accendvnt Evgravphi Volume 2 and in his review of Terence's Play Andria in P. Terentii Afri comoediae sex used the terms prologue (prologus), protasis, epitasis and catastropha. He often uses the original Greek letters, but does not define these as specific acts, but as parts of the play as having different emotional qualities.

For example for Terence's play Adelphoe he comments, "in hac prologus aliquanto lenior inducitur; magis etiam in se purgando quam in aduersariis laedendis est occupatus. πρότασις turbulenta est, ἐπίτασις clamosa, καταστροφή lenior. quarum partium rationem diligentius in principio proposuimus, cum de comoedia quaedam diceremus." which roughly translates to, "In this the prologue is somewhat milder; he is more engaged in clearing himself than in injuring his opponents. Protasis is turbulent. The epitasis is loud and gentler catastropha."

He further adds that Hecyra, "in hac prologus est et multiplex et rhectoricus nimis, propterea quod saepe exclusa haec comoedia diligentissima defensione indigebat. atque in hac πρότασις turbulenta est, ἐπίτασις mollior, lenis καταστροφή." which roughly translate to, "In this the prologue is both multiple and overly rhetorical, because oftentimes this comedy is excluded because it needs a very careful defense. And in this the protasis is turbulent, the milder the epithasis, the softer the catastropha."

However, he also argues that Latins have a five act chorus, which distinguishes Latins from Greeks, "hoc etiam ut cetera huiusmodi poemata quinque actus habaeat necesse est choris diusos a Graecis poetis." which roughly translates to, "In order to have other poems of this kind, it is necessary to have five acts of choruses, distinguished from the Greek poets." making it fairly clear that though he used the Greek for these divisions of play, he did not think of them as part of the overall act structure.

No definitive translation of this work has been made into English.

=== Picaresque novel ===
Born in Spain in the 16th century, the picaresque novel is a type of narrative told in the first person by a lowborn protagonist ("pícaro") in a realistic setting, often with a satiric tone. Plot and character development is limited. Famous examples are Lazarillo de Tormes and Mateo Alemán's Guzmán de Alfarache.

=== Shakespeare and the Renaissance ===
William Shakespeare did not invent the five-act structure. The five-act structure was made by Gustav Freytag, in which he used Shakespeare as an example. There are no writings from Shakespeare on how he intended his plays to be. There is some thought that people imposed the act structure after his death. During his lifetime, the four-act structure was also popular and used in plays such as Fortunae Ludibrium sive Bellisarius. Freytag made claims in his book that Shakespeare should have used his 5 act structure, but it did not exist at the time period of Shakespeare.

It is argued by Richard Levin that during the Renaissance, multiple plots became far more popular, deviating from Aristotle's singular linear plot model. Robert Coltrane further argues that the plot structure of the time period was done in foils, with often comedies with a serious plot and then several comedic and outlandish plots around it.

=== Bildungsroman ===
The term was coined in the 1819 by Karl Morgenstern, but the birth of the Bildungsroman is normally dated to the publication of Wilhelm Meister's Apprenticeship by Johann Wolfgang von Goethe in 1795–96, or, sometimes, to Christoph Martin Wieland's Geschichte des Agathon of 1767.

The plot requires a young or innocent protagonist who goes on to learn about the world, and learns how to enter it. The central goal is maturity of the protagonist which may be done through discovery, conflict or other means.

=== Freytag's pyramid ===
Freytag's pyramid

The German playwright and novelist Gustav Freytag wrote Die Technik des Dramas, a definitive study of the five-act dramatic structure, in which he laid out what has come to be known as Freytag's pyramid. Under Freytag's pyramid, the plot of a story consists of five parts:

1. Introduction (later renamed Exposition by Rev. Jesse Ketchum Brennan)
2. Rise
3. Climax
4. Return or Fall
5. Catastrophe Freytag is indifferent as to which of the contending parties justice favors; in both groups, good and evil, power and weakness, are mingled.

A drama is then divided into five parts, or acts, which some refer to as a dramatic arc: introduction, rise, climax, return or fall, and catastrophe. Freytag extends the five parts with three moments or crises: the exciting force, the tragic force, and the force of the final suspense. The exciting force leads to the rise, the tragic force leads to the return or fall, and the force of the final suspense leads to the catastrophe. Freytag considers the exciting force to be necessary but the tragic force and the force of the final suspense are optional. Together, they make the eight component parts of the drama.

He argued for tension created through contrasting emotions, but didn't actively argue for conflict. He argued that character comes first in plays. He also sets up the groundwork for what would later in history be called the inciting incident.

Overall, Freytag argued the center of a play is emotionality and the best way to get that emotionality is to put contrasting emotions back to back. He laid some of the foundations for centering the hero, unlike Aristotle. He is popularly attributed to have stated conflict at the center of his plays, but he argues actively against continuing conflict.

==== Introduction ====
The setting is fixed in a particular place and time, the mood is set, and characters are introduced. A backstory may be alluded to. Introduction can be conveyed through dialogues, flashbacks, characters' asides, background details, in-universe media, or the narrator telling a back-story.

==== Rise ====
An exciting force begins immediately after the exposition (introduction), building the rise in one or several stages toward the point of greatest interest. These events are generally the most important parts of the story since the entire plot depends on them to set up the climax and ultimately the satisfactory resolution of the story itself.

==== Climax ====
The climax is the turning point, which changes the protagonist's fate. If things were going well for the protagonist, the plot will turn against them, often revealing the protagonist's hidden weaknesses. If the story is a comedy, the opposite state of affairs will ensue, with things going from bad to good for the protagonist, often requiring the protagonist to draw on hidden inner strengths.

==== Return or Fall ====
During the Return, the hostility of the counter-party beats upon the soul of the hero. Freytag lays out two rules for this stage: the number of characters be limited as much as possible, and the number of scenes through which the hero falls should be fewer than in the rise. The return or fall may contain a moment of final suspense: Although the catastrophe must be foreshadowed so as not to appear as a non sequitur, there could be for the doomed hero a prospect of relief, where the final outcome is in doubt.

==== Catastrophe ====
The catastrophe (Katastrophe in the original) is when the hero meets his logical destruction. Freytag warns the writer not to spare the life of the hero. Despite the term "dénouement" being attested as first appearing in 1752, it was not used to refer to dramatic structure until the 19th century and not specifically used by Freytag for this section of the act structure.

=== Selden Lincoln Whitcomb ===
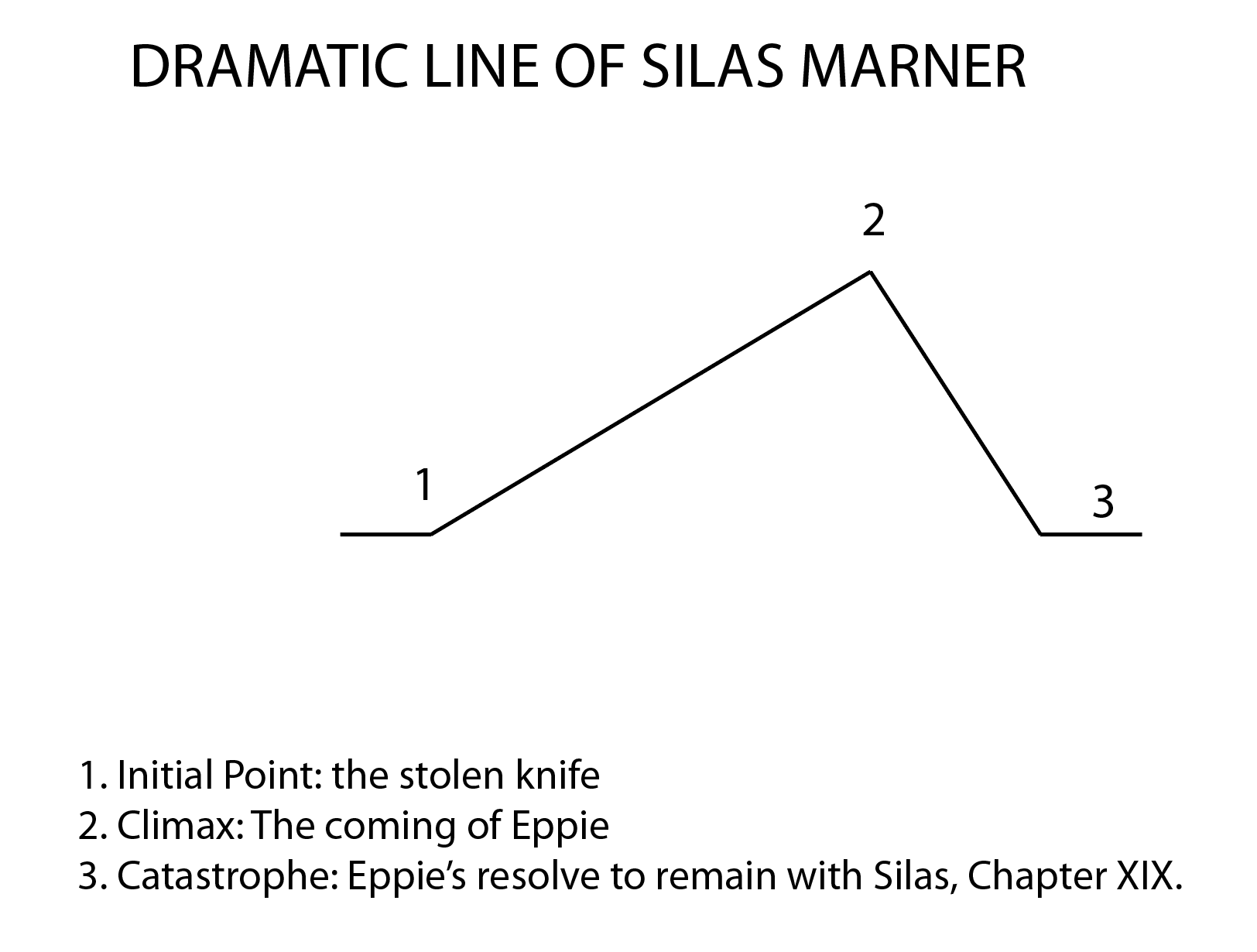
A diagram of Silas Marner on page 58 of Selden Whitcomb's The Study of a Novel.

In 1905, Selden Lincoln Whitcomb published The Study of a Novel, and suggested that graphical representation of a novel was possible. "The general epistolary structure may be partially represented by a graphic design." For which he posts a proposed design for Miss. Burney Evelina on page 21.

He expounds this idea on Page 39 with "The Line of Emotion" where he proposes how one feels about emotion can be drawn graphically. However, he makes a careful distinction between author, character and reader. "The fact that the author presents a character moved by fear does not necessarily mean that the author or the reader experiences that emotion. Nor does a mere discussion of emotion, whether by the author or a character such as one should notice in the study of subject-matter, belong to the line of emotion." He argued that this line of emotion should be calculated for the reader. He draws a diagram for Silas Marner Chapter XIII to illustrate his point.

He does not prescribe a certain formula for the structure, but instead introduces various kinds of vocabulary for various points along the emotional line.

His work was then used in Joseph Berg Esenwein to describe short stories for the line of emotion, though his name is misspelled in Esenwein's work. His diagram specifically for Silas Marner was plagiarized later by Kenneth Rowe, though he drew other diagrams for other novels and forms, such as Pride and Prejudice on page 58, the Epistolary Form p 21, Simple narratives p 56, and so on.

=== Shaggy Dog Story ===
The Shaggy Dog story is usually a long anecdote that terminates in an Anticlimax (narrative). The coinage of the term starts in May 1937, though the form might have existed before then. Including one story from 1919. Often the teller of the story, as it gets more and more ridiculous, swears the story is true. Similar to, but not the same as a Tall tale.

=== Joseph Berg Esenwein ===
Joseph Berg Esenwein in 1909 published, "Writing the short-story; a practical handbook on the rise, structure, writing, and sale of the modern short-story." In it he outlines the following plot elements and ties it to a drawing, following Whitcomb's prescriptions: Incident, emotion, crisis, suspense, climax, dénouement, conclusion. He does not make an accompanying diagram with any of these elements, but does argue that the line of emotion is important to stories on page 198. He also lists types of plots on page 76 as: Surprise, Problem, Mystery, Mood or Emotion or Sentiment, Contrast and Symbolism. He does not argue one to be superior to the other. He cautions multiple times in his text that his prescriptions are only for short stories such as pages 30–32.

Chapter X, Part 5. Climax he defines here as, "the apex of interest and emotion; it is the point of the story." when quoting "Short Story Writing 1898, Charles Raymond Barrett, p 171" but further expounds here as, "rise of interest and in power to its highest point." He argues the highest point is always along emotional lines on page 187 stating, "The big thing--at once the basic and the climacteric thing--in the short story is human interest, and there can be no sustained human interest without emotion. The whole creation is a field for its display, and since fiction assumes to be a microcosm, fiction, short and long must deal intimately with emotion, from its gentler to its extreme manifestations."

The definitions he used would later influence the vocabulary for the Hollywood Formula. Early Hollywood films were short. For example In Old California published in 1910 is 17 minutes long.

=== Rev. Jesse Ketchum Brennan ===
Rev. J.K. Brennan wrote his essay "The General Design of Plays for the book 'The Delphian Course'" (1912) for the Delphian Society. For the essay, he describes what the diagram and the play of Antigone look like. He outlines eight parts of a play which are:

1. The Exposition: This part tells what has happened before the stage action begins. The audience is made acquainted with the setting of the play, its atmosphere, the characters, and their social positions.
2. The Turn of the Play: The action of one or more of the characters which sets the course of events moving towards the crisis or climax.
3. The Steps of Action, leading to climax (sometimes called Rising Action): A. B. C. etc.
4. The Decisive Point of Action. Something takes place which makes it impossible for the "rising action" to go further. Affairs must take a new direction.
5. The Falling Action, leading from the climax.
6. The Final Lift, something which checks the downward action; a new problem arises.
7. The Catastrophe, or Dénouement.
8. The End, or the result of the catastrophe

This is the first time that Catastrophe and Dénouement are called the same thing. No references to other works are given in the essay.

=== Clayton Hamilton ===
Clayton Hamilton, in A Manual of The Art of Fiction (1918), stated that a proper plot outline is, "A plot, therefore, in its general aspects, may be figured as a complication followed by an explication, a tying followed by an untying, or (to say the same thing in French words which are perhaps more connotative) a nouement followed by a dénouement."

He does not state the center of stories is conflict, but rather on page 3 that, "The purpose of fiction is to embody certain truths of human life in a series of imagined facts." and centers on the debate of the time between romanticism and realism.

The complication is what Lajos Egri later called the premise and it was later pushed to be part of the inciting incident. The explication was put first and then explained to be the introduction in the contemporary vocabulary. The dénouement would be split later into falling action and conclusion.

=== Confessional writing ===
Sprung originally from Christianity, it is often an account of a person's life that was first secularized by Jean Jacques Rousseau and then popularized in 1919 with the magazine True Story. The confessions don't really have to be valid, though an account of someone's life needs to be included. Such confessions magazines were chiefly aimed at an audience of working-class women. Their formula has been characterized as "sin-suffer-repent": The heroine violates standards of behavior, suffers as a consequence, learns her lesson, and resolves to live in light of it, not embittered by her pain.

=== Percy Lubbock ===
Percy Lubbock wrote The Craft of Fiction, which was published in 1921.

The aim of Lubbock is to give a shape or a formula to books, because he states: "We hear the phrase on all sides, an unending argument is waged over it. One critic condemns a novel as 'shapeless,' meaning that its shape is objectionable; another retorts that if the novel has other fine qualities, its shape is unimportant; and the two will continue their controversy till an onlooker, pardonably bewildered, may begin to suppose that "form" in fiction is something to be put in or left out of a novel according to the taste of the author. But though the discussion is indeed confusingly worded at times, it is clear that there is agreement on this article at least—that a book is a thing to which a shape is ascribable, good or bad."

He also argued for "Death of the Author" somewhat in his work, "The reader of a novel—by which I mean the critical reader—is himself a novelist; he is the maker of a book which may or may not please his taste when it is finished, but of a book for which he must take his own share of the responsibility. The author does his part, but he cannot transfer his book like a bubble into the brain of the critic; he cannot make sure that the critic will possess his work. The reader must therefore become, for his part, a novelist, never permitting himself to suppose that the creation of the book is solely the affair of the author."

He is the first to make a concentrated effort at looking at conflict as the center of "drama" and therefore stories, "What is the story? There is first of all a succession of phases in the lives of certain generations; youth that passes out into maturity, fortunes that meet and clash and re-form, hopes that flourish and wane and reappear in other lives, age that sinks and hands on the torch to youth again—such is the substance of the drama. The book, I take it, begins to grow out of the thought of the processional march of the generations, always changing, always renewed; its figures are sought and chosen for the clarity with which the drama is embodied in them." He directly mentions conflict when referring to the plot of War and Peace with analyzing Madame Bovary and so on.

The book was wildly, popular, but Virginia Woolf privately wrote of the work that, "This is my prime discovery so far; & the fact that I've been so long finding it, proves, I think, how false Percy Lubbock's doctrine is--that you can do this sort of thing consciously." in November 1923. She went back and forth on the work throughout her life.

=== Kenneth Thorpe Rowe ===
In 1939, Kenneth Thorpe Rowe published Write That Play in which he outlined what he thought of his ideal play structure. He did not cite any sources, though there looks to be some influence from Freytag's Pyramid.

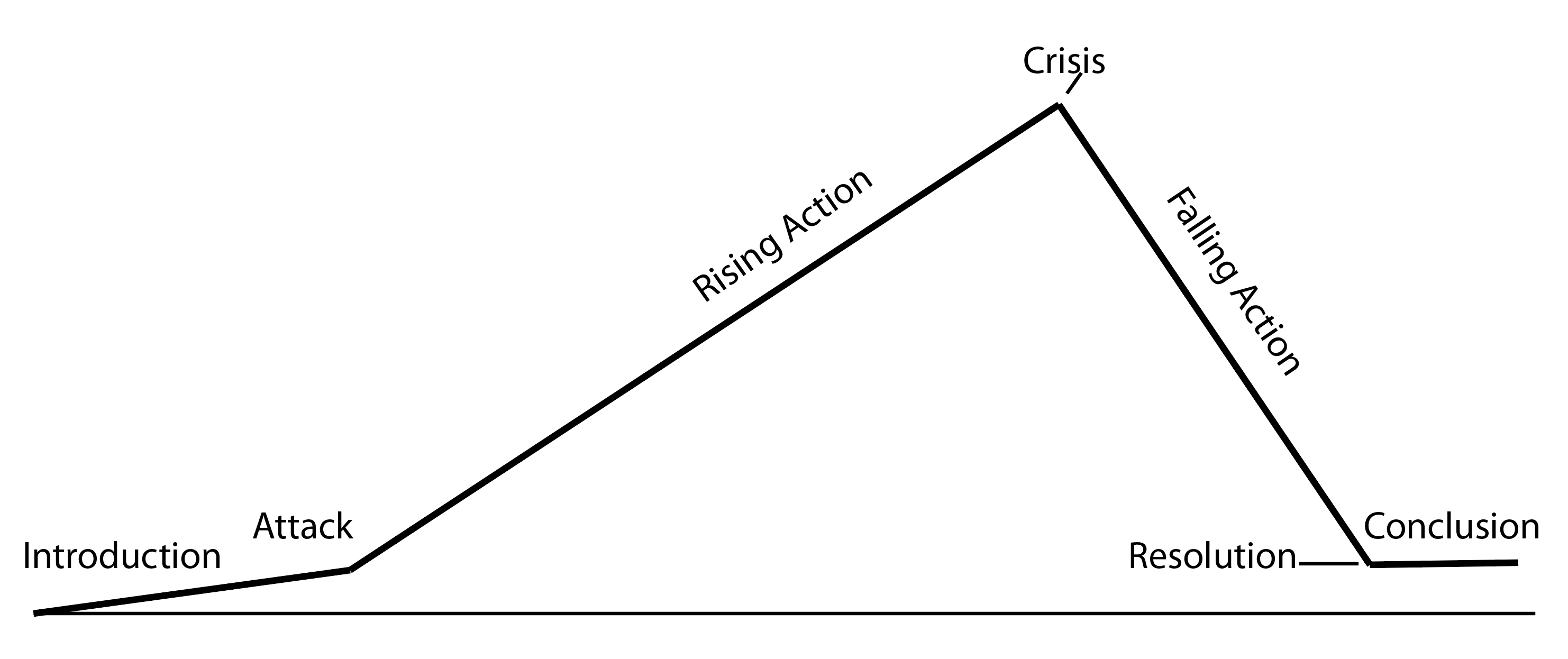
Kenneth Rowe's Basic Dramatic Structure from page 60 of Write That Play.

The parts are: introduction, attack, rising action, crisis, falling action, resolution, conclusion. The attack would be relabeled the "inciting incident" later and the crisis would be relabeled "climax" and the conclusion as the "dénouement" by Syd Field. The resolution as a turning point was also taken out. The center of the play should be, according to him, conflict as this will excite the most emotion.

He acknowledges other people have used climax, but does not cite who, but objects to the term "climax" because, "Climax is misleading because it might with equal fitness be applied to the resolution. Climax applied to the turning point suggests increasing tension up to that point, and relaxation following it. What actually happens is that the tension continues to increase in a well con-structured play from the turning point to the resolution, but is given a new direction and impetus at the turning point."

Despite this being his ideal shape for a play, he suggests that this can be modified to include more complications on the Rising action or the Falling action. He further suggests that the play structure doesn't need a conclusion. However, if there is a conclusion, he suggests making it shorter than the Introduction and it can either be flat or acute in angle.

This story structure, as suggested, had a strong influence on Arthur Miller (All My Sons, Death of a Salesman).

=== Lajos Egri ===
In his book The Art of Dramatic Writing, published 1946, Lajos Egri argued for more look inside of character's minds and that character generates conflict, which generates events. He cites Moses Louis Malevinsky's The Science of Playwriting and The Theory of Theater by Clayton Hamilton. Unlike previous works he cites from, he emphasized the importance of premise to a play.

He is also far more interested in looking at character creating conflict and events, than events shaping characters. He states this by arguing for different kinds of conflict: Static, jump and rise. These in turn can also be an attack or counterattack. He argues that Rising conflict is the best at revealing character.

He also examines character through the lens of physiology, sociology and psychology.

His work influenced Syd Field, who went on to make the 3-act Hollywood formula.

=== Syd Field ===
A visual representation of the three-act structure.

Syd Field in 1979 published Screenplay: The Foundations of Screenwriting. He outlined that the structure of the play should be:

Act I contains the setup. It is approximately the first quarter of a screenplay, and reveals the main character, premise, and situation of the story.

Act II contains the confrontation. It lasts for the next two quarters of the screenplay, and clearly defines the main goal of the protagonist.

Act III contains the resolution. This is the final quarter of the screenplay. This answers the question as to whether or not the main character succeeded in his or her goal.

He outlined in the 2005 edition of his book Foundations of a Screenplay, that he wanted to give a more set structure to the work that Lajos Egri had laid out.

He was the first to really coin the Three Act model as a formal model for screenplays.

=== Theatre of the Absurd ===
Critic Martin Esslin coined the term in his 1960 essay "The Theatre of the Absurd", which begins by focusing on the playwrights Samuel Beckett, Arthur Adamov, and Eugène Ionesco. Esslin says that their plays have a common denominator — the "absurd", a word that Esslin defines with a quotation from Ionesco: "absurd is that which has not purpose, or goal, or objective." The French philosopher Albert Camus, in his 1942 essay "Myth of Sisyphus", describes the human situation as meaningless and absurd.

Plot-wise it often undercuts the conflict in the story and mocks the human condition. It often lacks any formal plot structure. Often nothing really gets resolved.

=== Television story arcs ===
Although soap operas had been telling serialized stories since the 1950s, television multiple-episode story arcs in prime time were not popular in the U.S. until 1981, with the introduction of Hill Street Blues. Prior to that, episodes could be shifted in order without audience confusion. Multiple-episode story arcs took off in the 1990s, with many of the popular television shows employing them. Xena: Warrior Princess, Hercules: The Legendary Journeys, Boy Meets World, and Batman: The Animated Series all had story arcs.

=== Northrop Frye's dramatic structure ===
The Canadian literary critic and theorist Northrop Frye analyzes the narratives of the Bible in terms of two dramatic structures: (1) a U-shaped pattern, which is the shape of a comedy, and (2) an inverted U-shaped pattern, which is the shape of a tragedy.

==== A U-shaped pattern ====
"This U-shaped pattern . . . recurs in literature as the standard shape of comedy, where a series of misfortunes and misunderstandings brings the action to a threateningly low point, after which some fortunate twist in the plot sends the conclusion up to a happy ending." A U-shaped plot begins at the top of the U with a state of equilibrium, a state of prosperity or happiness, which is disrupted by disequilibrium or disaster. At the bottom of the U, the direction is reversed by a fortunate twist, divine deliverance, an awakening of the protagonist to his or her tragic circumstances, or some other action or event that results in an upward turn of the plot. Aristotle referred to the reversal of direction as peripeteia or peripety, which depends frequently on a recognition or discovery by the protagonist. Aristotle called this discovery an anagnorisis—a change from "ignorance to knowledge" involving "matters which bear on prosperity or adversity". The protagonist recognizes something of great importance that was previously hidden or unrecognized. The reversal occurs at the bottom of the U and moves the plot upward to a new stable condition marked by prosperity, success, or happiness. At the top of the U, equilibrium is restored.

A classic example of a U-shaped plot in the Bible is the Parable of the Prodigal Son in Luke 15:11–24. The parable opens at the top of the U with a stable condition but turns downward after the son asks the father for his inheritance and sets out for a "distant country" (Luke 15:13). Disaster strikes: the son squanders his inheritance and famine in the land increases his dissolution (Luke 15:13–16). This is the bottom of the U. A recognition scene (Luke 15:17) and a peripety move the plot upward to its dénouement, a new stable condition at the top of the U.

==== An inverted U-shaped structure ====
The inverted U begins with the protagonist's rise to a position of prominence and well-being. At the top of the inverted U, the character enjoys good fortune and well-being. But a crisis or a turning point occurs, which marks the reversal of the protagonist's fortunes and begins the descent to disaster. Sometimes a recognition scene occurs where the protagonist sees something of great importance that was previously unrecognized. The final state is disaster and adversity, the bottom of the inverted U.

=== Contemporary ===
Contemporary dramas increasingly use the fall to increase the relative height of the climax and dramatic impact (melodrama). The protagonist reaches up but falls and succumbs to doubts, fears, and limitations. The negative climax occurs when the protagonist has an epiphany and encounters the greatest fear possible or loses something important, giving the protagonist the courage to take on another obstacle. This confrontation becomes the classic climax.

In her 2019 book, Meander, Spiral, Explode: Design and Pattern in Narrative, novelist and writing teacher Jane Alison criticized the conflict-climax-resolution structure of narrative as "masculo-sexual," and instead argues that narratives should form around various types patterns; for example, those found in nature, from which her "Meander, Spiral, Explode" structure was inspired.

== See also ==
- Frame story
- Narrative structure
- Narrative transportation
- Rule of three (writing)
- Scene and sequel
