= Denouement =

Element of story structure

Denouement (UK: /deɪˈnuːmɒ̃, dɪ-/, US: /ˌdeɪnuːˈmɒ̃/) is an element in the structure of many stories, in which all plot lines typically resolve, the major conflict ends or diminishes, events are explained, etc. It is thus often called the resolution of a story. It usually immediately follows the climax. The term is borrowed from the French word dénouement (French: [denumɑ̃]) derived from Old French desnouer 'to untie' which is from Latin nodus 'knot'.

In the terminology of classical drama the final resolution is traditionally called catastrophe.

Various authors suggest different taxonomies of the story structure. In particular, it is common to include the "falling action" between the climax and the denouement (see "List of story structures"). A denouement may be followed by a conclusion and an epilogue, which may give a moral of the story, outline subsequent events ("lived happily ever after"), etc. Alternatively, Henry Albert Philips (1912) includes the denouement in the "conclusion".

Short stories, with their economy of words, often do not need an elaborate denouement.

Typically a denouement is at the end of the narrative, but it may also start the story, acting as a teaser. Usually a denouement follows the logic of the course of the events, but sometimes it may be unmotivated, what is called "deus ex machina", as in some ancient Greek tragedies of Sophocles or Euripides.

Another common type of a denouement is a happy ending.
