= Screenplay (disambiguation) =

A Screenplay is a written plan for a film or television program.

Screenplay may also refer to:

- Screenplay (book), the bestselling manual on screenwriting by Syd Field, 1979
- Screen Play (blog), an Australian videogame culture blog
- ScreenPlay, a British TV series (1986–1993)
- Screen pass, a kind of play in North American football
- Screenplay Film Festival, held annually in Lerwick, Shetland
