= Act (drama) =

Division or unit of a drama

An act is a major division or unit of drama, including plays, films, operas, ballets, or musicals, itself consisting of one or more minor divisions called scenes. An act can be a conscious division placed within a work by a playwright (usually itself made up of multiple scenes) or a unit of analysis for dividing a dramatic work into sequences. The word act can also be used for major sections of other entertainment, such as variety shows, television programs, music hall performances, cabaret, and literature.

== Scenes ==
An act is a part of a play defined by elements such as rising action, climax, and resolution. A scene normally represents actions happening in one place at one time and is marked off from the next scene by a curtain, a blackout, or a brief emptying of the stage.

The elements that create the plot of a play and divide it into acts include the exposition, which sets up the rest of the story by giving basic information. Another element is the inciting incident, which starts all the action that will follow. Going along with the inciting incident, the major dramatic question is formed, which holds the rest of the play. The majority of the play is made up of complications, which change the action. These complications lead to the crisis, which is the final plot point. At this point, the major dramatic question is usually answered. Finally, the play culminates with a resolution, or the dénouement, where everything comes together and the situation has been resolved. These elements of the plot are the main things used to divide a play into acts and sometimes scenes. In some scenarios, the play may not end with a resolved situation; it may leave the audience on a peak and have a sequel to it, otherwise known as a cliffhanger.

Though there is no limit to the number of acts in a dramatic work, some may have been derived from different interpretations of Aristotle's Poetics, in which he stresses the primacy of plot over character and "an orderly arrangement of parts", and others may have been derived from Freytag's Pyramid.

== History ==
Roman theatre divided plays into a number of acts separated by intervals. Acts may be further divided into scenes. In classical theater, each regrouping between the entrances and exits of actors is a scene, while later use describes a change of setting.

Modern plays often have only one level of structure, which can be referred to as either scenes or acts at the whim of the writer, and some writers dispense with firm divisions entirely. Successive scenes are normally separated from each other in either time or place, but the division between acts has more to do with the overall dramatic structure of the piece. The end of an act often coincides with one or more characters making an important decision or having an important decision to make, a decision that has a profound impact on the story being told.

Contemporary theatre, in line with screenwriting and novel forms, tends towards a three-act structure. Many operettas and most musicals are divided into just two acts, so, in practice, the intermission is seen as dividing them, and the word act comes to be used for the two-halves of a show whether or not the script divides it into acts.

== Varieties ==
=== One-act plays ===
A one-act play is a short drama that consists of only one act; the phrase is not used to describe a full-length play that does not utilize act-divisions. Unlike other plays which usually are published one play per book, one-act plays are often published in anthologies or collections.

=== Three-act plays ===
In a three-act play, each act usually has a different mood. In the most commonly used structure, the first act has many introductory elements (that is, who, what, when, where, why, and how); the second act is usually the darkest, with the antagonists having a greater compass; and the third act has a resolution (dénouement), often with the protagonists prevailing.

- Act one: The conflict of the story is discovered. The exposition, the introduction of the protagonist and other characters that the protagonist meets, take place, as well as the dramatic premise and inciting incident (the incident that sets the events of the story in motion) occurs approximately halfway through the first act.
- Act two: The main character encounters an obstacle that prevents the character from achieving his or her dramatic need. This is known as the complication. The main character reaches his or her lowest point, seems farthest from fulfilling the dramatic need or objective, and seems to have no way to succeed.
- Act three: The climax occurs as well as the resolution (dénouement), a brief period of calm at the end of a play where a state of equilibrium returns.

=== Five-act plays ===
Until the 18th century, most plays were divided into five acts. The work of William Shakespeare, for example, generally adheres to a five-act structure. This format is known as the five-act play, and was famously analyzed by Gustav Freytag in Die Technik des Dramas (Dramatic techniques). The five acts played specific functions in the overall structure of the play similar to that of Freytag's pyramid.

- Act One: Exposition and inciting incident
- Act Two: First major turning point and progressive complications
- Act Three: Rising action and climax
- Act Four: Falling action
- Act Five: Resolution (For tragedies, a catastrophe is added before it.)

A similar five-part structure is also used in traditional Japanese Noh drama, particularly by Zeami Motokiyo. Zeami, in his work Sandō (The Three Paths), originally described a five-part (five dan) Noh play as the ideal form. It begins slowly and auspiciously in the first part (jo), building up the drama and tension in the second, third, and fourth parts (ha), with the greatest climax in the third dan, and rapidly concluding with a return to peace and auspiciousness in the fifth dan (kyū).
