= Character arc =

Process of dynamic characters' transformation

A character arc is the transformation or inner journey of a character over the course of a story. If a story has a character arc, the character begins as one sort of person and gradually transforms into a different sort of person in response to changing developments in the story. Since the change is often substantive and leading from one personality trait to a diametrically opposite trait (for example, from greed to benevolence), the geometric term arc is often used to describe the sweeping change. In most stories, lead characters and protagonists are the characters most likely to experience character arcs, although lesser characters often change as well. A driving element of the plots of many stories is that the main character seems initially unable to overcome opposing forces, possibly because they lack skills or knowledge or resources or friends. To overcome such obstacles, the main character must change, possibly by learning new skills, to arrive at a higher sense of self-awareness or capability. Main characters can achieve such self-awareness by interacting with their environment, by enlisting the help of mentors, by changing their viewpoint, or by some other method.

== Dramatic narrative structure ==
Throughout the trajectory of narratives with a tripartite structure, character arcs often unfold beside the narrative arc in the following way:

=== First act ===
During the first act, the character arc is established or re-established for at least one character, the main character (the protagonist), within the exposition of the environment including relationships to other characters. Later in the first act, a dynamic, on-screen incident, known as the inciting incident, or catalyst occurs that confronts the protagonist, whose attempts to deal with this incident lead to a second and more dramatic situation, known as the first turning point. After the first turning point, life will never be the same for the protagonist and raises a dramatic question that will be answered in the climax of the story. The dramatic question should be framed in terms of the protagonist's call to action, for example, Will X recover the diamond? Will Y end up with their love interest? Will Z capture the killer?

=== Second act ===
During the second act, also referred to as "rising action", the character arc develops as the protagonist attempts to resolve the problem initiated by the first turning point, only to discover ever-worsening situations, which often lead to the learning of new skills, the discovery of capabilities, and (sometimes late in the second act if at all) the raising of self-awareness.

=== Third act ===
During the third act, including the climax, "falling action" and resolution (denouement), the narrative arc is completed although the character arc typically is not. During the climax, because the main tensions of the story are brought to their most intense point and the dramatic question is answered, a character arc reaches a place where the character gains a new sense of who they are becoming. As the plot and its subplots resolve, the character arc's emphasis shifts from the learning of any new skills or the discovery of dormant capabilities to the awakening of a higher level of self-awareness, which in turn changes who the character is becoming.

== Examples ==
=== In literature ===
Some examples include:

- Shakespeare's Hamlet sees the eponymous character, once a young scholarly prince full of promise, quickly becoming a melancholic brooder after his father's death. The play shows his slow but deadly fall.
- In Dostoevsky's Crime and Punishment, the protagonist Raskolnikov commits a murder that leads him on a path of redemption and, after an intense inner struggle, he realizes that he needs to be punished for his actions, reporting himself to the authorities.
- Victor Hugo's Les Misérables includes a myriad of characters that transform against the backdrop of social events. Jean Valjean starts as a selfish, violent convict and develops into a generous and loving father to Cosette, who in turn transforms from an abused, lonely and somewhat secluded child to a beautiful and caring woman.
- Ursula Le Guin's protagonist from her A Wizard of Earthsea quartet gradually changes from an impulsive and arrogant youth to a stoic and wise man, reconciling the darkness within and all the bad actions it had caused.

=== In film ===
Some examples include:

- In Tootsie, Dustin Hoffman's character begins as a misogynistic chauvinist but, when he is forced to play the part of a woman, he also experiences a change in how he views women and becomes a different character by the end.
- In Empire of the Sun, Jim begins as a carefree young boy. After the Japanese take over Shanghai and he is separated from his family, he is forced to suffer trauma because of the war.
- In The Godfather (1972), widely regarded as one of the greatest films ever made, Michael Corleone initially wants nothing to do with the crime business of his father, Don Vito Corleone. However, after Vito is critically wounded in an assassination attempt, Michael gradually becomes more involved in a war of retribution against those responsible. This, effectively and ironically, sets him down the path to becoming Don of the Corleone crime syndicate. Its acclaimed sequel, The Godfather Part II (1974), chronicles Michael's effective fall from grace as a result of attaining that status.
- In Taxi Driver (1976), Travis Bickle degenerates from a somewhat disturbed, highly disorganized Vietnam War veteran into an obsessive psychotic.
- In Goodfellas (1990), Henry Hill (played by Ray Liotta) goes from being a suave and sophisticated gangster to a paranoid nervous wreck due to a severe cocaine addiction.
- In The Lion King (1994), Simba changes from a naïve cub to a wise and compassionate king.
- In Frozen, Elsa begins the film embracing her ice powers. After injuring her sister, Anna, she becomes scared of her powers and considers herself a monster. After her sister sacrifices herself, Elsa finally embraces her powers again. Anna begins the movie as a social butterfly willing to throw herself into any man's arms; by the end, she has learned that first appearances are sometimes false and is more mature and cautious about her relationships.
- In Spider-Man (2002), Peter Parker begins as a shy, awkward, but intelligent teen who is bitten by a radioactive spider and uses his new powers to impress his childhood crush, Mary Jane Watson. But after his Uncle Ben is murdered, Peter grows into a mature young adult and uses his powers responsibly to help people by remembering his uncle's advice that "with great power comes great responsibility". The acclaimed sequel, Spider-Man 2 (2004), chronicles Peter struggling with the responsibility of being a superhero and helping others by sacrificing his own happiness until it takes a toll on his relationships with his best friend Harry Osborn and MJ. Due to his lack of confidence, he begins to lose his powers and eventually gives up and discards his costume. However, after his Aunt May reminds him that heroes exist in everyone to give people strength and nobility, Peter resumes his role, his powers return. He remembers his aunt's philosophy that "To do what is right, we must be steady and give up the thing we want the most—even our dreams." Doc Ock's humanity is restored, and at the end, Peter is rewarded with a relationship with Mary Jane.
- In Thor: Ragnarok, the Hulk begins a story arc dealing with accepting himself as one person rather than seeing Bruce Banner as a separate entity. It continues in Avengers: Infinity War and concludes in Avengers: Endgame.

=== In television ===
Like a story arc, which often is composed of many narrative arcs, the character arc is not confined within the limits of one narrative. The character arc may extend over to the next story, a sequel, or another episode. In episodic TV series, the character arc functions as a narrative hook that writers often use to ensure viewers continue watching.

- The TV series Desperate Housewives made heavy use of character arcs throughout its run, with story arcs (or mysteries, as the show was famed for) normally being used to move the plot along in the background, as the four protagonists, Susan Mayer, Lynette Scavo, Bree Van de Kamp, and Gabrielle Solis, dealt with their various foibles and flaws, through the eyes of their dead friend and neighbor, Mary Alice Young.
- Over the course of the television series Xena: Warrior Princess, Gabrielle starts from a young, idealistic Greek farm girl to becoming a warrior, and in the end, she becomes Xena's successor.
- In the television series Buffy the Vampire Slayer, multiple characters go through a substantial character arc. Buffy Summers goes from being a valley girl who wants to escape her destiny to being a warrior committed to her destiny. Willow Rosenberg goes from being a shy, bookish girl to the world's most powerful witch and becomes comfortable with her sexuality. Cordelia Chase begins as a typical shallow valley girl but gradually matures into a heroic young woman. Rupert Giles begins the show as a stereotypical stuffy British bookworm, but gradually becomes a father figure to Buffy and by the end of the show realizes that he must leave in order for her to become an adult.
- Lost focuses on character arcs for each of the survivors of a plane crash. Jack Shephard changes from a man of science to a man of faith, accepting his role as both the leader of the survivors and eventually at the end of the series, the protector of the island. James "Sawyer" Ford changes from a selfish con-man to a mature leader. John Locke is devoted to the island because of his belief that it healed his paralysis but gradually this love grows into fanaticism.
- Smallville focuses on character arcs for each of its main characters as they progress into their Superman comic book identities. Clark Kent's arc revolved around the gradual acceptance of his destiny and becoming a hero. The series also tracks Lex Luthor's progression into darkness and Lois Lane's emulation of her cousin Chloe as she becomes a hardened journalist. Other characters have their eventual character arc alluded to but never explicitly defined or realized onscreen, such as Perry White's rise to editor of the Daily Planet and Lex Luthor's ascension to President of the United States. As well as individual characters, there are arcs involving many characters which intertwine to tell about the formation of the Justice League.
- In Breaking Bad, Walter White begins as a timid and mild-mannered high school chemistry teacher who, following a terminal lung cancer diagnosis, becomes a producer and distributor of methamphetamine in order to secure his family's financial future before he dies. As Walter becomes more involved in the drug trade, his character develops from a morally responsible and unassuming family man into a manipulative, power-hungry and violent drug lord. Jesse Pinkman begins the series as a typical drug-dealing slacker and wannabe gangster, but as the show goes on, he becomes less and less comfortable with the criminal lifestyle as it takes a toll on his relationships and is no longer able to accept the horrors he's been a part of. By the end of the show, he becomes a changed man who has empathy and whose talents have been realized by the people around him.
- In Pretty Little Liars, Mona Vanderwaal goes from being the first major villain ("A") to an unexpected heroine. Mona was "Loser Mona," always humiliated by Alison. She becomes the main antagonist, manipulating and harassing the Liars. After being discovered, she starts collaborating with the protagonists, using her intelligence to defeat A.
- In The 100, Octavia Blake goes from being a rebellious and marginalized teenager to becoming the feared antagonist under the alias Blodreina, and finally to a leader seeking redemption.
- In The Walking Dead, Carol Peletier is considered by many fans to be the character with the most impressive evolution: she goes from being a submissive and abused woman to one of the strongest, most strategic, and complex survivors in the series.
- Game of Thrones shows numerous examples of complete character arcs. Daenerys Targaryen transforms from a naive young girl to a queen and a conqueror, only to fall from grace after a misuse of power. The character of Jon Snow undergoes a similar arc in embracing the need to govern and rule, and metaphorically "kills the boy and lets the man be born", only to be banished after a misuse of power.
- My Little Pony: Friendship is Magic has numerous examples of character arcs. Twilight Sparkle evolves from an isolated bookwork to an educator of friendship and by the end of the series the ruler of Equestria. Fluttershy begins the series as a shy and timid pony but gradually becomes more assertive and overcomes her fears. Rainbow Dash begins the series as an arrogant show off but evolves into a loyal and dedicated Wonderbolt.

== See also ==
- Act (drama)
- Characterization
- Dynamic character
- Peripeteia
