= Falling action =

Falling action the sequence of events that take place between a story's climax and resolution.

- Falling action, analysed as part of a three-act structure
- Falling action, analysed by Gustav Freytag as part of a five-act structure
