= Conflict (narrative) =

Literary element of challenge that stands in the way of a goal

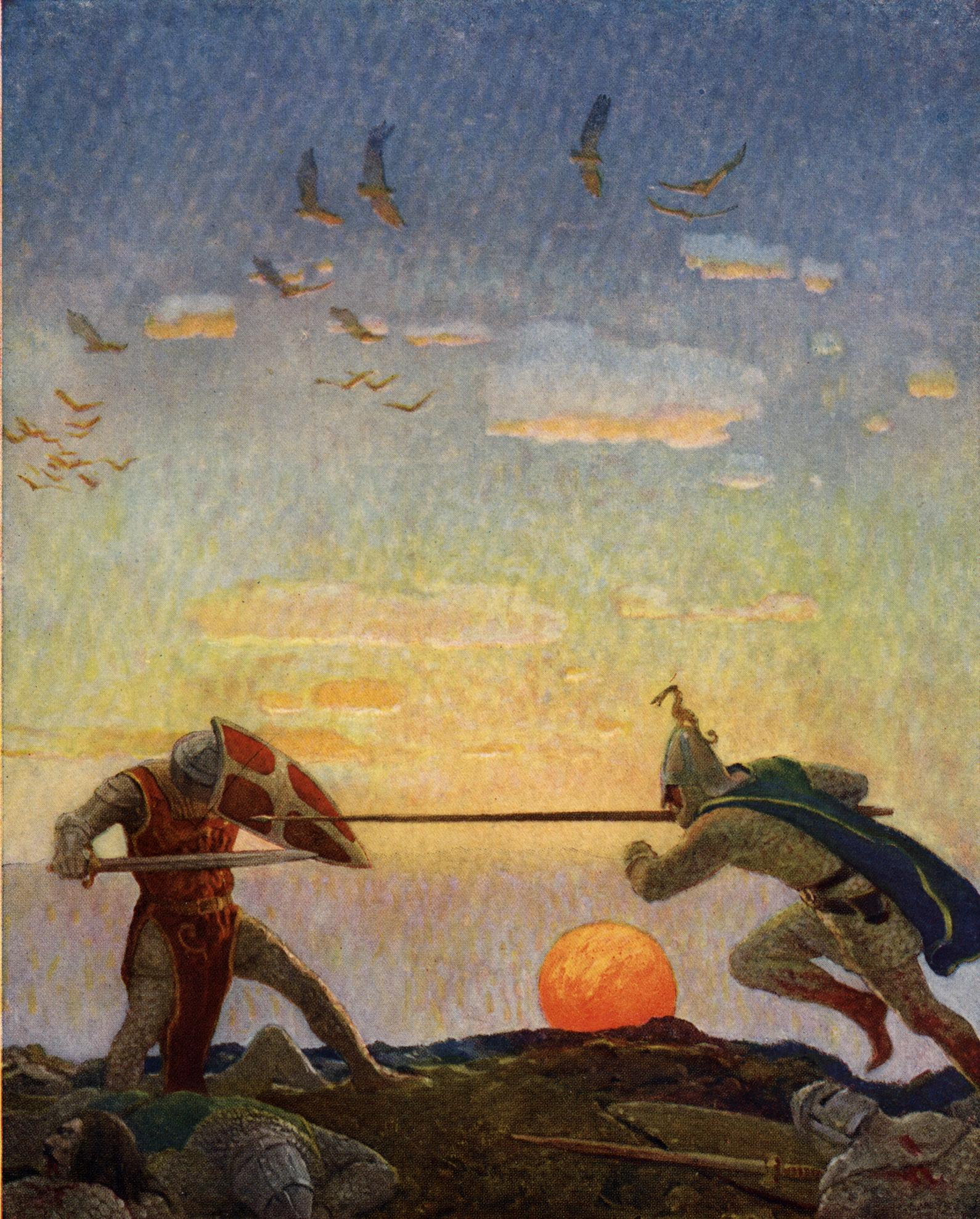
Conflict in narrative comes in many forms. "Man versus man", such as is depicted here in the battle between King Arthur and Mordred, is particularly common in traditional literature, fairy tales and myths.

Conflict is a major element of narrative or dramatic story structure, wherein opposing forces create challenges that introduce uncertainty and/or delay to if and when characters will achieve their goals. Conflict may also serve as a motivation for characters to take action.

The modern theory of literary conflict developed in European and European diaspora literature starting in the 20th century. It is often applied to other stories, framing them as centering around one or more conflicts, though that may or may not have been the intent of the author.

== Basic nature ==
A purpose of conflict is to create tension in the story, making readers more interested by leaving them uncertain which of the characters or forces will prevail.

There may be multiple points of conflict in a single story, as characters may have more than one desire or may struggle against more than one opposing force. When a conflict comes to a resolution and the reader discovers which force or character succeeds, it creates a sense of closure. Conflicts may resolve at any point in a story, particularly where more than one conflict exists, but stories do not always resolve every conflict. If a story ends without resolving the main or major conflict(s), it is said to have an open ending, which can serve to ask the reader to consider the conflict more personally, and may not satisfy them, but obvious conflict resolution may also leave readers disappointed in the story.

Conflict may be internal or external—that is, it may occur within a character's mind or between a character and exterior forces. External conflict is most visible between two or more characters, usually a protagonist and an antagonist/enemy/villain, but can also be against nature or something else.

== Classification ==
The basic types of conflict in fiction have been commonly codified as "man versus man", "man versus nature", and "man versus self." Although frequently cited, these three types of conflict are not universally accepted. Sometimes a fourth basic conflict is described, "man versus society". Some of the other types of conflict referenced include "man versus machine" (The Terminator, Brave New World), "man versus fate" (Oedipus Rex), "man versus the supernatural" (The Shining) and "man versus God" (A Canticle for Leibowitz).

=== Man versus nature ===
"Man versus nature" originally came from the "Nature versus nurture" argument, which was credited to be pioneered in the European canon by philosopher John Locke's An Essay Concerning Human Understanding (1690). The coinage came from Victorian polymath Francis Galton, the modern founder of eugenics and behavioral genetics when he was discussing the influence of heredity and environment on social advancement. Galton was influenced by On the Origin of Species written by his half-cousin, the evolutionary biologist Charles Darwin.

This debate eventually became part of the social sciences milieu in the 20th century. With questions about it put forth in particularly sociology with the introduction of conflict theory by Lester F. Ward favoring more nature and the father of anthropology, Franz Boas. He outlined his theory in The Mind of Primitive Man (1911) established a program that would dominate American anthropology for the next 15 years. In this study, he established that in any given population, biology, language, material, and symbolic culture, are autonomous; that each is an equally important dimension of human nature, but that none of these dimensions is reducible to another.

This debate might have jumped to writing with Ayn Rand, a fiction writer and a philosopher, who argued that "man versus nature" is not a conflict because nature has no free will and thus can make no choices. Though she argued against it, she still mentioned it as a possibility.

The conflict in this explanation is imaged as an external struggle positioning the character versus an animal or a force of nature, such as a storm or tornado or snow. The "man versus nature" conflict is central to Ernest Hemingway's The Old Man and the Sea, where the protagonist contends versus a marlin. It is also common in adventure stories, including Robinson Crusoe. The TV show Man vs. Wild takes its name from this conflict, featuring Bear Grylls and his attempts to survive nature.

=== Man versus man ===
"Man versus man" conflict involves stories where characters are versus each other. This is an external conflict. The conflict may be direct opposition, as in a gunfight or a robbery, or it may be a more subtle conflict between the desires of two or more characters, as in a romance or a family epic. This type of conflict is very common in traditional literature, fairy tales and myths. One example of the "man versus man" conflict is the relationship struggles between the protagonist and the antagonist stepfather in This Boy's Life. Other examples include Dorothy's struggles with the Wicked Witch of the West in The Wonderful Wizard of Oz and Tom Sawyer's confrontation with Injun Joe in The Adventures of Tom Sawyer.

=== Man versus self ===
With "man versus self" conflict, the struggle is internal. A character must overcome their own nature or make a choice between two or more paths—good and evil; logic and emotion. A serious example of "man versus himself" is offered by Hubert Selby Jr.'s 1978 novel Requiem for a Dream, which centers around stories of addiction. In the novel Fight Club by Chuck Palahniuk, published in 1996, as well as in its 1999 film adaptation, the unnamed protagonist struggles versus himself in what is revealed to be a case of dissociative identity disorder. Bridget Jones's Diary also focuses on internal conflict, as the titular character deals with her own neuroses and self-doubts.

=== Man versus society ===
Sometimes a fourth basic conflict is described, "man versus society". Where man stands versus a man-made institution (such as slavery or bullying), "man versus man" conflict may shade into "man versus society". In such stories, characters are forced to make moral choices or frustrated by social rules in meeting their own goals. The Handmaid's Tale, The Man in the High Castle and Fahrenheit 451 are examples of "man versus society" conflicts. So is Charlotte's Web, in which the pig Wilbur fights for his survival versus a society that raises pigs for food.

== History ==
As with other literary terms, these have come about gradually as descriptions of common narrative structures. Conflict was first described in ancient Greek literature as the agon, or central contest in tragedy. According to Aristotle, in order to retain interest, the hero must have a single conflict. The agon, or act of conflict, involves the protagonist (the "first fighter") and the antagonist (a more recent term), corresponding to the hero and villain. The outcome of the contest cannot be known in advance, and according to later critics such as Plutarch, the hero's struggle should be ennobling.

Conflict, as a concept about literature, and centering it as a driver for character motivation and event motivation mainly started with the introduction of conflict theories in the 19th century. It moved to literature with Percy Lubbock in Craft of Fiction in 1921. He spends the majority of his treaties on fiction arguing past stories were all about conflict, particularly Leo Tolstoy's War and Peace, though it was previously classed as a morality tale, using what would later be coined in 1967 as The Death of the Author, as his main literary theory. He mainly focused on conflict in events, rather than in characters.

This later gained traction with the introduction of characters having conflicts, with Lajos Egri's work on character throughout his body of instructive manuals on writing. He attempted to apply the idea of psychology to characters using mainly Sigmund Freud. Freud also drew heavily from ideas of conflict from Friedrich Nietzsche. Nietzsche's idea about conflict are often cited by his soft readers as promoting agons, or a measured mode of struggle, as a cornerstone.

Though this work has been attributed to Aristotle's Poetics, Aristotle himself did not promote conflict as a major force in narrative works. He argued for morality through pity and fear being the main point of the tale. This error was mainly because of Syd Field's Screenplay: The Foundations of Screenwriting where he invokes Aristotle's name in his arguments about conflict.

By the time of the 1980s, conflict was considered a cornerstone of all fiction, though this was not true in the 19th century. The 19th century had morality tales, realism, absurdism, etc. All previous literature was often retconned to be about conflict, and argued into being about conflict, even if contemporaries didn't say it was. The main targets of this were often Shakespeare and Aristotle.

In the 1980s conflict was justified, rather than with conflict theory, with saying that it added interest to the story. The idea is that conflict brings tension to the story. The theory is tension adds interest.

Bertolt Brecht didn't think that conflict was the point of the plot, but conflict should be a starting point to a point of transformation, of uplift to transform the whole point of theater into being about fun. He was known for hating Aristotle, commenting: "[B]y Aristotle's definition the difference between the dramatic and epic forms was attributed to their different methods of construction."

Still there were critics of the idea that stories were all about conflict well into the 1980s, which mainly came from women, such as Jean Mandler and Nancy S. Johnson who argued for development as the center of stories. There were equal complaints from people of color that conflict didn't reflect what they thought story was about, such as Utako K. Matsuyama, and Toni Morrison, who commented to Charlie Rose that she didn't base Beloved around conflict, but that for her, it was about memory. Griots, who tell stories in West Africa, are a core source for memory of the history for their tribes.

== See also ==
- Deus ex machina
- Mythos (Aristotle)
- Theme (narrative)
- Kishotenketsu
