= April Soetarman =

American architect and designer

April Soetarman is an artist, architect, and designer who creates public art, installations, interactive narratives, and "weird side projects". She is originally from the Bay Area, California and is based in Brooklyn, New York for her work. She graduated from UC Berkeley in 2012 with a double major in Architecture and Music.

== Work ==
Soetarman used to work at Studio 07 the Experience Design and Environmental Graphics Design studio. Here, she focuses on installation, curation, and storytelling as her prime topics to make art and technology for the built environment to exhibit designs that inform, persuade, delight, and inspire. She operates under the semi-anonymous moniker WeirdSideProjects.com which she describes as an experiment in code, text, street art, food, and feelings. She displays her work focused on creating moments of delight through tactical urban trouble-making, immersive installations, or online media. Her goal is to invoke memory and emotion through her art and has worked with firms across the United States on an extensive range of projects varying from exhibit design to large-scale public art and sound art installations to achieve this. She was a finalist in the 2021 Interaction Awards for her "The End of the Day" project.

== Notable work ==
Soetarman is known for creating street signs with messages on them. For example, these street signs include messages like "'NOTICE: I never stopped loving you. I hope you're well'" as well as "CAUTION: Beware of unreliable narrators" plus many others. In 2016, Soetarman started this as a personal, Seattle-based project. She was motivated to create these signs to further explore different artistic avenues and to cope with personal struggles.

Another notable project of Soetarman's is "The End of the Day." "The End of the Day" is a calming, listening activity that takes place over the phone. The recording reflects with a listener on time and sunsets within 10 minutes. To participate, she has attached plaques with a phone number and instructions to different New York City benches.

Finally, Soetarman created the "Museum of Almost Realities." This museum exhibit considers events that could have happened in one's life had the person made different decisions.
