= Protasis =

Introductory part of a play

In drama, the protasis is the introductory part of a play, usually its first act.

The fourth-century Roman grammarian Aelius Donatus analyzed plays as being made of three parts: the protasis, where characters are introduced and the premise is defined; the epitasis, the main action, which develops the plot; and the catastrophe, the resolution of the plot.

This corresponds to the three-act structure in modern dramatic theory, where the three acts are the exposition, the rising action, and the dénouement.
