= The Gadget Maker =

Novel by Maxwell Griffith

First edition (publ. J. B. Lippincott & Co.)

The Gadget Maker is a 1954 novel by Maxwell Griffith. It is notable for its vivid depiction of an otherwise-rarely-described milieu: campus life at MIT in the 1940s. It also presents a striking engineers-eye-view of guided missile development at a West Coast aerospace firm during the early days of the cold war.

On its appearance, The New York Times described The Gadget Maker as "the story of a misguided zealot devoted body and soul to the advancement of knowledge" and called it "an absorbing narrative [and] a clear presentation of technological subject-matter, written with stylistic ease and fluidity by an author who is himself a graduate of the Massachusetts Institute of Technology."

== Synopsis ==
The novel traces the life of Stanley Brack, captivated by model aircraft as a child. He enters MIT, and in a memorable scene, is interviewed by the head of the School of Aeronautical Engineering, a legendary German aerodynamicist. His main concern is unexpected. "From your hair and general coloring," he said slowly, "I thought you might perhaps be Jewish." Brack reassures him that he and both his parents are Baptists and of Scots-Irish descent. "We have to be careful," the professor confides; "The aircraft industry is one of the few they haven't managed to take over yet," and congratulates Stanley on his acceptance into the course. The incident turns out to be one of many in which Brack swallows any thought of protest and goes along to get along.

After graduation, he joins Amcraft, the Amalgamated Aircraft Corporation, in Los Angeles. It is a manufacturer of aircraft components that is just about to unveil its first complete airplane, a transport. The company is run personally by Dave Humbler, "president, founder of the company, chief engineer—big wheel number one. Real nice guy, Dave," a colleague explains. (Resemblances can be seen to the Douglas Aircraft Company.) Brack rises through the ranks and grows with the company.

After the war Amcraft acquires the services of Gunther Rausch, "a spoil of war" and a rocket expert from Peenemünde. His presence gives the company an edge in picking up missile work.

Rausch is brilliant but arrogant and Brack detests him. Nevertheless, as the book draws to a climax, he makes common cause with him in an effort to perfect a guided missile. Brack is the project manager, and the project is in trouble and behind schedule. He pressures a friend and colleague into conducting some dangerous rocket tests with Rausch. Rausch is tense and jittery and gives coworkers an impression that he is concealing personal inexperience in conducting such tests. There is an explosion, and Brack's friend Sim suffers terrible injuries: physical and chemical burns and lung damage that leaves him close to death.

Brack's fiancée, a witness, tells Brack that Rausch was panicky during the test and "never stopped fiddling with the switches... he was like some hot-head whose car won't start but who keeps on turning the ignition switch." She thinks Rausch could have caused the explosion (a concern which ultimately turns out to be unfounded). Brack furiously argues with Rausch, then debates with his superior about the project's future and who should lead it. Brack convinces his superior to let him continue as leader. As the discussion closes, his superior says "Okay, it's all settled." But he adds "One other thing—I'm firing the girl." Brack's protest sticks in his throat; "ashamed, he looked at his feet, and then he nodded."

The book closes with Brack and Rausch standing together literally arm in arm, watching the conclusion of a successful missile test. "Did you see it, Gunther?" Brack says. "Yah," breaths Rausch, "Just like a star. A shooting star." "And we made it," says Brack, proudly, as the tale ends.

The New York Times reviewer says that "the question arises... whether Brack is to be regarded as an all-wool idealist pursuing heroically his destiny despite any and all distractions tossed in his way. Or is he a less desirable type, possessed of the ability to abandon all pretense to ethical conduct in his ambitious pursuit after self-advancement?"

Although the Times calls it an "absorbing narrative," to a modern reader much of the interest lies, not in the broad story outline, but in the dozens of little details and circumstantial touches which bring times, places, and situations—not well documented elsewhere—to life.

== Quotations ==
- At night, floodlights glare from artfully concealing shrubbery and lave the main building with a white light that emphasizes black-trimmed, three-story windows rising in uninterrupted, eye-leading verticals toward a dominant, austere dome mimicked from some classic pile of ancient Rome.
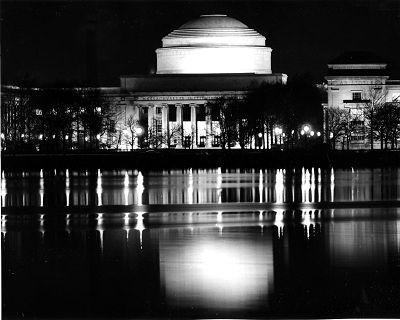
  MIT's Great Dome
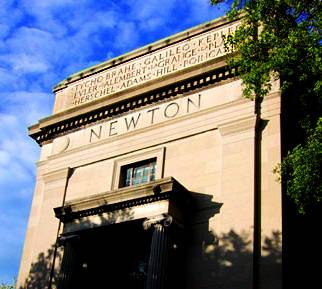
  Newton tower
  On every slab-sided cornice, like proclamations of faith needing no explanation, are chiseled Darwin, Newton, Aristotle and, in lesser letters, the names of the more numerous Lavoisiers and Eulers and Faradays who have discovered the chemical elements or evolved the equations or stumbled upon the fundamentals of nature. Indeed, not unlovely is the breeding ground of technicians and engineers which, as announced in stone above great, fluted columns, is the MASSACHVSETTS INSTITVTE OF TECHNOLOGY.
- "What do you expect from me—miracles!" Rausch demanded angrily. "Do you expect me to build an engine—" he snapped his fingers—"like so? I am a scientist, not a magician! To develop a new engine you must haf an organization that can supply the test benches with one experimental engine after the other. You must make, break and remake engines until you get one that works."
