= Catastasis =

Fourth part of ancient dramas

In classical tragedies, the catastasis (pl. catastases) is the fourth part of an ancient drama, in which the intrigue or action that was initiated in the epitasis, is supported and heightened, until ready to be unravelled in the catastrophe. It also refers to the climax of a drama.

In rhetoric, the catastasis is that part of a speech, usually the exordium, in which the orator sets forth the subject matter to be discussed.

The term is not a classical one; it was invented by Scaliger in his Poetics (published posthumously in 1561). It "is more or less equivalent to the summa epitasis of Donatus and Latomus and to what Willichius sometimes called the extrema epitasis," and was first used in 1616 in England.

== See also ==
Apocatastasis
