= Plot point =

Significant event within a plot

In television and film, a plot point is any incident, episode, or event that "hooks" into the action and spins it around into another direction.

== Three-act structure ==
Noted screenwriting teacher Syd Field discusses plot points in his paradigm, popularized in his book Screenplay: The Foundations of Screenwriting (1979). He proposes that a well-structured movie has two main plot points within a three-act structure.

The first major plot point occurs 20–30 minutes into the film (assuming a standard 120-minute running time), and the second major one occurs 80–90 minutes into the film. The first plot point ends Act I and propels the story into Act II; similarly, the second plot point ends Act II and propels the story into the final act, Act III.

== Description ==
Plot points serve an essential purpose in the screenplay. They are a major story progression and keep the story line anchored in place. Plot points do not have to be big dynamic scenes or sequences. They can be quiet scenes in which a decision is made.

A plot point is whatever the screenwriter chooses it to be. It could be a long scene or a short one, a moment of silence or of action. It simply depends upon the script being written. It is the choice of the screenwriter, but it is always an incident, episode, or event dictated by the needs of the story. There are many plot points in a screenplay, but the ones that anchor the story line in place are plot points I and II.

When the screenplay is completed, it may contain as many as 10–15 plot points, most of which will be in Act II. How many the screenplay has depends upon the story. The purpose of a plot point is to move the story forward, toward the resolution.

== See also ==
- Screenwriting theories
