= Aelius Donatus =

Fourth century Roman grammarian and teacher of rhetoric

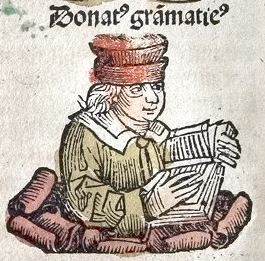
from Nuremberg Chronicle

Aelius Donatus (English: /doʊˈneɪtəs/; fl. mid-fourth century AD) was a Roman grammarian and teacher of rhetoric, whose works on Latin grammar were very widely used in the teaching of Latin during the Middle Ages. His Ars minor was the standard elementary introduction to grammar during that period.

== Biography ==
He is known to have once taught Jerome, an early Christian Church father who is most known for his translation of the Bible into Latin, known as the Latin Vulgate. Newer revisions of the Vulgate are still in common use by the Catholic Church.

While Aelius Donatus authored both commentaries and a biography of Virgil, he should not be confused with Tiberius Claudius Donatus, also the author of a commentary (Interpretationes) on the Aeneid, who lived about 50 years later.

== Works ==
=== Grammar ===
He was the author of a number of professional works, of which several are extant:

- Grammatical works (sometimes) referred to together as Ars grammatica:
  - Ars maior, with the full title Donati Grammatici Urbis Romae Ars Grammatica – A treatise on Latin grammar.
  - Ars minor, also known as Donati De Partibus Orationis Ars Minor – A treatise on the Latin parts of speech.

While these concise works were not very original, they were extremely popular as school books in the introductory teaching of Latin during the Middle Ages. They were also printed in very large quantities after the introduction of the printing press. Ars minor in particular has been described as 'the leading grammar textbook' and 'by far the most commonly used grammar' between 400 AD and 1500. Ars maior was not as dominant in its niche as Ars minor, because it was rivalled by Priscian's Institutes of Grammar. Ars maior discusses letters, syllables, metrical feet, punctuation and the parts of speech. It then continues with the subjects of faults and perfections in language, poetic licence and figures of rhetoric. It uses many citations, especially from Virgil.

Donatus was a proponent of an early system of punctuation, consisting of dots placed in three successively higher positions to indicate successively longer pauses, roughly equivalent to the modern comma, colon, and full stop. This system remained current through the seventh century, when a more refined system created by Isidore of Seville gained prominence.

=== Commentaries ===
- Commentvm Terenti, Publii Terentii Comoediae Sex with preface de tragoedia et comoedia (Commentary on Terence, Six Comedies of Terence with the preface About Tragedies and Comedies) – A commentary on the playwright Terence and all six of his plays, probably compiled from other commentaries. The preface is a commentary on the "proper" structures of Tragedies and Comedies by Donatus titled, "About Comedies and Tragedies." It has never been translated to English as parts are missing from the original manuscript. It has partially been translated to German. In "About Comedy and Tragedy" in his Commentary on Terence, Donatus was the first person known to document the system whereby a play is made up of three separate parts: protasis, epitasis, and catastrophe.
- Explicatio in Ciceronis De inventione (An Explanation of the Cicero's De Inventione)
- Vita Vergili (Life of Virgil) is thought to be based on a lost Vita by Suetonius, together with the preface and introduction of his commentary on Virgil's works. A greatly expanded version of Servius's commentary exists, however, which is supplemented with frequent and extensive extracts from what is thought to be Donatus's commentary on Virgil.
  - Since the book is supposedly based on a Vita by Suetonius, it is also often titled Vita Suetonii vulgo Donatiana ["The Life [of Virgil], [actually] by Suetonius, [but] commonly called 'by Donatus'"], or Vita Suetoniana-Donatiana.

== Donatus auctus ==
During the Renaissance, Donatus's Vita Vergili is often collected in anthologies of ancient literature. The humanists had interpolated other materials into the Vita Vergili to add details and fill in gaps, and these interpolations are collectively called Donatus auctus ["the augmented Donatus"]. Donatus auctus was added some time around 1426–37, between the first and second redactions of the De scriptoribus illustribus latinae linguae ["On Famous Writers of the Latin Language"] of Sicco Polenton, and it became the standard account of Virgil's life up until the 18th century.

The text and translation is found in Ziolkowski and Putnam (2008: II.A.37, 345–69), with italics for the Donatus auctus and non-italics for Vita Vergili.

See for an evolutionary tree for all the versions of Vita Vergili.

This Vita depicted Vergil as a wise scholar and expert in science, while disregarding the anecdotes portraying Vergil as a magician, which were added during the medieval period in other Vitae.

Donatus auctus contains one oft-quoted poem "sic vos non vobis", which was recorded in Codex Salmasianus. See section 251, 252 in I.1 of Latin Anthology (B. G. Teubner, 1982). The version recorded in Codex Salmasianus contained just two lines; it was expanded into 5 lines in Donatus auctus.

== Editions ==
- Keil, Heinrich & Mommsen, Theodor (1864). Grammatici latini vol. IV / Probi Donati Servii / qui feruntur de arte grammatica libri / ex recensione Heinrici Keilii / notarum laterculi ex recensione Theodori Mommseni. Lipsia: B. G. Teubnerus.
- Chase, Wayland Johnson (1926). The Ars minor of Donatus : for one thousand years the leading textbook of grammar translated from the Latin, with introductory sketch. Madison: University of Wisconsin.
- Holtz, Louis (1981). Donat et la tradition de l’enseignement grammatical: Étude sur l’Ars Donati et sa diffusion (IVe-IXe siècle) et édition critique [Donatus and the tradition of grammatical teaching: A study of the Ars Donati and its dissemination (4th-9th centuries) and a critical edition]. Paris: Centre national de la recherche scientifique.
- Schönberger, Axel (2008). Die Ars minor des Aelius Donatus. Lateinischer Text und kommentierte deutsche Übersetzung einer antiken Elementargrammatik aus dem 4. Jahrhundert nach Christus [The Ars minor of Aelius Donatus. Latin text and annotated German translation of an ancient elementary grammar from the 4th century AD]. Bibliotheca Romanica et Latina, volume 6. Frankfurt: Valentia, ISBN 978-3-936132-31-1.
- Schönberger, Axel (2009). Die Ars maior des Aelius Donatus. Lateinischer Text und kommentierte deutsche Übersetzung einer antiken Lateingrammatik des 4. Jahrhunderts für den fortgeschrittenen Anfängerunterricht [The Ars maior of Aelius Donatus. Latin text and annotated German translation of an ancient Latin grammar of the 4th century for advanced beginner lessons]. Bibliotheca Romanica et Latina, volume 7. Frankfurt: Valentia, ISBN 978-3-936132-32-8.

== See also ==
- Priscian
- Disticha Catonis
