= Sherwood Oaks Film School =

Film School in California, USA

- Formation: 1971
- Type: Nonprofit Film School
- Headquarters: Hollywood, California, U.S.
- Website: https://sherwoodoaksfilmschool.com

Sherwood Oaks Film School is a nonprofit 501(c)(3) educational organization. The mission of the school is to provide opportunities for students to meet with and learn from working entertainment industry professionals who have achieved success in the movie and television business.

== History ==
Sherwood Oaks Film School's was originally founded as an alternative high school, dubbed Sherwood Oaks Experimental High School. Gary Shusett, brother of Alien film franchise co-creator Ronald Shusett, joined the school as headmaster in 1968. He renamed the school the Sherwood Oaks Experimental College in 1972, and began to offer classes to adults in a range of fields including batik and shipbuilding in bottles. In 1974, with the school on the verge of closing, Shusett contacted film industry celebrities and requested that they lecture at the school. The school came to offer classes on a broad range of filmmaking topics, with lectures from notable Hollywood names. The school changed its name to Sherwood Oaks College in 2010, and to Sherwood Oaks Film School in 2014. Screenwriting teacher Syd Field conducted his first workshop there. Through the years hundreds of industry professionals have lectured at the school, including Paul Newman, Robert Redford, George C. Scott, Lily Tomlin, Mel Brooks, Shelley Winters, Robert Altman, Jack Lemmon, and Lucille Ball. Notable alumni include Sylvester Stallone, James Cameron, Paul Haggis, and Nancy Meyers.
