= Screen Play (blog) =

Online forum on Australian videogame culture

- Website type: Videogame Industry & Culture
- Creator: Jason Hill
- Website: screenplayblog.com.au
- Launched: 2006

Screen Play is an online forum focusing on Australian videogame culture. Between May 2006 and April 2014 Screen Play was a blog in Fairfax Media newspapers The Age (Melbourne), Sydney Morning Herald, Brisbane Times and WAtoday. Screen Play was founded by Jason Hill and featured regular contributions by journalist James "DexX" Dominguez. Both the Brisbane Times and WA Today began mirroring the blog on 26 June 2009.

Screen Play was launched on 5 May 2006. In an initial post, Mr Hill wrote that the blog would:

"...provide lively and entertaining coverage of the burgeoning games industry... a place where you can debate and share your thoughts on this exciting new medium. And hopefully, have plenty of fun."

== Recurring issues ==
Some of the issues that Screen Play has revisited on a regular basis include:

- Australia's videogame ratings system - advocating the introduction of an R18+ classification
- Australia's changing gaming demographics
- Battle Stations - comparing the strengths and weaknesses of gaming consoles
- The Screen Play community voting for their favourite games of the year.

== Your Turn ==
In March 2008, Screen Play launched Your Turn, an initiative to encourage the blog's visitors to contribute their own essays on videogame culture. Another incentive to would-be writers was a monthly prize of a Sony games console.

Your Turn winning essays have included themes such as "passing videogaming onto your children", "how to game when you've hurt one arm" & an intensive investigation comparing Australia's game pricing to pricing in other territories.

== Two Player Mode ==
In March 2009, Screen Play launched Two Player Mode, an inter-blog debate feature. Each month, a gaming issue was debated between Jason Hill (Screen Play) and David Wildgoose (Kotaku Australia). The debate was mirrored across both blogs.

== Split Screen ==
In June 2009, Screen Play announced that "Your Turn" contributor James "DexX" Dominguez would be writing a new weekly column, titled "Split Screen". James was described as "one of the Screen Play community's brightest stars" with an "astonishing reservoir of gaming and pop culture". Mr Dominguez is the first Screen Play reader to have been promoted to a regular writing role on the blog. James "DexX" Dominguez took over managing and writing for Screen Play in October 2012, writing Tuesdays through to Fridays.

== Game Taco ==
In March 2010, four of Screen Play's most prolific contributors launched their own gaming podcast, called Game Taco. James "DexX" Dominguez, Mark "Mr Ak" Johnson, Tim "Wall" Saitta and Steve "Smoolander" Smoothy discuss gaming issues, and interview guests involved in many aspects of videogames. This podcast ended in early 2013 as the contributors faced conflicting priorities.

== Critical response ==
Jason Hill was awarded "Best Gaming Journalist" in the 2006 Sun Microsystems IT Journalism Awards.

Screen Play won the award for Best Contribution to forwarding the Industry by a Publication or Journalist at the Interactive Entertainment Association of Australia's awards in 2008.
