= Story structure =

Literary element

Story structure or narrative structure is the recognizable or comprehensible way in which a narrative's different elements are unified, including in a particularly chosen order and sometimes specifically referring to the ordering of the plot: the narrative series of events, though this can vary based on culture. In a play or work of theatre especially, this can be called dramatic structure, which is presented in audiovisual form. Story structure can vary by culture and by location. The following is an overview of various story structures and components that might be considered.

== Definition ==
Story is a sequence of events, which can be true or fictitious, that appear in prose, verse or script, designed to amuse and/or inform an audience. Story structure is a way to organize the story's elements into a recognizable sequence. It has been shown to influence how the brain organizes information. Story structures can vary from culture to culture and throughout history. The same named story structure may also change over time as the culture also changes.

== Variations ==
=== Three-act structure ===
The three-act structure is a common structure in classical film and other narrative forms in or associated with the West.

First described in the fourth century A.D. by Aelius Donatus in his commentary on the works of Terence, the form was popularized by Syd Field in Screenplay: The Foundations of Screenwriting. Based on his recommendation that a play have a "beginning, middle, and end," the structure has been falsely attributed to Aristotle, who in fact argued for a two-act structure consisting of a "complication" and "dénouement" split by a peripeteia.

The sections are:

The first act begins with setup, where all of the main characters and their basic situations are introduced, as well as the setting. It contains the primary level of characterization for both of these (exploring the characters' backgrounds and personalities, the relationships between them, and the dynamics of the world they live in). This setup is often called the exposition.

Later in the first act, the protagonist experiences a dynamic event known as the inciting incident (or catalyst). Their initial actions are to deal with this event and attempt to reestablish order. These lead to the first plot point, where the first act ends and a dramatic question is raised; for example, "Will X disable the bomb?" or "Will Y end up with their love interest?"

The second act, or confrontation, is considered to be the bulk of the story. Here, the characters' conflict is most developed (particularly between the protagonist and antagonist) as well as any changes in values and personality one or more characters may undergo (known as character development, or a character arc). This leads to the second plot point, where the second act ends and the protagonist returns to their ordinary world.

The third act, or resolution, is when the problem in the story boils over, forcing the characters to confront it, allowing all the elements of the story to come together, leading to the climax, which is the answer to the dramatic question, being hand in hand with the end of the conflict.

=== Kishōtenketsu ===
Kishōtenketsu is a structure mainly derived from classical Chinese, Korean, and Japanese narratives.

Kishōtenketsu is divided into four sections, which have been defined and used differently by narratives from each of the three cultures where the form is most commonly found. The first section is generally considered an introduction of sorts across all three interpretations, albeit understood by each in a different way. The second may refer to the development, or to a beginning of an action related to self-realization. The third section is based around a turning point, change in direction, reversal, or twist. The fourth and final section concerns itself with a result or conclusion, a consequence thereof, or a 'coming to fruition'.

== History ==
This covers a loose worldwide history of story structure.

=== European and European Diaspora ===
The first known treatise on story structure comes from Aristotle's Poetics. He advocated for a continuous two-act plot: δέσις (desis) and λύσις (lysis) which roughly translates to binding and unbinding, that was not centered on "one individual", but where the characters learn a lesson through negative reinforcement. He believed the Chorus was the most important part of the story.

Later scholars such as Horace in Ars Poetica and Aelius Donatus in Aeli Donati qvod fertvr Commentvm Terenti: Accendvnt Evgravphi Volume 2 argued for a five act chorus. Neither specify that five acts should be for the story itself, but for the chorus.

Most extant theories of story structure took off in the 19th-20th centuries, the first notable work being Gustav Freytag's Die Technik des Dramas which was published in 1863. He outlined the basics for what would later become the foundation for the three– and five–act story structures. He outlined the sections of the story as Introduction, Rise, Climax, Return or Fall, and Catastrophe.

Georges Polti in The Thirty-Six Dramatic Situations (1895) proposed multiple plot forms in lieu of Freytag's single structure, also making a point of discussing material from cultures that Freytag disparaged.

This continued into the 19th century when Selden Lincoln Whitcomb wrote A Study of a Novel which examines the basis for Silas Marner's plot structure, where he argues for the Line of Emotion on Page 39. He argues that "The general epistolary structure may be partially represented by a graphic design." For this, he posts a proposed design for Miss. Burney Evelina on page 21.

He presupposes that stories might have different shapes for those emotions. This leads to diagramming, later described by Joseph Esenwein, who directly cited him, but argued that the diagram was supposed to be used only for short stories. He follows Selden Lincoln Whitcomb's recommendations and says that the parts are incident, emotion, crisis, suspense, climax, dénouement, conclusion.

This diagram was copied and explained one for one by Kenneth Rowe almost verbatim, in Kenneth Rowe's Write That Play, though no credit was given to Joseph Esenwein. The plot structure was then used by Death of a Salesman author Arthur Miller.

However, the coining for "Exposition" as the first part goes to earlier author, Rev. J.K. Brennan, who wrote his essay "The General Design of Plays for the book 'The Delphian Course'" (1912) for the Delphian Society. Exposition, not Introduction nor "Incident" are used as the first part.

This leads to Percy Lubbock who wrote The Craft of Fiction in 1921. He argued that there were too many story structures in the time period which made it harder to study academically, and thus proposed that conflict should be at the center of all stories, using such works as War and Peace by Leo Tolstoy. He also advocated for Death of the Author in his work. He made a concentrated effort to look at conflict at the center of stories.

Writers such as E. M. Forster and Virginia Woolf disagreed with him, the latter of which wrote in November 1923: "This is my prime discovery so far; & the fact that I've been so long finding it, proves, I think, how false Percy Lubbock's doctrine is--that you can do this sort of thing consciously." She went back and forth on the work throughout her life. She thus wrote some bits on their own treaties.

Gertrude Stein also later contributed to the general feel of stories by promoting stream-of-consciousness and supported much of Literary Modernism and looking at writing as a look into psychology.

This was furthered by Lajos Egri who advocated for using psychology to build characters in The Art of Dramatic Writing, published 1946. He also examines character through the lens of physiology, sociology and psychology.

However, there was a rise in structuralism in the mid-to-late 20th century with such thinkers as Roland Barthes, Vladimir Propp, Joseph Campbell, and Northrop Frye, who often tried to find a unifying idea for story structure and how to academically study it. For example, Joseph Campbell tried to find one unifying story structure for myth, Roland Barthes further argued for the Death of the Author theory and Propp tried to find a story structure for Russian folktales.

In Northrop Frye's Anatomy of Criticism, he deals extensively with what he calls myths of spring, summer, fall, and winter:

- Spring myths are comedies, that is, stories that lead from bad situations to happy endings. Shakespeare's Twelfth Night is such a story.
- Summer myths are similarly utopian fantasies such as Dante's Paradiso.
- Fall myths are tragedies that lead from ideal situations to disaster. Compare Hamlet, Othello, and King Lear and the movie Legends of the Fall.
- Winter myths are dystopias; for example, George Orwell's 1984, Aldous Huxley's Brave New World, and Ayn Rand's novella Anthem.

In Frye's Great Code, he offers two narrative structures for plots:

- A U-shaped structure, that is, a story that begins with a state of equilibrium that descends to disaster and then upward to a new stable condition. This is the shape of a comedy.
- An inverted U-shape structure, that is, a story in which the protagonist rises to prominence and descends to disaster. This is the shape of tragedy.

Lajos Egri is then credited in Syd Field's last edition of The Foundations of a Screenwriting published in 1979. The book argued for three acts, not five, and had no peak in the final diagram.

This idea of a universal story structure fell out of favor with poststructuralism. Theorists such as Michel Foucault and Jacques Derrida asserted that such universally shared, deep structures were logically impossible.

At the same time that Literary Structuralists rose with story structure, there were also Postmodernism and Post-postmodernism, which often argued about the nature of stories and what, if existing, story structures could be. Some authors, such as John Gardner, advocated for the use of both, such as in The Art of Fiction (1983).

Ideas of this got shared over the next few decades, which lead to writers such as Blake Snyder, who in Save the Cat contributed language such as "Story Beats".

== Categories ==
Most forms of narrative fall under two main categories: linear narrative and nonlinear narrative. Other forms also include interactive narration, and interactive narrative.

- Linear narrative is the most common form of narration, where events are largely portrayed in a chronological order telling the events in the order in which they occurred.
- Nonlinear narrative, disjointed narrative, or disrupted narrative, is a narrative technique where events are portrayed out of chronological order or in other ways where the narrative does not follow the direct causality pattern.
- Interactive narration refers to a work where the linear narrative is driven by, rather than influenced by, the user's interaction.
- Interactive narrative is a form of fiction in which users are able to make choices that influence the narrative (for example, through alternative plots or resulting in alternative endings) through their actions.

=== Linear narrative ===
The overwhelmingly most typical story structure is a linear one, in which events proceed chronologically; they are presented from the beginning, through the middle, to the end, in that order. Even within the constraints of a basic linear plot, however, diversity exists regarding the exact presentational nuances. While, strictly speaking, the chronology moves forward through time in a linear structure, there are subjective inclusions of details, arbitrary viewpoints, and often even time-jumps, as much as in nonlinear stories. Also, traditional linear narratives may still break from expectations in other ways, such as by employing plot twists or an unreliable narrator.

=== Nonlinear narrative ===
Audiences experience narratives through a consistent forward movement through real time. Still, narratives can be structured in such a way that delivers their acts, scenes, or plot points in an order that is not chronological. Flashbacks are jumps backward in narrative time, though they rely upon the audience fundamentally understanding the linear nature of the story. An example of a classic film delivered as a single extended flashback is Orson Welles' film Citizen Kane, which briefly begins at the end before then proceeding through the beginning, the middle, and the end once more. Although some films like this one appear to open (very briefly) with the ending, once flashing back to the beginning of the story, they often proceed linearly from there. Usually the film will also proceed past the supposed ending shown at the beginning of the movie to provide extra conclusive details and thus a "true ending".

Other narratives present scenes in a more seemingly random, jumbled, or ambiguous order through time, a famous example being Quentin Tarantino's 1994 film Pulp Fiction. The film is ostensibly three separate stories, which, by the conclusion, are revealed to actually be three sections, presented non-chronologically, of one unified story.

An even more ambitious attempt at constructing a film based on nonlinear narrative is Alain Resnais's 1993 French film Smoking/No Smoking. The plot contains parallel developments, playing on the idea of what might have happened had the characters made different choices.

Outside of film, some novels also present their narrative in a nonlinear fashion. Creative writing professor Jane Alison describes nonlinear narrative "patterns" such as spirals, waves, and meanders in her 2019 book Meander, Spiral, Explode: Design and Pattern in Narrative. The chapters of Chitra Banerjee Divakaruni's novel Before We Visit the Goddess are not arranged based on the linear sequence of events, but rather in a way that fulfills certain literary techniques. This allows the characters in the novel to have a believable life timeline while still employing the techniques that make a story enjoyable.

=== Interactive narration ===
In works of interactive narration there is only one narrative, but the method of delivery requires the user to actively work to gain the next piece of the narrative, or have to piece the parts of narrative that they have together in order to form a coherent narrative.

This is the narrative approach of some modern video games. A player will be required to reach an objective, complete a task, solve a puzzle, or finish a level before the narrative continues.

=== Interactive narrative ===
An interactive narrative is one which is composed with a branching structure where a single starting point may lead to multiple developments and outcomes. The principle of all such games is that, at each step of the narrative, the user makes choices that advance the story, leading to a new series of choices. Authoring nonlinear narrative or dialogue thus implies imagining an indefinite number of parallel stories.

In a gamebook, readers are told to turn to a certain page according to the choice they wish to make to continue the story. Typically, the choice will be an action rather than dialogue. For example, the hero hears a noise in another room and must decide to open the door and investigate, run away, or call for help. This kind of interactive experience of a story is possible with video games and books (where the reader is free to turn the pages) but less adapted to other forms of entertainment. Improvisational theatre is similarly open-ended, but of course cannot be said to be authored.

== Graphic narrative ==
A simple graphic narrative, such as in comics, has four stages: an introduction of the characters and a description of a situation; the introduction of a problem, unexpected opportunity, or other complication into the situation; a resolution in the form of a partial or complete response to the problem by one or more of the characters; and the denouement, the aftermath of the response that makes clear the success, partial success, non-success, or uncertain success of the response. This fourth stage may also show how the original situation has changed due to what has taken place in the Complication and Resolution stages of the narrative.

In a simple narrative, the four stages appear in order. That is, the sequence of the telling or presentation follows the chronology of the told. In a more complex story, the order of the telling may vary. For instance, such a story may begin with the Denouement and then present the Situation, Complication, and Resolution in a flashback. But this is not the case with a simple narrative.

== See also ==
- Article structure—structure in journalistic writing
- List of story structures
- Narratology
- Narreme as the basic unit of narrative structure
- Non-narrative film
- Rising action
- Rule of three (writing)
- Screenwriting
- Suspense
- The Writer's Journey: Mythic Structure for Writers
