= Epitasis =

Main action of a play in classical drama

In classical drama, the epitasis (Ancient Greek: ἐπίτασις) is the main action of a play, in which the trials and tribulations of the main character increase and build toward a climax and dénouement. It is the third and central part when a play is analyzed into five separate parts: prologue, protasis, epitasis, catastasis and catastrophe.
