= Three-act structure =

Dramatic structure

A visual representation of the three-act structure

The three-act structure is a model used in narrative fiction that divides a story into three parts (acts), often called the Setup, the Confrontation, and the Resolution. Syd Field described it in his 1979 book Screenplay: The Foundations of Screenwriting.

== Dramatic question ==
As the story moves along, the plot usually progresses in such a way as to pose a major dramatic question. For example,

- Will the boy get the girl?
- Will the hero save the day?
- Will the detective solve the mystery?
- Will the criminal be caught by law enforcement and brought to justice?
- Will the protagonist be murdered by the fugitive?

The answer to such a question is generally provided in the climax of the story. The event implied by the question may occur or not occur.

== Structure ==
=== First act ===
The first act is usually used for exposition, to establish the main characters, their relationships, and the world they live in. Later in the first act, a dynamic, on-screen incident occurs, known as the inciting incident, or catalyst, that confronts the main character (the protagonist), and whose attempts to deal with this incident lead to a second and more dramatic situation, known as the first plot point, which signals the end of the first act, ensures that life will never be the same again for the protagonist, and raises a dramatic question that will be answered in the climax. The dramatic question is generally framed in terms of the protagonist's call to action (Will X recover the diamond? Will Y win their love interest? Will Z capture the killer?).

=== Second act ===
The second act, also referred to as "rising action", typically depicts the protagonist's attempt to resolve the problem initiated by the first turning point, only to find themselves in ever worsening situations. Part of the reason protagonists seem unable to resolve their problems is because they do not yet have the skills to deal with the forces of antagonism that confront them. They must learn new skills and arrive at a higher sense of awareness of who they are and what they are capable of in order to deal with their predicament, which in turn changes who they are. This is referred to as character development or a character arc. This cannot be achieved alone and they are usually aided and abetted by mentors and co-protagonists.

=== Third act ===
The third act features the resolution of the story and its subplots. The climax is the scene or sequence in which the main tensions of the story are brought to their most intense point and the dramatic question is answered, leaving the protagonist and other characters with a new sense of who they really are.

== See also ==
- Act (drama) § Three-act plays
- Act structure
- Dramatic structure
- Hero's journey
