= Catastrophe (drama) =

Final resolution in a poem or narrative plot

In drama, particularly the tragedies of classical antiquity, the catastrophe is the final resolution in a poem or narrative plot, which unravels the intrigue and brings the piece to a close. In comedies, this may be a marriage between main characters; in tragedies, it may be the death of one or more main characters. It is the final part of a play, following the protasis, epitasis, and catastasis.

The catastrophe is either simple or complex, for which also the fable and action are denominated. In a simple catastrophe, there is no change in the state of the main characters, nor any discovery or unravelling; the plot being only a mere passage out of agitation, to quiet and repose. This catastrophe is rather accommodated to the nature of the epic poem, than of the tragedy.

In a complex catastrophe, the main character undergoes a change of fortune, sometimes by means of a discovery, and sometimes without. The qualifications of this change are that it be probable and necessary: in order to be probable, it must be the natural result or effect of the foregoing actions, i.e. it must spring from the subject itself, or take its rise from the incidents, and not be introduced merely to serve a turn.

The discovery in a complex catastrophe must have the same qualifications as the catastrophe itself, of which it is a principal part: it must be both probable and necessary. To be probable, it must spring out of the subject itself; not affected by means of marks or tokens, rings, bracelets, or by a mere recollection, as is frequently done both in ancient and modern times. To be necessary, it must never leave the characters it concerns in the same sentiments they had before, but still produce either love or hatred, etc. Sometimes, the change consists in the discovery, sometimes it follows at a distance, and sometimes results immediately from it; the last was used, for example, in Oedipus Rex.

Among critics, it has long been debated whether the catastrophe should always end happily, and favorably on the side of virtue, or not; i.e. whether virtue is always to be rewarded, and vice punished, in the catastrophe. Aristotle, for example, preferred a shocking catastrophe, rather than a happy one; in that regard, the moving of terror and pity, which is the aim of tragedy, is better affected by the former than the latter.

René Le Bossu, a 17th-century French critic, divides the catastrophe, at least with regard to epics, into the unravelling, or denouement, and the finishing, or achievement; the latter of which he makes the result of the former, and to consist in the hero's passage out of a state of trouble and agitation, to rest and quiet. This period is but a point, without extent or duration; in which it differs from the former, which comprehends everything after the plot is laid. He adds, that there are several unravellings in a piece, each interconnected. The finishing is the end of the last unravelling.

In the twentieth century, J. R. R. Tolkien distinguished between what he called the catastrophe and the eucatastrophe. The eucatastrophe is a classical catastrophe with an unexpected positive outcome for the protagonist. This term was coined to distance itself from the vernacular use of the word 'catastrophe' to signify disaster (which gave the term negative connotations in everyday usage).

== See also ==
- Dramatic structure
