= Screenplay (book) =

Book by Syd Field

Screenplay: The Foundations of Screenwriting
- Expanded Edition
- Author: Syd Field
- Language: English
- Subject: Filmmaking, Screenwriting
- Publisher: Dell Publishing Company
- Publication place: United States
- Media type: Print
- ISBN: 978-0440582731

Screenplay: The Foundations of Screenwriting ("A Step-by-Step Guide from Concept to Finished Script") is a non-fiction book and filmmaking guide written by Syd Field. First published in 1979, Screenplay covers the art and craft of screenwriting. Considered a bestseller shortly after its release, to date it has sold millions of copies. It has served as a reference for Judd Apatow, James Cameron, Frank Darabont, Tina Fey and many other professional screenwriters. Now translated into more than a dozen languages, Screenplay is considered the "bible" of the screenwriting craft.

== Overview ==
Screenplay is noted as the first book to identify the three-act screenplay model. At the heart of Field's explanation of how his screenplay model worked was the paradigm.

=== The Paradigm ===
In the book, Field outlines the paradigm to which he says most successful screenplays adhere. In Field's view, successful screenplays are made up of three distinct divisions. He calls these setup, confrontation, and resolution, and each of them appears in its own act within a screenplay.

- Act I contains the setup. It is approximately the first quarter of a screenplay, and reveals the main character, premise, and situation of the story.
- Act II contains the confrontation. It lasts for the next two quarters of the screenplay, and clearly defines the main goal of the protagonist.
- Act III contains the resolution. This is the final quarter of the screenplay. This answers the question as to whether or not the main character succeeded in his or her goal.

Between each of these acts, the paradigm states that there is a plot point—an event that spins the plot into a new direction, and transitions into a new act of the screenplay.

== Reception ==
- After selling millions of copies, the book is credited with starting the "how-to-write-a-movie-script industry."
- Screenplay is used in more than 400 colleges and universities worldwide.
- Filmmaker Judd Apatow said, "Whenever I write a screenplay, I take out his book and reread it...to see if I screwed anything up."

== See also ==
- Three-act structure
- Dramatic structure
- Save The Cat! The Last Book on Screenwriting You'll Ever Need
