= Climax (narrative) =

Point of highest tension in narrative

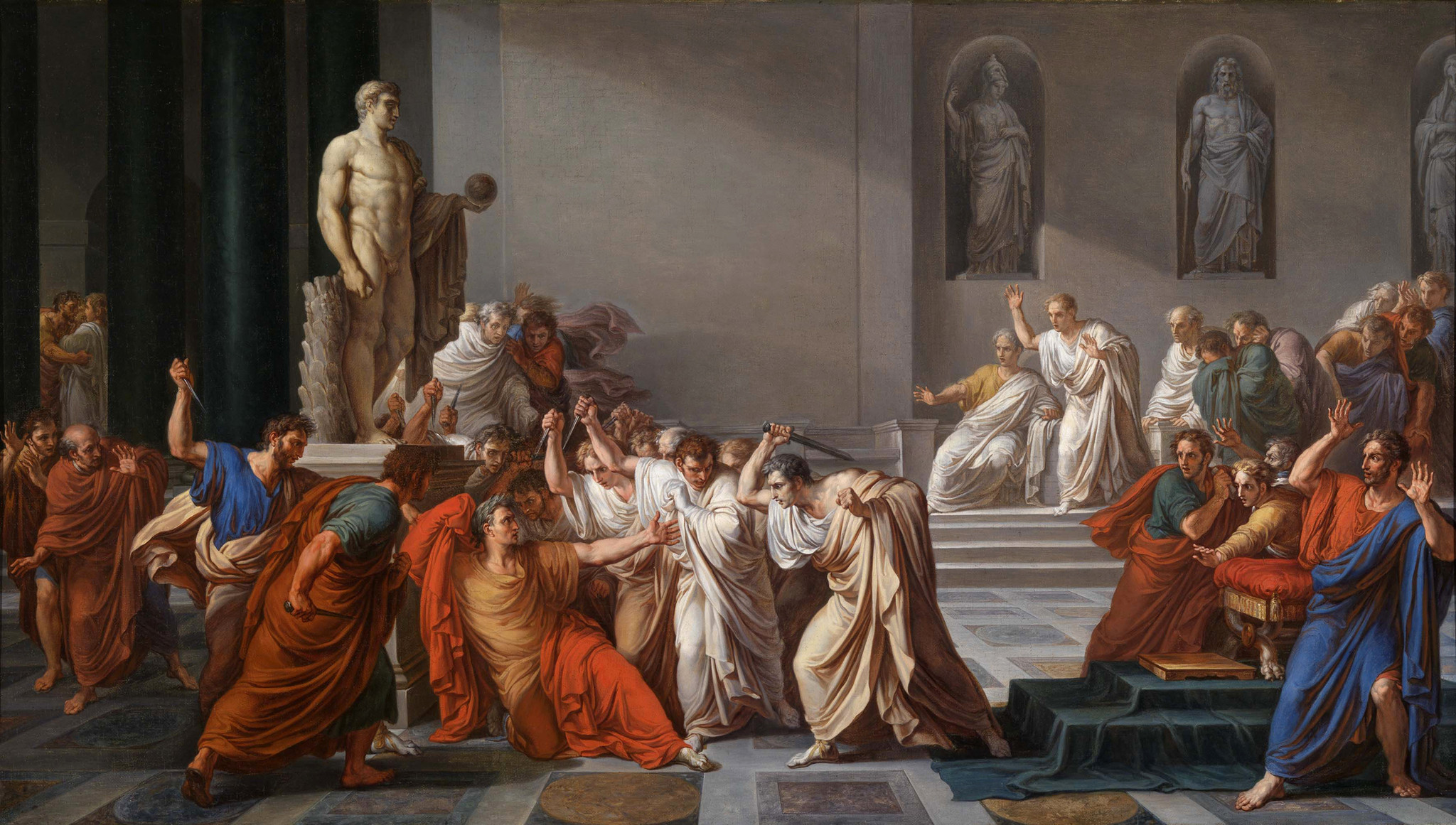
The death of Caesar, the climax of Shakespeare's play Julius Caesar

The climax (from Ancient Greek κλῖμαξ (klîmax) 'staircase, ladder') or turning point of a narrative work is its point of highest tension and drama, or it is the time when the action starts during which the solution is given. The climax of a story is a literary element.

As a literary element, it is a stage where the protagonist finally faces the greatest challenge or the ultimate obstacle, leading to the resolution or transformation. In terms of structure, climax often constitutes the second of the two parts of a story's Act II, the first being "rising action", which culminates to a moment of crisis. There are also sources that state climax is part of Act III, leading to the falling action and resolution.

== Approaches ==
There are several strategies in composing effective climax. For example, a climax that subverts the expectations of the reader or audience can provide a surprising twist that can challenge the audience's preconceived notions and understanding of the narrative. There is also the climax that meets expectations, offering a sense of satisfaction and fulfillment since it is aligned with the narrative cues and expectations previously induced in the minds of readers or spectators.

Some authors also employ "false climax", which may take different forms. An example is the false climax produced by breaking off the narrative abruptly the moment the suspense of the story is terminated. There is also the variant that involves an appearance of climax only for the author to introduce further conflict or twists. This may be demonstrated in the case of the marriage of James Morland and Isabella Thorpe in Jane Austen's Northanger Abbey. It initially appears to be a moment of resolution but ultimately leads to further conflict and disappointment.

Aristotle says that a climax must be "inevitable and unexpected".

== Anticlimax ==
An anticlimax is a disappointing event after events that were full of excitement. A poor anticlimax can leave tension and drama in dissolution. On the contrary, where the tone of the work requires a more equivocal conclusion instead of a dramatic change of status quo, an effective anticlimax is as valid a literary technique as a traditional climax.

There may be bathos, a technique that transitions a tense scene into comic relief, in an anticlimax, but they are not one and the same. Some anticlimaxes employ deus ex machina, such as for the fates of Katniss Everdeen and Peeta Mellark in Suzanne Collins's The Hunger Games. They originally plan to take their lives to avoid finishing the Games, yet an external force ends it for them.

== See also ==
- Dramatic structure
- Literary element
- Climax as a rhetorical device
