= List of geological features on Ganymede =

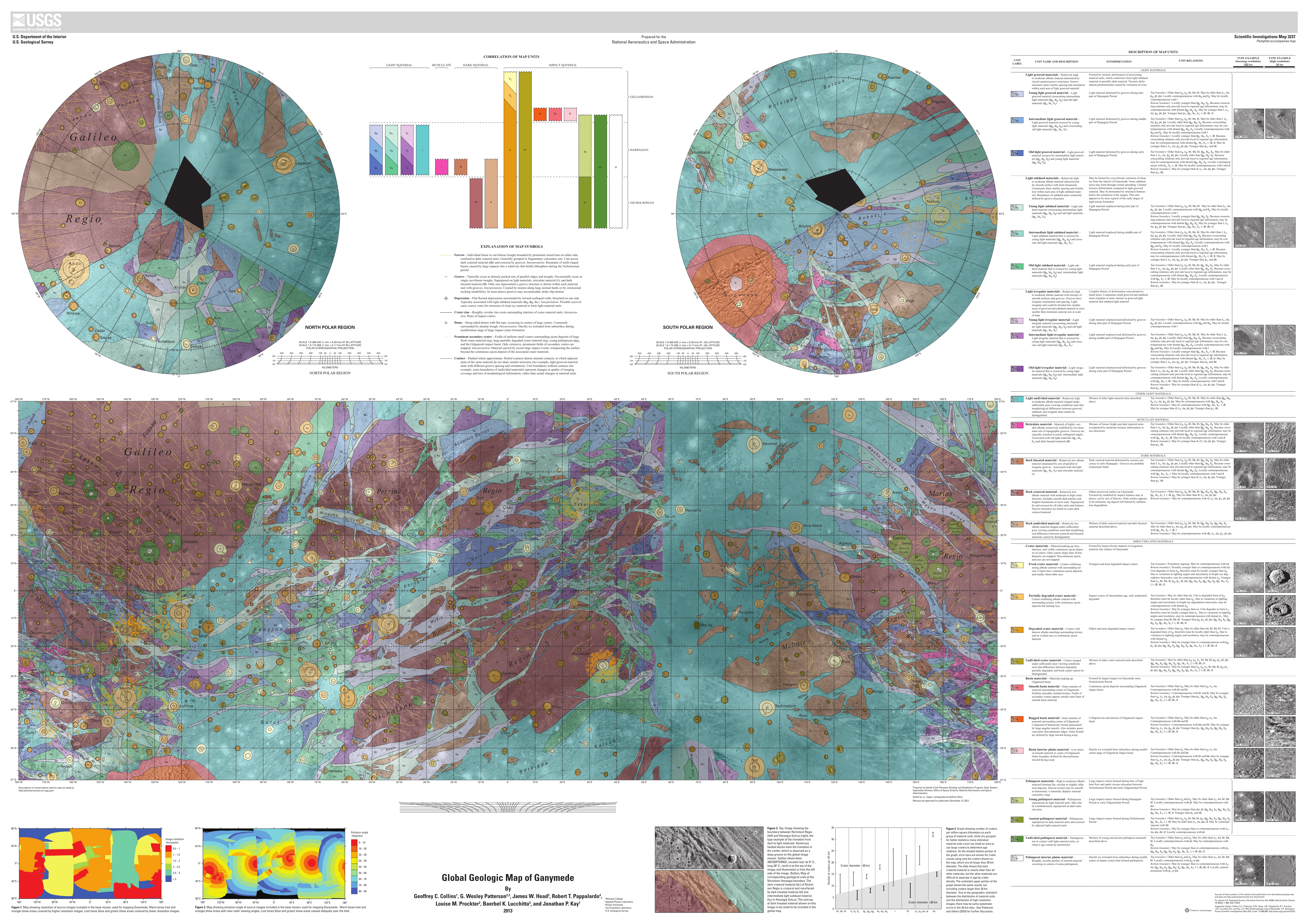
Geological map of Ganymede (February 11, 2014).

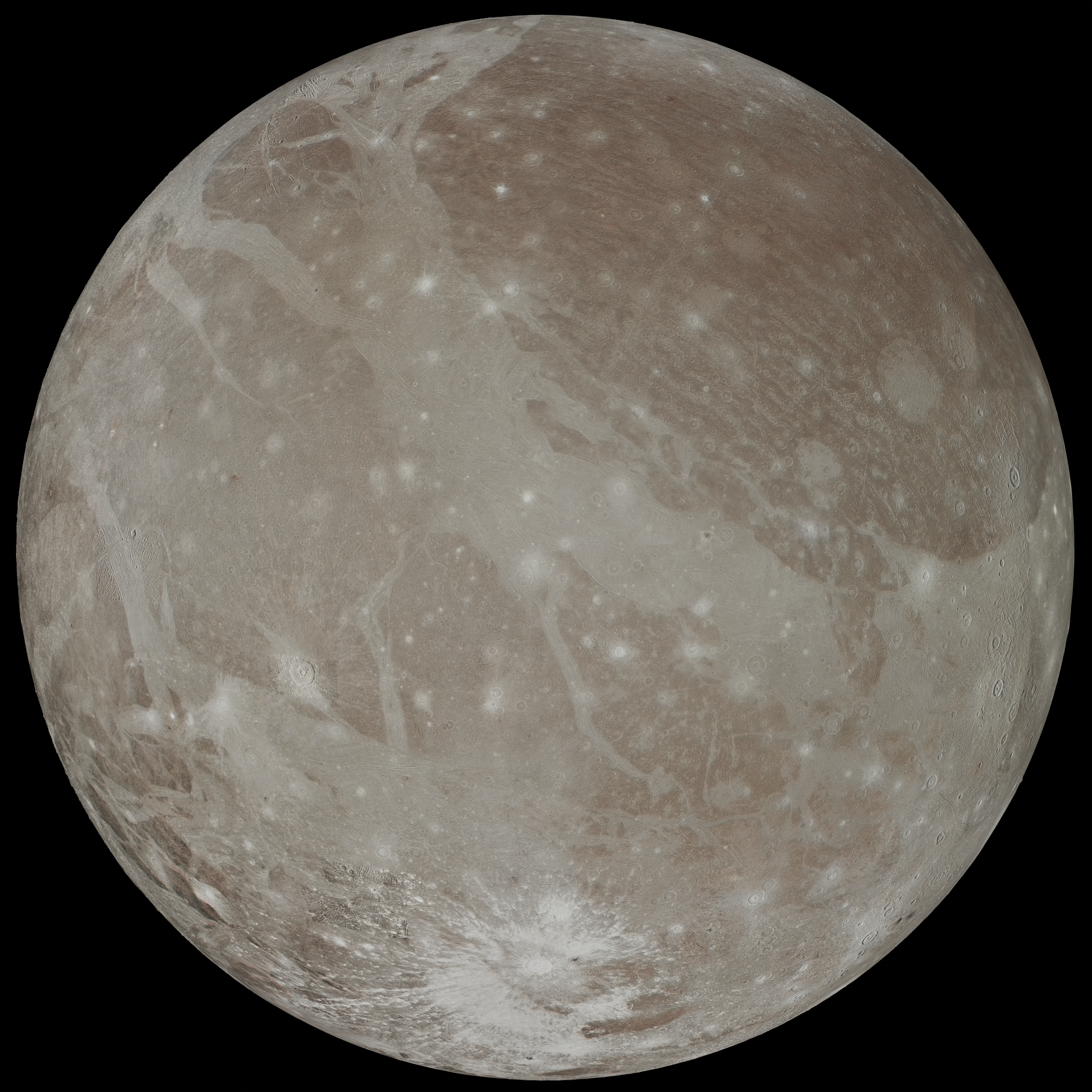

This is a list of named geological features, except craters, on Ganymede, a moon of Jupiter. The list is complete as of August 2022.

== Catenae (crater chains) ==
Catenae on Ganymede are named after deities from Ancient Near Eastern mythologies.

Name	Coordinates	Diameter (km)	Approval Date	Namesake	Refs
Enki Catena	38.84°N 13.86°W	160	1997	Enki, Principal water god of the Apsu.	WGPSN
Khnum Catena	32.90°N 10.73°W	66	1997	Khnum, Egyptian creation god.	WGPSN
Nanshe Catena	15.4°N 352.9°W	103.8	1997	Goddess of springs and canals, daughter of Enki.	WGPSN
Terah Catena	7.1°N 277.6°W	283	2000	Phoenician moon god who battled with Keret in Negeb.	WGPSN

== Faculae ==
Bright patches on Ganymede's surface, called faculae (some of which are palimpsests or ghost craters), are named after important and sacred places from Ancient Egyptian mythology.

Name	Coordinates	Diameter (km)	Approval Date	Namesake	Refs
Abydos Facula	33.4°N 153.4°W	180	1985	Abydos, Egyptian town where Osiris was worshipped.	WGPSN
Akhmin Facula	27.7°N 189.5°W	245	1997	Akhmim, Egyptian town where Min was worshipped.	WGPSN
Bigeh Facula	29°N 265.7°W	224	2000	Bigeh, island where Hapi, Egyptian Nile god, resided.	WGPSN
Busiris Facula	15.7°N 215.4°W	369	1985	Busiris, town in lower Egypt where Osiris was first installed as local god.	WGPSN
Buto Facula	13.2°N 203.5°W	245	1985	Swamp where Isis hid Osiris' body.	WGPSN
Coptos Facula	9.9°N 209.2°W	329	1985	Coptos, early town from which caravans departed.	WGPSN
Edfu Facula	25.7°N 147.1°W	184	1985	Edfu, Egyptian town where Horus was worshipped.	WGPSN
Heliopolis Facula	18.5°N 147.2°W	50	1997	Heliopolis, sacred Egyptian city of the sun.	WGPSN
Hermopolis Facula	22.4°N 195.3°W	260	1997	Hermopolis, place where Unut was worshipped.	WGPSN
Memphis Facula	14.1°N 131.9°W	361	1985	Memphis, ancient capital of lower kingdom.	WGPSN
Siwah Facula	7.0°N 143.1°W	220	1985	Siwa, oasis oracle of Zeus-Ammon; visited by Alexander.	WGPSN
Tettu Facula	37.6°N 161.2°W	189	1985	Egyptian town where Hatmenit and Osiris were worshipped.	WGPSN
Thebes Facula	7.1°N 202.4°W	360	1985	Thebes, ancient capital of upper kingdom.	WGPSN

== Fossae (ditches) ==
Fossae on Ganymede are named after deities and theological principles from Middle Eastern mythologies.

Name	Coordinates	Diameter (km)	Approval Date	Namesake	Refs
Lakhamu Fossa	11.6°S 227.7°W	370	1985	Dragon monster, or divine natural force produced by Apsu and Tiamat.	WGPSN
Lakhmu Fossae	50.4°N 128.0°W	3,700	1985	Lahmu, dragon monster, or divine natural force produced by Apsu and Tiamat.	WGPSN
Zu Fossae	38.5°N 150.5°W	2,900	1985	Anzû (Zu), dragon of chaos slain by Marduk.	WGPSN

== Paterae ==
Isolated, shallow depressions on Ganymede's surface, called paterae, are named after dried-up river valleys (known as wadis) that are found in the Middle East.

Name	Coordinates	Diameter (km)	Approval Date	Namesake	Refs
Hammamat Patera	24.23°S 318.1°W	45	2015	Wadi Hammamat in Egypt, associated with petroglyphs and ancient mining.	WGPSN
Hamra Patera	77.35°S 171.37°W	43	2015	Wadi in Jordan, associated with red sandstone cliffs and ancient copper mines.	WGPSN
Musa Patera	31.35°S 188.46°W	69	2015	Wadi Musa in Jordan, proximal to Petra archeological site.	WGPSN
Natrun Patera	30.93°S 183.26°W	37.5	2015	Wadi El Natrun in Egypt, site of ancient monasteries, proximal to site of Antoine de Saint-Exupéry's aircraft crash that inspired the novella “The Little Prince”.	WGPSN
Rum Patera	30.66°S 182.82°W	38	2015	Wadi Rum in Jordan associated with travels of T. E. Lawrence, petroglyphs, and several Neolithic sites.	WGPSN
Yaroun Patera	46.65°S 142.15°W	96	2015	Wadi Yaroun in Lebanon, Neolithic archaeological site.	WGPSN

== Regiones ==
Regiones, which are dark, ancient regions on Ganymede's surface, are named after astronomers who contributed to the discovery of Jupiter's moons.

Name	Coordinates	Diameter (km)	Approval Date	Namesake	Refs
Barnard Regio	6.8°S 11.6°W	3,200	1979	Edward E.; American astronomer (1857–1923).	WGPSN
Galileo Regio	45°N 127°W	4,440	1979	Galileo Galilei, Italian astronomer (1564–1642).	WGPSN
Marius Regio	2.5°N 187.7°W	4,940	1979	Simon; German astronomer (1570–1624).	WGPSN
Melotte Regio	12.0°S 245°W	4,100	2013	Philibert Jacques; British astronomer (1880–1961).	WGPSN
Nicholson Regio	33.1°S 6.4°W	3,900	1979	Seth Barnes; American astronomer (1891–1963).	WGPSN
Perrine Regio	34°N 28°W	3,800	1979	Charles D.; American astronomer (1867–1951).	WGPSN

== Sulci ==
Sulci are brighter, younger, and relatively smoother, grooved terrains on Ganymede. They are mostly named after deities, heroes, and important places from Middle Eastern mythologies. Others are named after places and concepts associated with the mythological Trojan prince Ganymede and his home kingdom of Troy from Greek mythology. One is named after a mythological place from Maya mythology.

Name	Coordinates	Diameter (km)	Approval Date	Namesake	Refs
Akitu Sulcus	38.9°N 194.3°W	365	1997	Where Marduk's statue was carried each year.	WGPSN
Anshar Sulcus	18.0°N 197.9°W	1,372	1979	Assyro-Babylonian; celestial-world home of Lakhmu and Lakhamu.	WGPSN
Apsu Sulci	39.4°S 234.7°W	1,950	1979	Sumero-Akkadian; primordial ocean.	WGPSN
Aquarius Sulcus	52.4°N 3.9°W	1,420	1979	Greek; Zeus set Ganymede among the stars as the constellation of Aquarius, the water carrier.	WGPSN
Arbela Sulcus	21.1°S 349.8°W	1,940	1985	Assyrian town where Ishtar was worshipped.	WGPSN
Babylon Sulci	22.5°S 264.5°W	3,100	July 29, 2013	Assyro-Babylonian town in the land known as Akkad.	WGPSN
Borsippa Sulcus	60.0°S 359.9°W	3,300	July 29, 2013	Akkadian town, location of the Sumerian god Nabu's principal sanctuary	WGPSN
Bubastis Sulci	72.3°S 282.9°W	2,651	1988	Town in Egypt where Bast was worshipped.	WGPSN
Byblus Sulcus	37.9°N 199.9°W	645	1997	Ancient Phoenician city where Adonis was worshipped.	WGPSN
Dardanus Sulcus	46.9°S 17.5°W	2,988	1979	Greek; where Ganymede was abducted by Zeus disguised as an eagle.	WGPSN
Dukug Sulcus	83.5°N 3.8°W	385	1985	Sumerian holy cosmic chamber of the gods.	WGPSN
Elam Sulci	58.2°N 200.3°W	1,855	1985	Ancient Babylonian seat of sun worship, in present-day Iran.	WGPSN
Erech Sulcus	7.3°S 179.2°W	953	1985	Akkadian town that was built by Marduk.	WGPSN
Harpagia Sulcus	11.7°S 318.7°W	1,792	1985	Greek; where Ganymede was abducted by an eagle.	WGPSN
Hursag Sulcus	9.7°S 233.1°W	750	1985	Sumerian mountain where winds dwell.	WGPSN
Kishar Sulcus	6.4°S 216.6°W	1,187	1979	Assyro-Babylonian; terrestrial-world home of Lakhmu and Lakhamu.	WGPSN
Lagash Sulcus	10.9°S 163.2°W	1,575	1985	Early Babylonian town.	WGPSN
Larsa Sulci	3.8°N 248.7°W	1,000	2000	Sumerian town.	WGPSN
Mashu Sulcus	29.8°N 205.7°W	2,960	1979	Assyro-Babylonian; mountain with twin peaks where sun rose and set.	WGPSN
Mummu Sulci	39.0°S 180.0°W	2,680	July 29, 2013	Assyro-Babylonian; the tumult of the waves at the place where the waters of primordial freshwater ocean Apsu and salt sea Tiamat are mingled.	WGPSN
Mysia Sulci	7.0°S 7.9°W	5,066	1979	Greek; where Ganymede was abducted by an eagle.	WGPSN
Nineveh Sulcus	23.5°N 53.1°W	1,700	1997	City where Ishtar was worshipped.	WGPSN
Nippur Sulcus	36.9°N 185.0°W	1,425	1985	Sumerian city.	WGPSN
Nun Sulci	49.5°N 316.4°W	1,500	1979	Egyptian; chaos; primordial ocean; held germ of all things.	WGPSN
Philae Sulcus	65.5°N 169.0°W	900	1997	Temple that was the chief sanctuary of Isis.	WGPSN
Philus Sulcus	44.1°N 209.5°W	465	1979	Greek; where Ganymede and Hebe were worshipped as rain-givers.	WGPSN
Phrygia Sulcus	12.4°N 23.5°W	3,700	1979	Greek; kingdom in Asia Minor where Ganymede was born.	WGPSN
Shuruppak Sulcus	19.3°S 232.2°W	2,800	2000	Assyro-Babylonian town on the banks of the Euphrates River where the gods planned the great flood.	WGPSN
Sicyon Sulcus	32.7°N 18.5°W	2,125	1979	Greek; where Ganymede and Hebe were worshipped as rain-givers.	WGPSN
Sippar Sulcus	15.4°S 189.3°W	1,508	1985	Ancient Babylonian town.	WGPSN
Tiamat Sulcus	3.4°N 208.5°W	1,330	1979	Assyro-Babylonian; tumultuous sea from which everything was generated.	WGPSN
Umma Sulcus	4.1°N 250.0°W	1,270	2000	Sumerian town.	WGPSN
Ur Sulcus	49.8°N 177.5°W	1,145	1985	Ancient Sumerian seat of moon worship.	WGPSN
Uruk Sulcus	0.8°N 160.3°W	2,200	1979	Babylonian city ruled by Gilgamesh.	WGPSN
Xibalba Sulcus	43.8°N 71.1°W	2,200	1997	Mayan "place of fright"; destination of those who escaped violent death.	WGPSN

== Dropped names ==
Name	Coordinates	Diameter (km)	Approval Date	Notes	Refs
Sais Facula	37.90°N 14.20°W	137.0	1988	Dropped and Disallowed. Sais, worship center of Neith, Egyptian goddess of creation, archery, fate, and weaving. Sais Facula was later identified as a crater chain (catena), not a facula. It is now called Enki Catena.	WGPSN

== See also ==
- List of quadrangles on Ganymede
- List of craters on Ganymede
