= Zu Fossae =

Multi-furrow structure on Ganymede

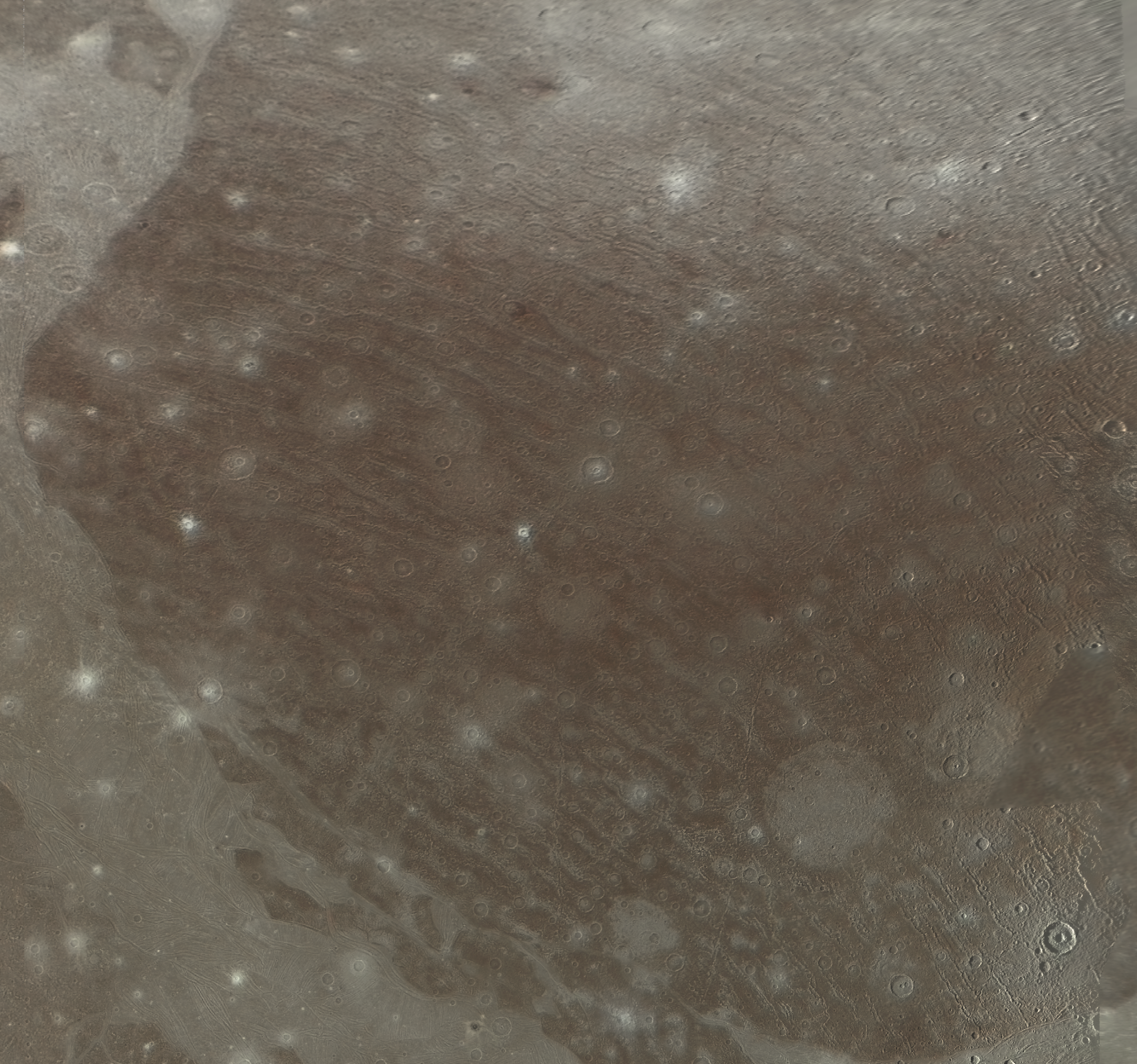
- A mosaic image of the furrow system of Zu Fossae, taken by the Galileo space probe on 27 June 1996 and 28 December 2000.
- Feature type: Fossae (Multiple Furrow system)
- Coordinates: 38.50°N 150.50°W
- Diameter: 2,900 kilometres (1,800 mi)
- Eponym: Anzû (also called Zu)

Zu Fossae is a sprawling, multi-ring system of furrows on Ganymede, the largest moon of Jupiter. A fossa (plural: fossae) is a long, narrow depression (trough) on the surface of an extraterrestrial body. It is one of the largest and most complex surface features on Ganymede.

== Naming ==
Zu Fossae is named after a creature from Babylonian mythology called Zu (also called Anzû). Mesopotamian literature describes Zu as a divine creature with the body and wings of an eagle and the head of a lion. It is infamous for stealing the Tablet of Destinies (a sacred clay tablet that bestows supreme power upon its holder) from Enlil, one of the top gods in Mesopotamian mythology. Anzû was eventually slain by the gods led by Marduk, the king of the Babylonian pantheon, and the tablet was recovered.

The naming of Zu Fossae follows the convention established by the International Astronomical Union (IAU), which states that furrow systems and fossae on Ganymede should be named after either deities or religious concepts from Ancient Middle Eastern mythology, including those from Babylonian and other Mesopotamian mythologies.

The IAU approved the name for Zu Fossae in 1985.

The Ganymedean crater Anzu is also named after the same character from Babylonian mythology.

== Location ==
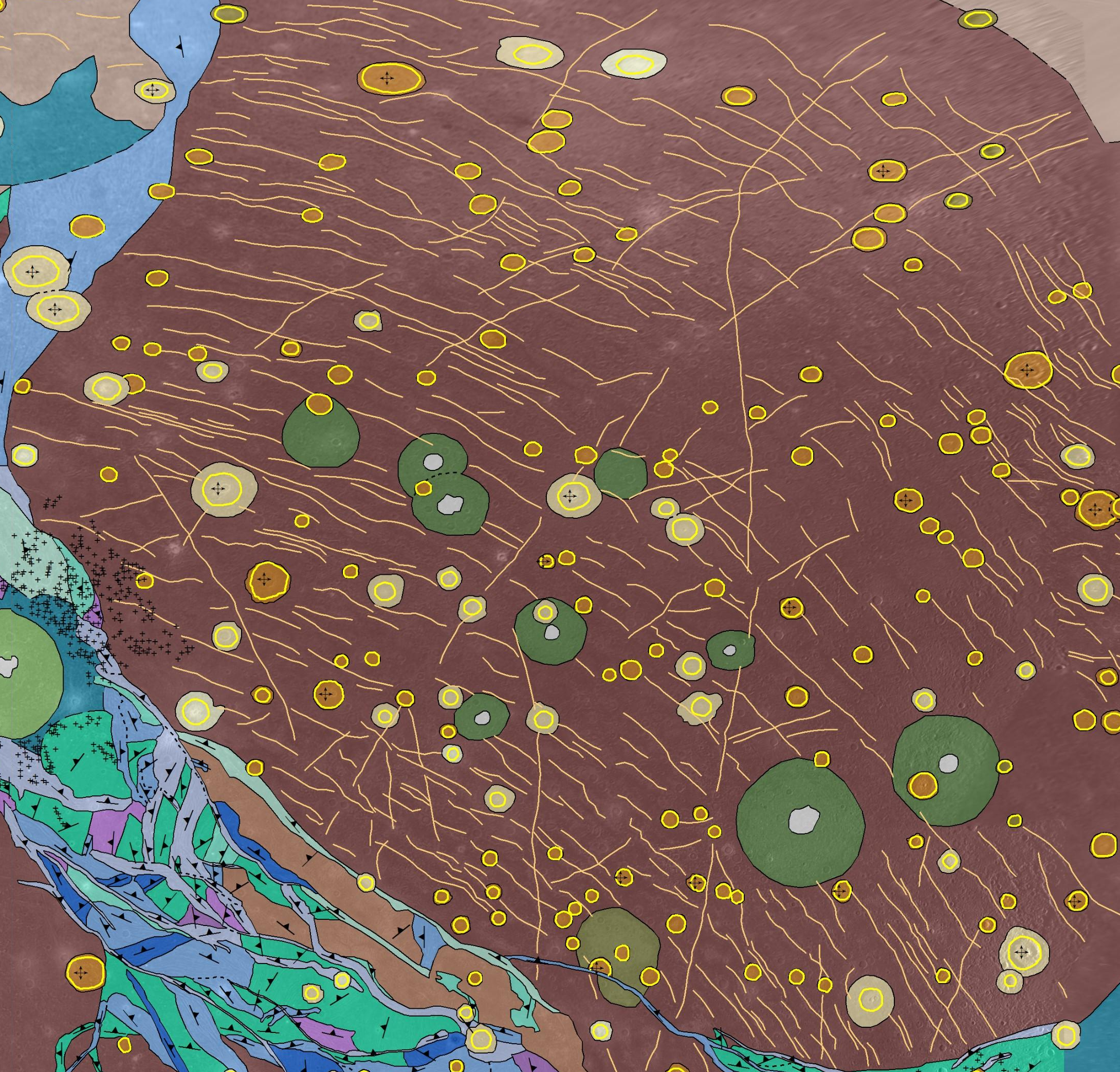
A multicolor-coded geologic map of Zu Fossae created to help viewers see the details of its topography more clearly. The concentric pale yellow lines running across the dark-red areas (which are part Galileo Regio) show the individual furrows of Zu Fossae. Its near-concentric shape can be clearly seen on the map.

Zu Fossae and all the furrows that comprise it are located entirely within the dark, ancient region of Ganymede known as Galileo Regio, where they are superimposed on the regio's dark terrain.

Zu Fossae is so large that it lies within three quadrangles of Ganymede. Most of the fossae is located within the Galileo Regio quadrangle (designated Jg3), while the rest is located within the Memphis Facula quadrangle (designated Jg7) and Uruk Sulcus quadrangle (designated Jg8).

The boundaries of Zu Fossae are demarcated by Ur Sulcus to the northwest, Nippur Sulcus to the west, Uruk Sulcus to the southwest, and Babylon Sulci to the southeast.

Zu Fossae and Galileo Regio are located on the hemisphere of Ganymede that never faces Jupiter. Because of the moon's synchronous rotation as it orbits its parent planet, an observer on the hemisphere where Zu Fossae is located would never see Jupiter in the sky (Note: For moons in synchronous rotation, such as Ganymede, 0° longitude corresponds to the part of the surface that always faces Jupiter. Regions between 90° W and 270° W longitude never face the moon's parent planet.)

== Morphology and Natural History ==
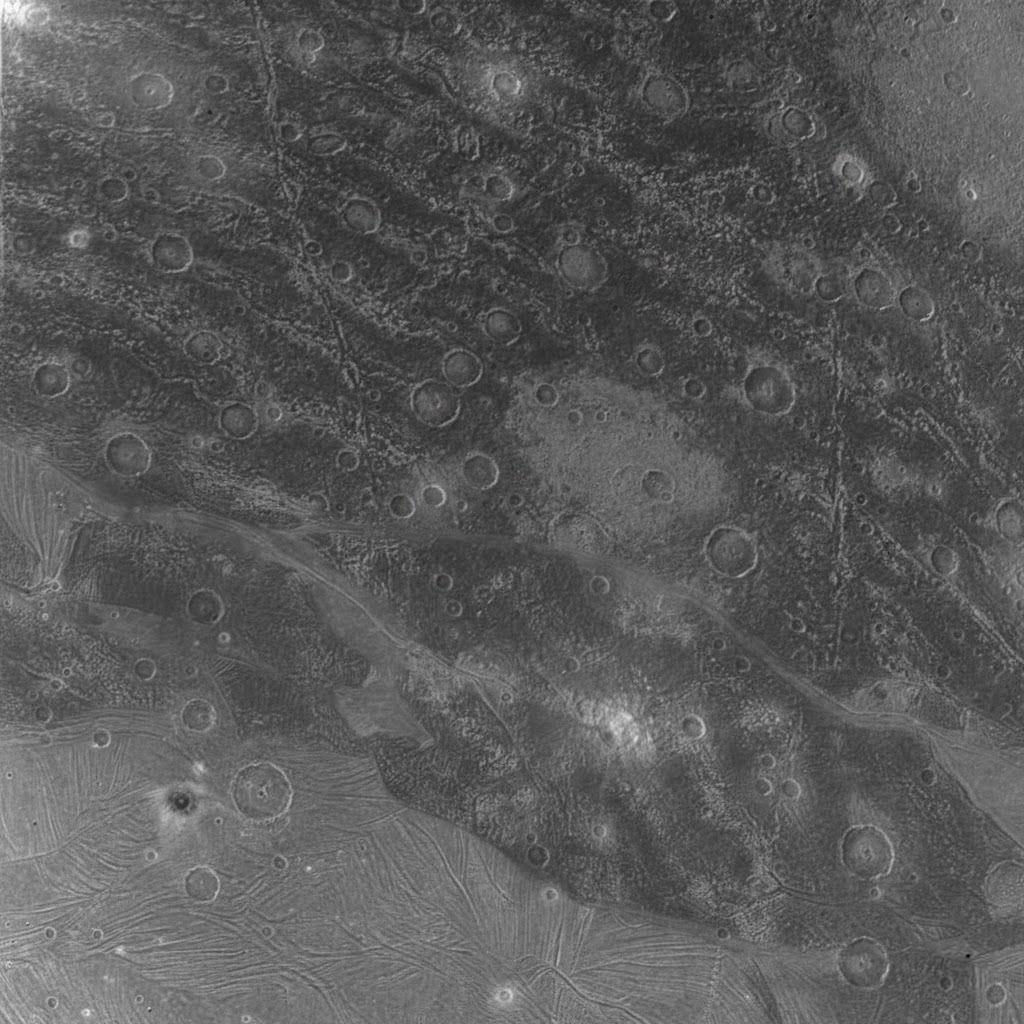
A high-resolution image of the southern furrows of Zu Fossae, taken by Voyager 2 in July 1979. The concentric shape and parallel spacing of the furrows can be seen clearly in this image. (Note: The bright spot in the middle of the image is called Siwah Facula, while the dark-floor cratered to the southwest is Khensu)

Zu Fossae is a concentric system of furrows that obscures and saturates most of the northern, western, central and southern parts of Galileo Regio.

The northern and northeastern parts of Zu Fossae are covered by a thin layer of frost that forms part of Ganymede's northern polar ice cap which extends all the way down from the north pole to as far down as 45° northern latitude. The frost makes these areas appear bluer and whiter than the frost-free regions of Galileo Regio and the rest of Zu Fossae, which appear more reddish. The frost layer is not thick enough to obscure geological features on Ganymede.

It is widely believed that Zu Fossae is the surviving northeastern remnant of a massive multi-ring crater formed by an impact that struck Ganymede about 4 billion years ago. The crater is thought to have been centered somewhere in Marius Regio to the west or the south. However, most of the center of the crater, along with parts of Zu Fossae, are believed to have been obliterated by resurfacing events that formed Ganymede's younger sulci, such as the Uruk Sulcus and Nippur Sulcus where the furrows seem to have disappeared. Only the troughs that lie within the dark, relatively undisturbed regions of Galileo Regio remain.

Zu Fossae, in turn, is partly obscured in most of its areas by numerous impact craters, faculae, and degraded palimpsests (or ghost craters), a testament to the region's extreme ancientness and relatively undisturbed state. Some of the most prominent features that overlie Zu Fossae include the Chrysor and Aleyin craters, Memphis Facula, and Buto Facula.

== Exploration ==
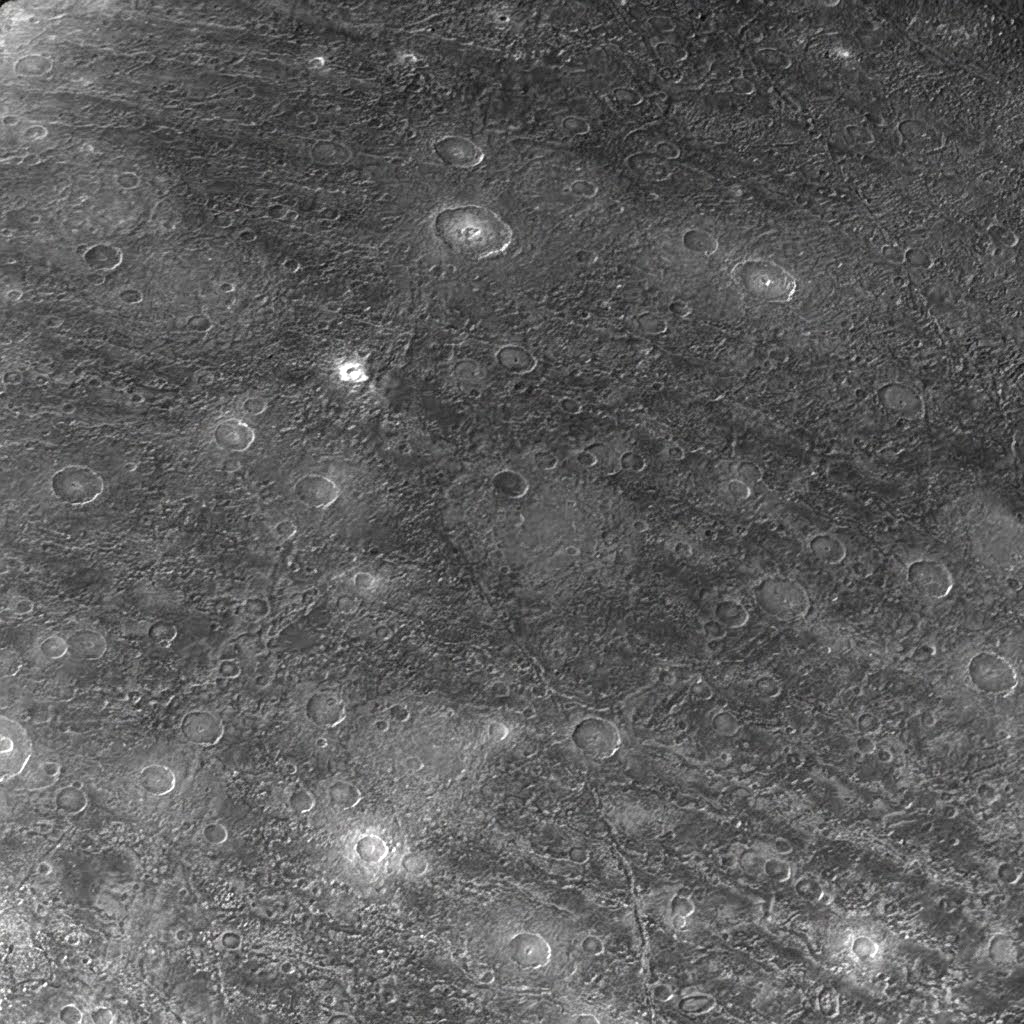
An image Edfu Facula and Khepri which obscure Zu Fossae, also taken by Voyager 2 in July 1979.

Voyager 2 was the first spacecraft to send back clear images Zu Fossae when it flew by of Ganymede in July 1979. Although the earlier and less-sophisticated probe Pioneer 10 was able to photograph Zu Fossae first, the quality of its images were extremely poor. Voyager 2's high resolution images of Zu Fossae are still some of the best available images of the furrow system.

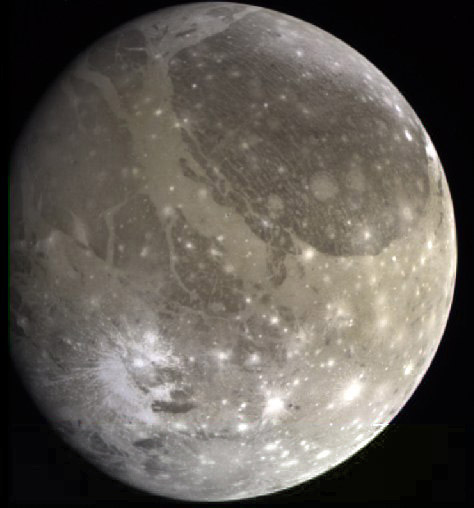
A mosaic photograph of Zu Fossae and Galileo Region (upper right) taken by Galileo in June 1996.

The best images of Zu Fossae that are available to date were those taken by Galileo space probe. The probe flew by up close to Zu Fossae during its visit to Ganymede in June 1996 and December 2000.

=== Future Missions ===
The European Space Agency's (ESA) Jupiter Icy Moons Explorer (Juice), launched in April 2023, is scheduled to arrive at Jupiter in July 2031. In July 2034, after performing multiple flybys of Ganymede and the other icy Jovian moons, Juice will settle into a low orbit around Ganymede at a distance of just 500 kilometres (310 mi). The probe is expected to return higher-resolution images of Zu Fossae, which may help planetary scientists determine whether the hypothesized massive impact that is believed to have formed Zu Fossae actually occurred.

== See also ==
Fossa (planetary nomenclature)
