= Lugalmeslam (crater) =

Crater on Ganymede

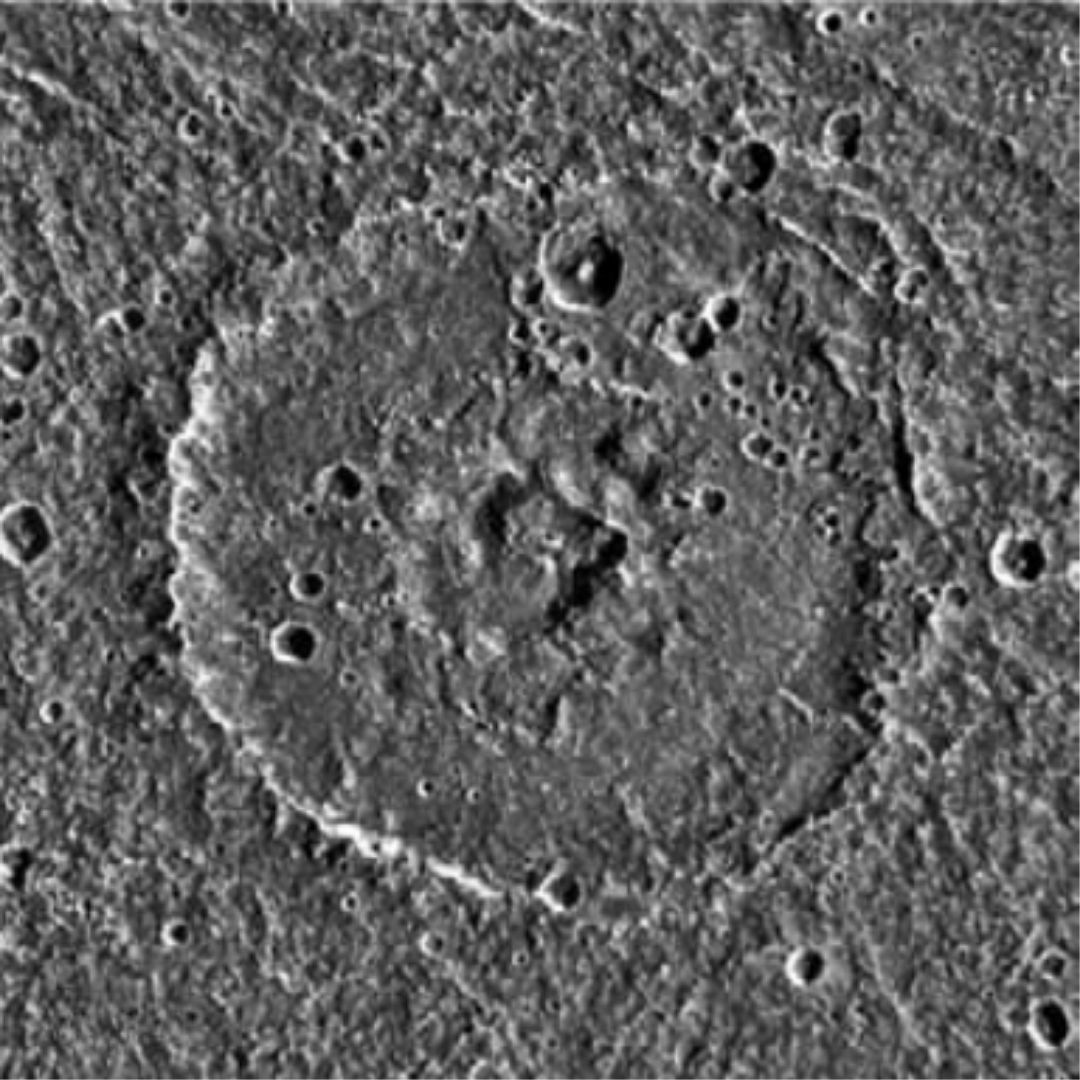
- An image of Lugalmeslam, taken by the Galileo space probe on May 7, 1997.
- Feature type: Pit crater
- Coordinates: 23.72°N 193.89°W
- Diameter: 64 kilometres (40 mi)
- Eponym: Lugalmeslam

Lugalmeslam is a central pit crater on Jupiter's largest moon Ganymede. The crater's outer rim measures approximately 64 kilometres (40 mi) in diameter, although it has been deformed in several areas.

== Naming ==
Lugalmeslam is a title from Sumerian mythology which means "King of the Underworld". According to some sources, it is an earlier name for Nergal, the Mesopotamian god of the underworld, diseases, death and war. The name was approved by the International Astronomical Union (IAU) in 1997.

The name of the crater follows the convention that surface features and craters on Ganymede be named after deities, heroes and places from Ancient Middle Eastern mythology, including Sumerian and Mesopotamian mythologies.

== Location ==
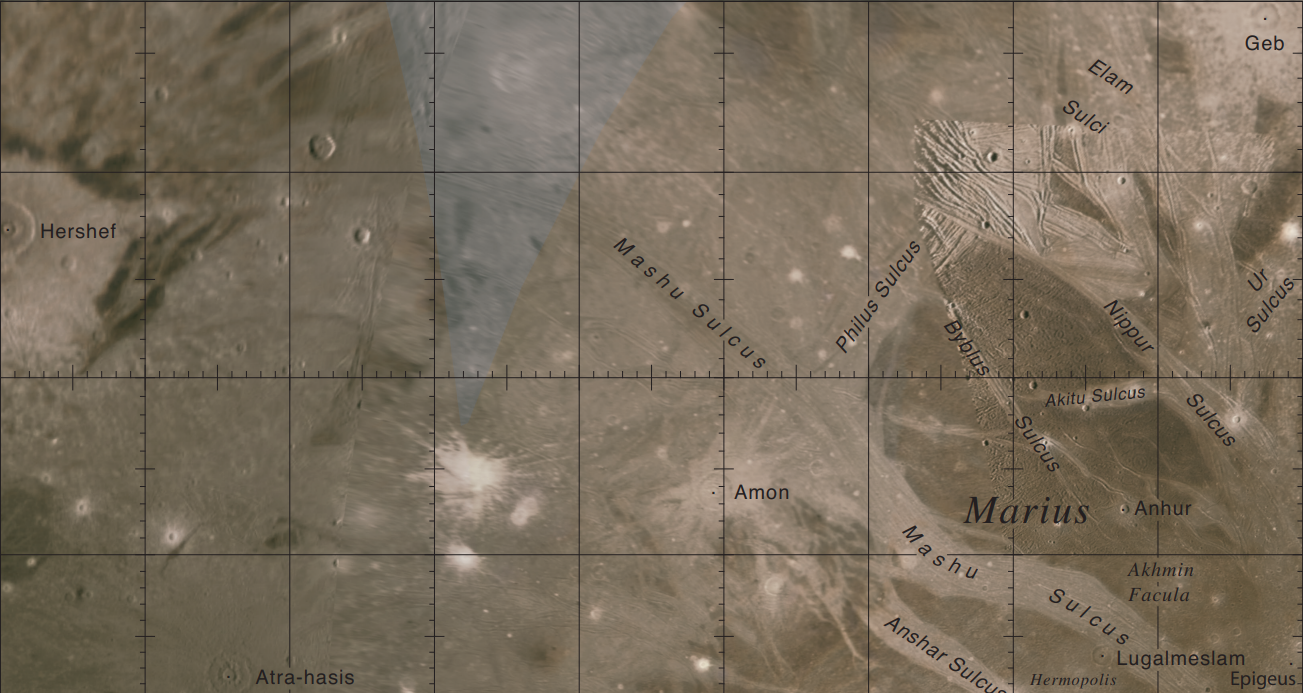
A map of Philus Sulcus quadrangle on Ganymede. Lugalmeslam is on the lower right of the map.

Lugalmeslam is located within an ancient, dark region on Ganymede known as Marius Regio. The crater lies at the boundary between the darker, older terrain of Marius Regio and the brighter, younger grooved terrain of Mashu Sulcus. The northeastern part of Lugalmeslam crater extends partly into Mashu Sulcus.

To the crater's southwest lie the surface features Anshar Sulcus and Hermopolis Facula, while far to its east is Epigeus, one of the largest recognized craters on Ganymede. To the northeast of Lugalmeslam, on the opposite side of Mashu Sulcus, Akhmin Facula is situated.

Lugalmeslam is located within the Philus Sulcus quadrangle (or section) of Ganymede (designated Jg4).

In addition, because Ganymede is in synchronous rotation as it orbits Jupiter, one hemisphere of the moon always faces its parent planet, while the other hemisphere never does. Consequently, since Lugalmeslam is located on the hemisphere that never faces Jupiter, an observer on the crater would never see Jupiter in the sky. (Note: For moons in synchronous rotation, such as Ganymede, 0° longitude corresponds to the part of the surface that always faces Jupiter. Regions between 90° W and 270° W longitude never face the moon’s parent planet.)

== Morphology ==
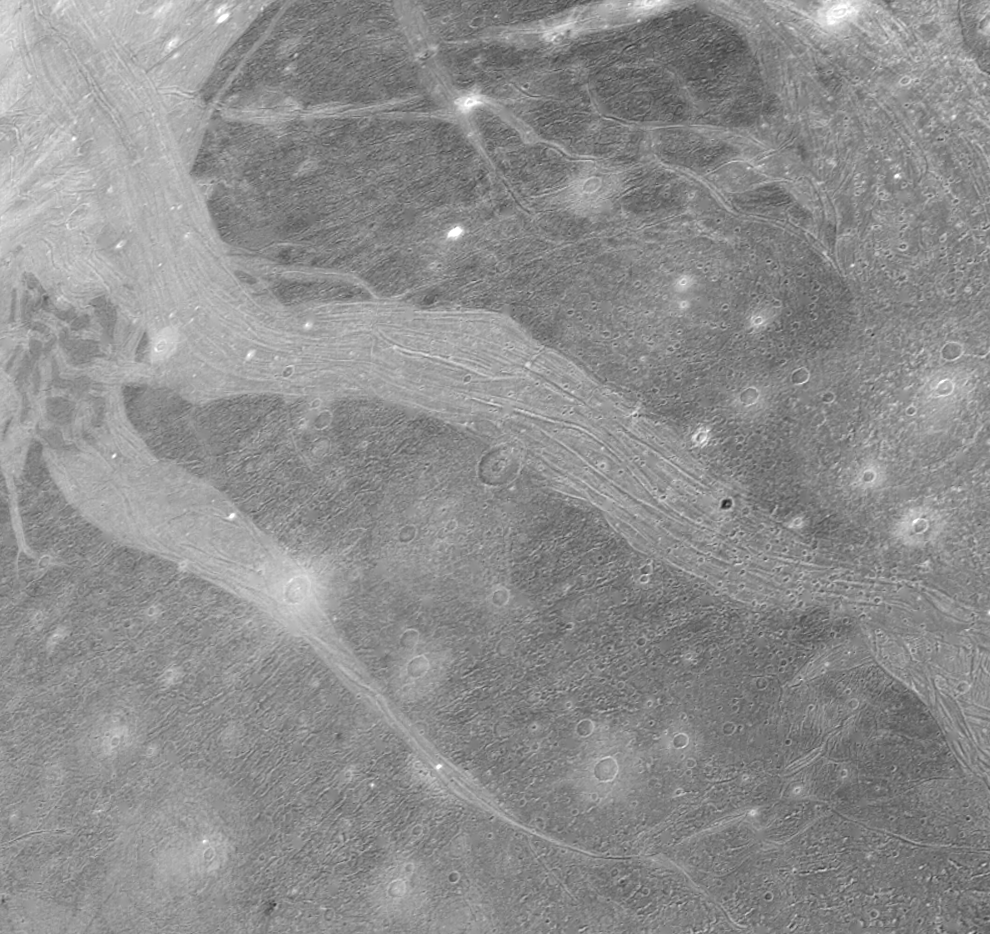
A mosaic image of Ganymede, showing Lugalmeslam (center). The bright, grooved terrain running from northwest and southeast is Mashu Sulcus, while the crater basin on the far right is Epigeus.

Lugalmeslam is an impact crater whose present morphology has been significantly modified by tectonic processes associated with the surrounding terrain. Its rim has a deformed elliptical shape, with the northeastern part extending partly into the bright terrain of Mashu Sulcus. This overlap suggests that tectonic activity in this area postdated the crater's formation and directly affected the rim, altering its original circular outline.

Despite the rim deformation, there is no evidence that Lugalmeslam was actively stretched or pulled apart by tectonic forces. The crater does not show clear signs of being deformed during tectonic activity, such as systematic stretching, grabens, or fracture belts within the crater interior. Instead, the deformation appears to be limited to the rim, resulting from regional stresses acting on an existing impact structure.

The type of tectonic activity responsible for modifying Lugalmeslam remains uncertain. The absence of extensional landforms commonly observed in other tectonically affected regions on Ganymede suggests that the processes influencing the crater were not predominantly extensional. Alternative mechanisms, such as compressional deformation or strike-slip faulting—the latter being responsible for the formation of the nearby Anshar Sulcus—may have contributed to rim disruption and degradation. There is no also evidence that cryovolcanism has influenced its geology.

The relative age of Lugalmeslam is inferred to be very old. The crater lacks well-preserved ejecta deposits and secondary craters, implying that its ray system has already been erased by long-term thermal, gravitational, or micrometeoroid-driven erosion, as well as space weathering. Domes usually only form if a crater is more than 60 kilometers wide.

Overall, Lugalmeslam is best interpreted as an ancient impact crater that has undergone substantial post-impact tectonic modification of its rim without evidence for internal resurfacing or tectonic extension of the crater itself. Further analysis is required to constrain the timing and nature of the tectonic processes responsible for its present morphology.

== Geology ==
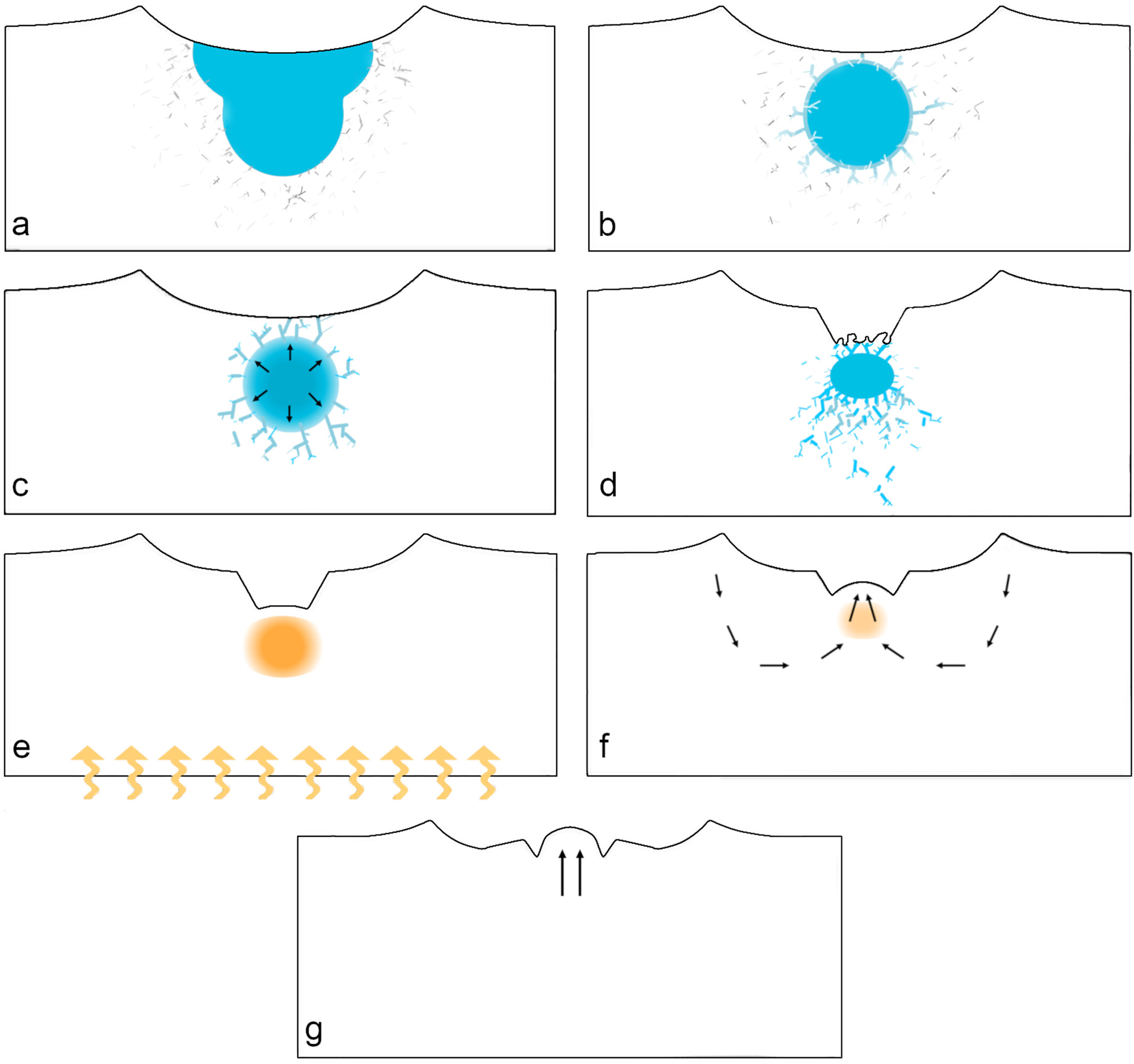
A diagram showing the steps in the formation of dome craters on icy moons. It shows how the refreezing of meltwater from meteorite impacts can cause both the formation of sinkholes and the dome-forming expansion of an icy crust.

Lugalmeslam is classified as a pit crater. According to studies, craters on Ganymede tend to evolve into either dome craters or pit craters due to crater impact meltwater expanding as it freezes, relaxation of the moon's icy crust and possible tectonic activity in the past. In general, domes usually only form if a crater has a diameter of more than 60 kilometres (37 mi).

== Exploration ==
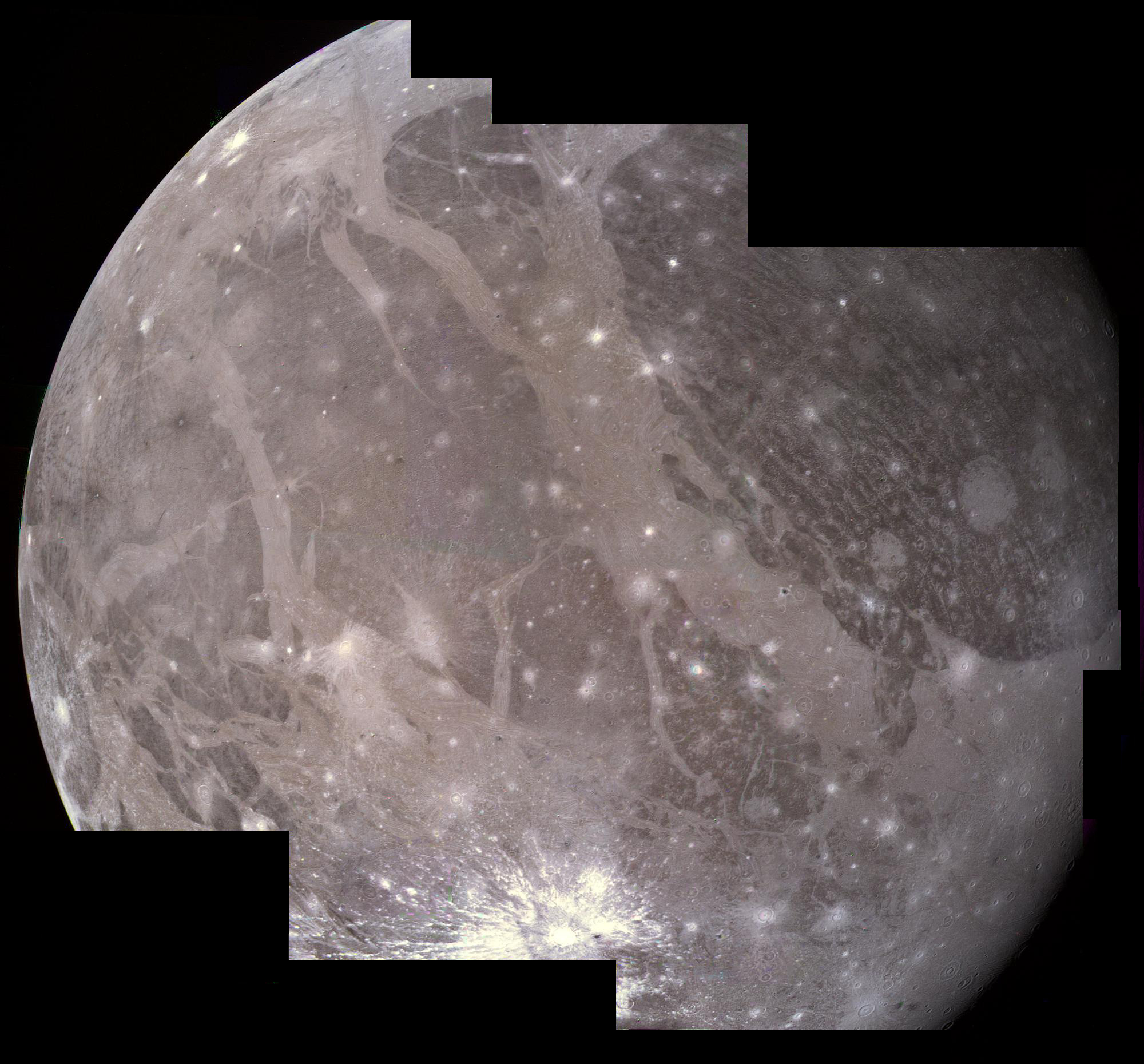
A mosaic image of Ganymede showing Lugalmeslam (slightly to the upper left from the center), taken by Voyager 2 in July 1979.

Voyager 2 became the first spacecraft to image Lugalmeslam during its flyby of Jupiter and Ganymede in July 1979. It was able to photograph Lugalmeslam in good detail with a resolution of around 1.3 kilometres (0.81 mi) per pixel.

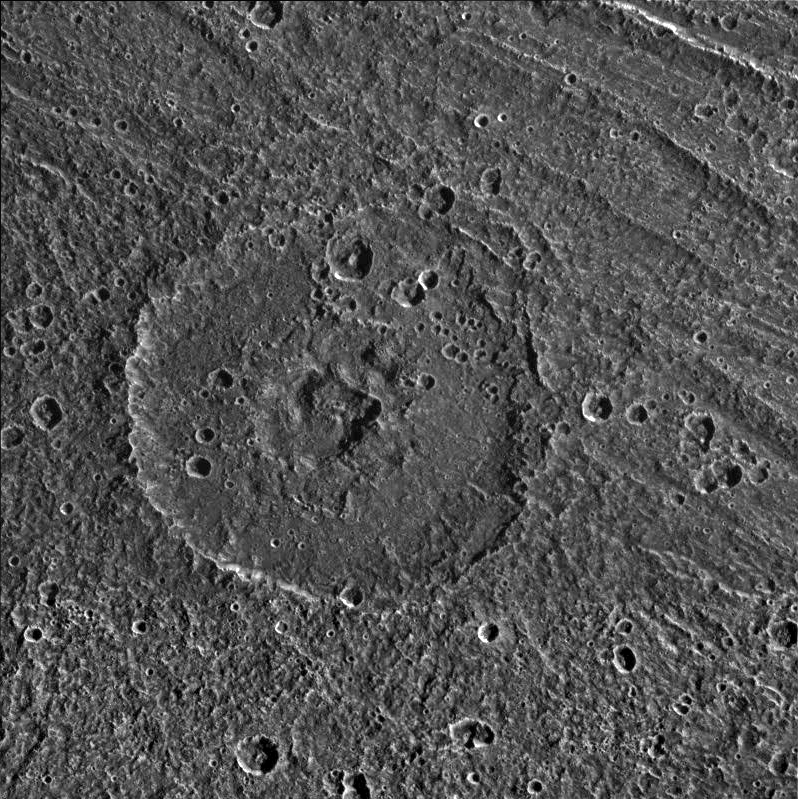
A close-up image of Lugalmeslam, taken by the Galileo space probe in May 1997. The grooved terrain to the northeast is Mashu Sulcus.

The next and final spacecraft to observe Lugalmeslam was Galileo, which orbited Jupiter from December 1995 to September 2003. Galileo conducted a targeted flyby of the crater in May 1997, allowing its cameras to resolve surface details as small as 149 metres (489 ft) per pixel. However, the images were acquired when the Sun was at a low angle relative to Ganymede's surface, which greatly exaggerated topographic relief and made intrinsic albedo differences difficult to detect. As a result, the contrast between the dark terrain of Marius Regio and the bright terrain of Mashu Sulcus is greatly reduced in Galileo's imagery, limiting detailed study of Lugalmeslam.

=== Future missions ===
The European Space Agency's (ESA) Jupiter Icy Moons Explorer (Juice) orbiter, which was launched in April 2023, is scheduled to arrive at Jupiter in July 2031. After spending approximately three and a half years orbiting Jupiter and performing multiple flybys of Europa, Callisto, and Ganymede, Juice will settle into a low polar orbit around Ganymede, allowing the probe to obtain higher-resolution images of Lugalmeslam, which may help planetary scientists determine the crater's geologic history.

== See also ==
- List of craters on Ganymede
- Meteor
