= Anshar Sulcus =

Bright region on Ganymede

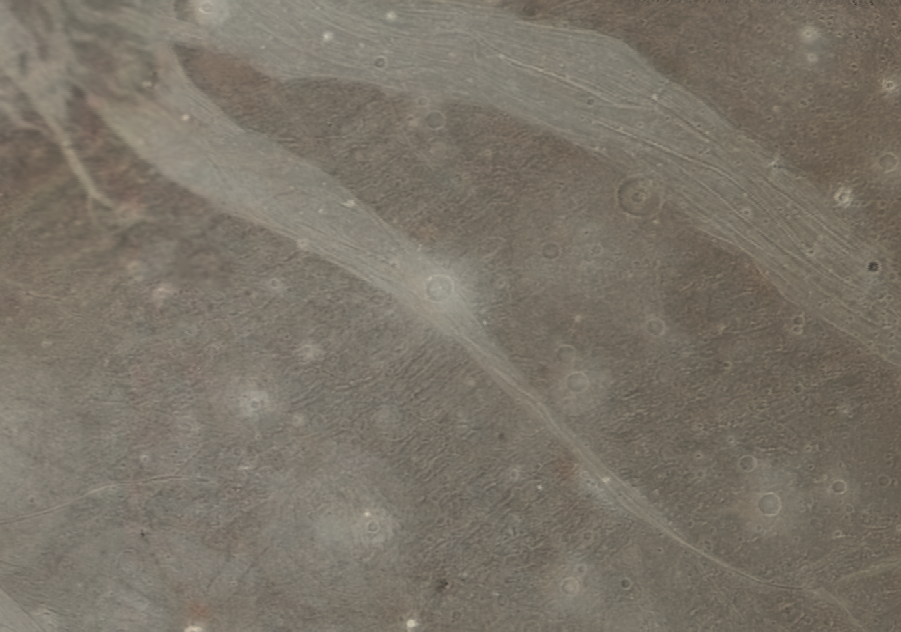
- An image of Anshar Sulcus taken by the Galileo space probe in May 7, 1997. The other sulcus in the upper right is Mashu Sulcus.
- Feature type: Sulcus
- Coordinates: 18.90°N 198.70°W
- Length: 1,372 kilometres (853 mi)
- Eponym: Anshar

Anshar Sulcus is a grooved terrain on Jupiter's largest moon Ganymede. It is a trough that is approximately 1,372 kilometres (853 mi) long. Its surface is younger and brighter than the darker, older material covering the areas that surround it.

== Naming ==
Anshar Sulcus is named after the ancient Mesopotamian mythological entity called Anshar, the primordial personification of the sky who existed before the gods were born. Anshar was paired with the female personification of the earth called Kishar, and in some myths, as the personification of the sky, he served as the celestial home of Lahmu and Lahamu.

The International Astronomical Union (IAU) chose this name in line with the convention that surface features and craters on Ganymede should be named after deities, figures and place from Ancient Middle Eastern mythology, including Mesopotamian mythology.

The IAU approved the name for Anshar Sulcus in 1979.

== Location ==
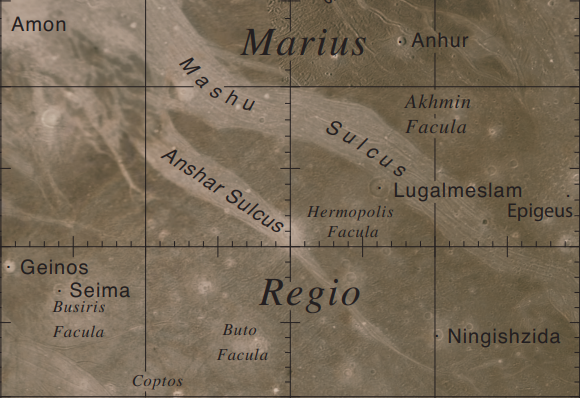
A map of Anshar Sulcus.

Anshar Sulcus is a band of bright, grooved terrain located entirely within a dark, ancient region on Ganymede called Marius Regio.

The sulcus begins on the southern side of the midpoint of another sulcus called Masha Sulcus, near a ray crater called Amon. It then enters Marius Regio from the northwest, and cuts its way into the dark region from the northwest to the southeast, roughly bisecting Marius into two.

Halfway along the course of Anshar Sulcus, an unnamed ray crater can be found, flanked by two faculae—Buto Facula, a palimpsest or "ghost crater" to the southwest, and Hermopolis Facula to the northeast. Past this middle point, Anshar Sulcus rapidly becomes narrower.

The sulcus terminates roughly one-third of the way into Marius Regio, ending near a crater called Ningishzida.

Anshar Sulcus is located within two quadrangles (or sections) of Ganymede. The northwestern part of the sulcus is part of the Philus quadrangle (designated Jg4), while its southwest portion is located within the Uruk quadrangle (designated Jg8).

Due to Ganymede's synchronous rotation around its parent planet Jupiter, the side of the moon where Anshar Sulcus is located never faces Jupiter. Therefore, an observer on Anshar Sulcus will never see Jupiter as well.

== Natural History ==
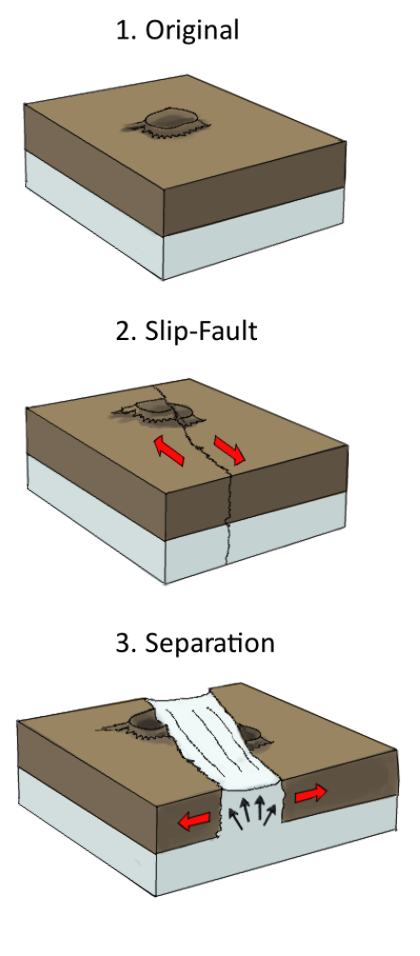
An illustration of how Anshar Sulcus probably formed, determined through the interpretation of the current conditions of its topography.

Like most of Ganymede’s bright regions, Anshar Sulcus is an example of a bright and young terrain characterized by multiple sets of ridges and grooves running almost parallel to each other. Studies strongly suggest that grooved terrains on Ganymede are created through four tectonic stages. First, tectonic activity reactivates within the ancient regions of the moon. Second, deformation of the preexisting terrain by extensional tectonism starts to happens. Third, cryovolcanic resurfacing might occur during the process, causing further resurfacing. And lastly, the cross-cutting of dark regions by more recent lines of grooved terrain starts to extensively appear.

According to a study by Ianiri, Mitri, Sulcanese, Chiarolanza and Cioria, by interpreting its geological features such as its boundaries with Marius Regio and the displacement of craters, Anshar Sulcus’ grooved terrain specifically formed through two tectonic stages. First, a right-lateral strike-slip motion split the dark terrain into two parts, setting the stage for the sulcus. Later, crustal spreading occurred as the regions pulled apart. The grooves formed when the newly uplifted crust fractured and tilted while still solid.

== Geology ==
An image of the Anshar Sulcus (red arrow) and its surrounding regions, taken by Voyager 2 in July 1979,

Anshar Sulcus is a very bright, young and relatively smooth feature that is surrounded on all sides by the darker, older and more rugged Marius Regio. The zones where these younger, grooved terrains meet the darker and older areas can often be studied to reveal complex age relationships between the highly contrasting light and dark terrains. In many images of Ganymede, younger, sinuous grooves like Anshar Sulcus can be clearly seen cutting across and overwriting the older terrains of dark areas like Marius Regio. The fresh, clean water ice released from beneath Ganymede’s crust at zones such as Anshar Sulcus then reflects a large amount of sunlight, making these areas appear brighter than their surroundings. This continual erasure and recoating of ancient surfaces by tectonic activity is very common across Ganymede and it plays a major role in shaping the moon's appearance.

The bright terrains on Ganymede are analogous to the dark lunar maria on the Earth's Moon in terms of age as both are thought to be the youngest parts of their respective moons' surfaces. However, instead of being composed of basaltic rock like the dark regions of the Moon’s surface, it is substituted on Ganymede by bright water ice. The dark terrains on Ganymede, in turn, are analogous to the bright Lunar highlands which are older than the surface of Lunar maria.

== Exploration ==
As of 2025, three spacecraft were able to image Anshar Sulcus: Voyager 1, Voyager 2 and Galileo.

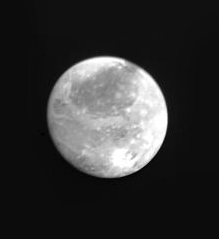
A distant image of Ganymede, taken by Voyager 1 in February 1979. Anshar Sulcus is barely visible on the left.

Voyager 1's images of Anshar Sulcus was taken in February 1979 as it was approaching Jupiter and its moons. The probe was still several millions of kilometers away from Ganymede when it took photographs of Anshar Sulcus, so its camera yielded only low-resolution images of the sulcus.

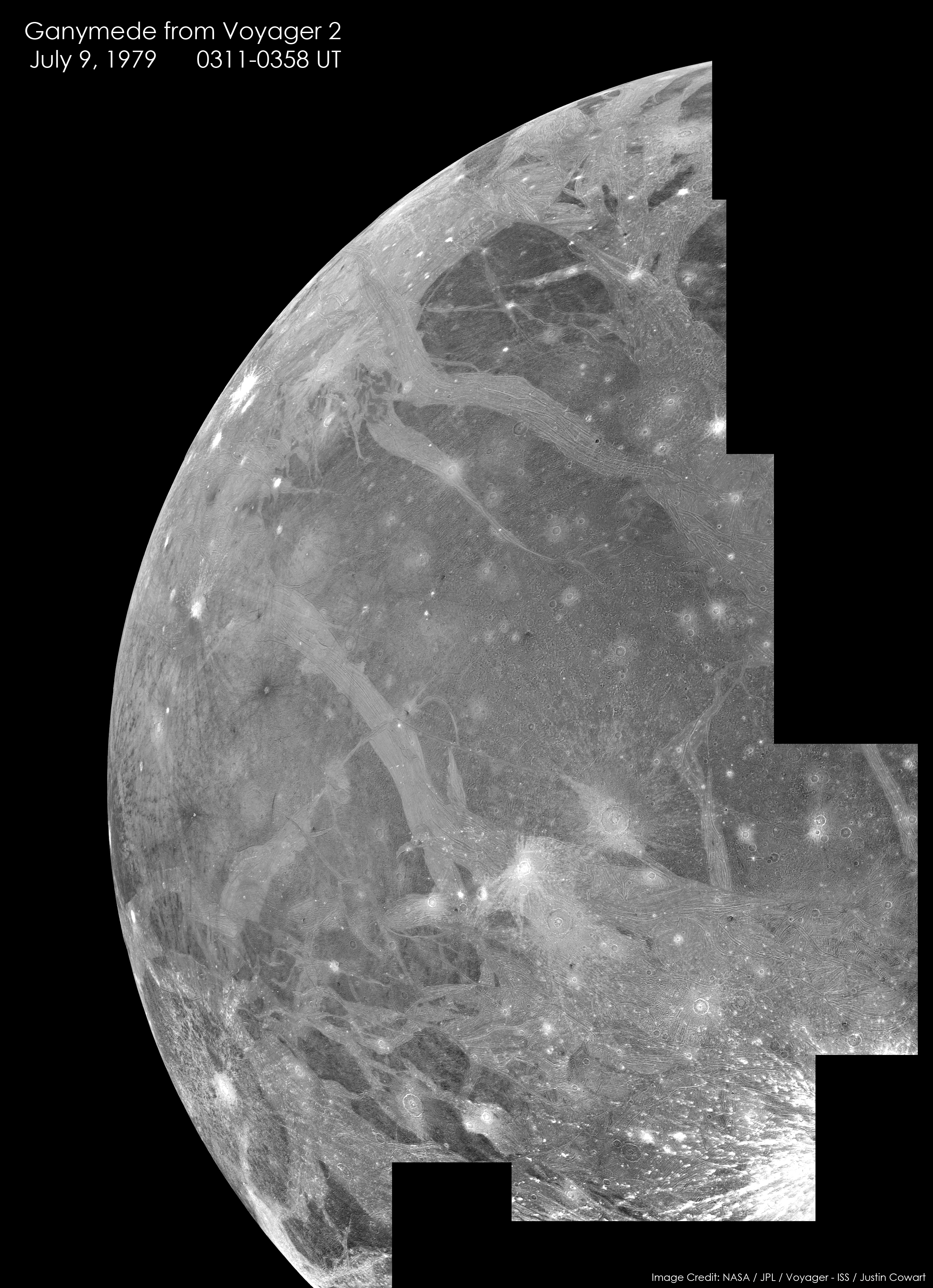
A mosaic image of Ganymede's side that always faces away from Jupiter, taken by Voyager 2 in July 1979. Anshar Sulcus (slight to the upper left from the center) can be seen along with many other bright sulci and dark regiones.

Voyager 2 performed a short flyby of Jupiter and Ganymede in July 1979. It was able to image Anshar Sulcus in good details along with everything else in its vicinity, but it was not possible to take any close-up images during its fleeting visit.

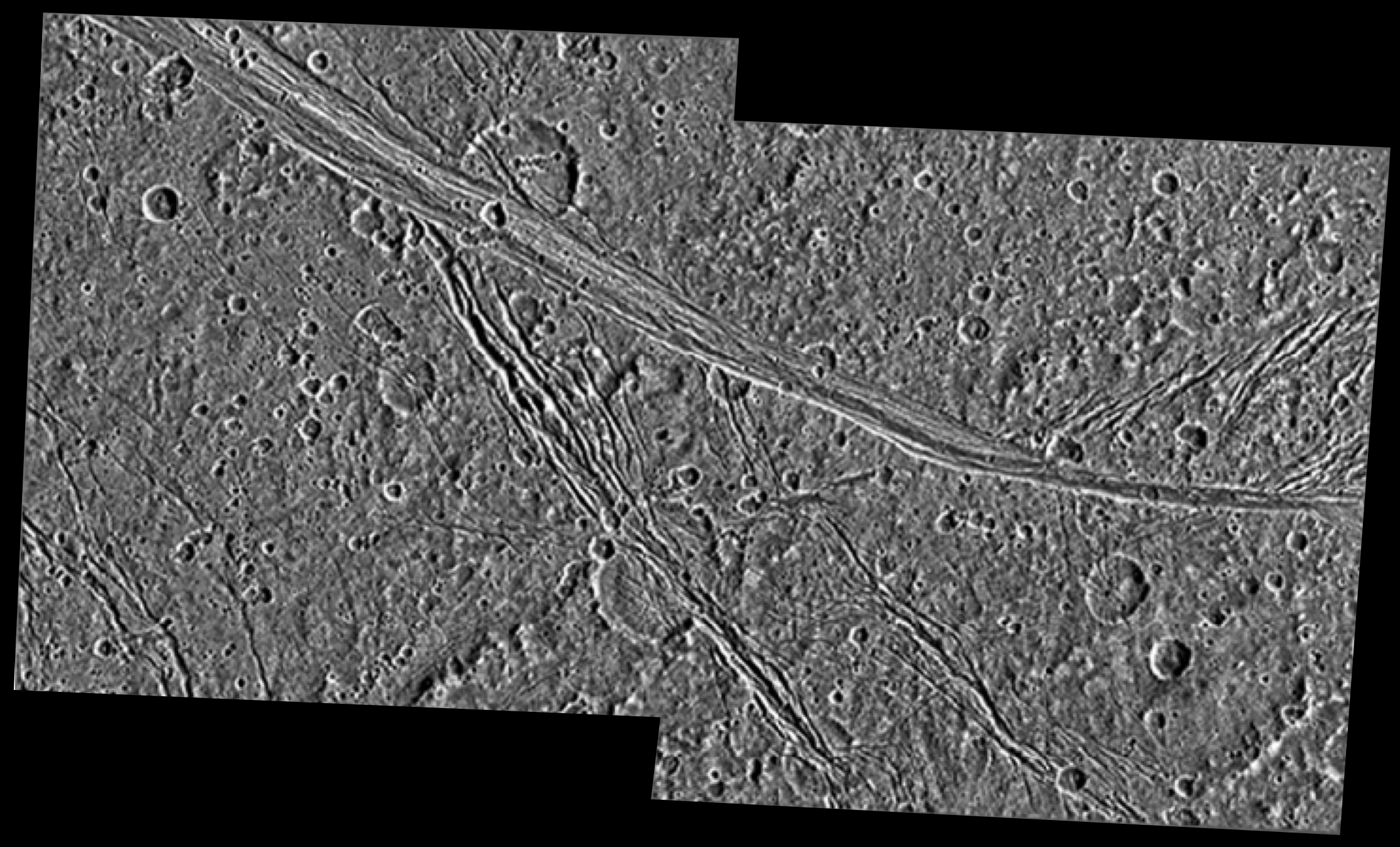
An image of the eastern portion Anshar Sulcus

Galileo provided the first close-up images of Anshar Sulcus when it orbited Jupiter from December 1995 to September 2003. The probe was able to image the eastern portion of the sulcus (12°N, 169°E) with a resolution of 152 meters per pixel. The images were used by several studies to determine how Ganymede's sulci probably formed. The other parts of Anshar Sulcus were not photographed by Galileo.

=== Future missions ===
The European Space Agency's (ESA) space probe named Jupiter Icy Moons Explorer (Juice), which was launched in April 2023, is expected to arrive at Jupiter in July 2031. After spending around three and a half years orbiting Jupiter and performing multiple flybys of Europa, Callisto and Ganymede, Juice will settle into a low polar orbit around Ganymede at a distance of as low as 500 kilometres (310 mi). Juice is expected to send some of the highest-resolution images of Anshar Sulcus.

== See also ==
- Lugalmeslam
- Sulcus (geology)
