= Marius Regio =

Dark region on Ganymede

- A Mercator projection map of Marius Regio. To the upper right is Galileo Regio, and to the lower left is Mellote Regio.
- Feature type: Regio
- Coordinates: 2.50°S 187.70°W
- Length: 4,940 kilometres (3,070 mi)
- Eponym: Simon Marius

Marius Regio is a major surface feature on Jupiter's moon Ganymede. It is an elongated feature composed of several dark, ancient areas crisscrossed and broken into several lobes by many younger, brighter sulci.

== Naming ==
Marius Regio is named after Simon Marius, a German astronomer who is considered the co-discoverer of Jupiter's four largest moons—Io, Europa, Ganymede and Callisto—along with Galileo Galilei who discovered them independently. Simon Marius was the one who suggested that the moons be named after the various extramarital lovers of Zeus (Jupiter in Roman mythology), which is still in use to this day. The name for Marius Regio was approved by the IAU in 1979.

The International Astronomical Union (IAU) named the dark areas on Ganymede (known as regiones) after astronomers who made significant contributions to the discovery of Jupiter's moons.

== Geography ==
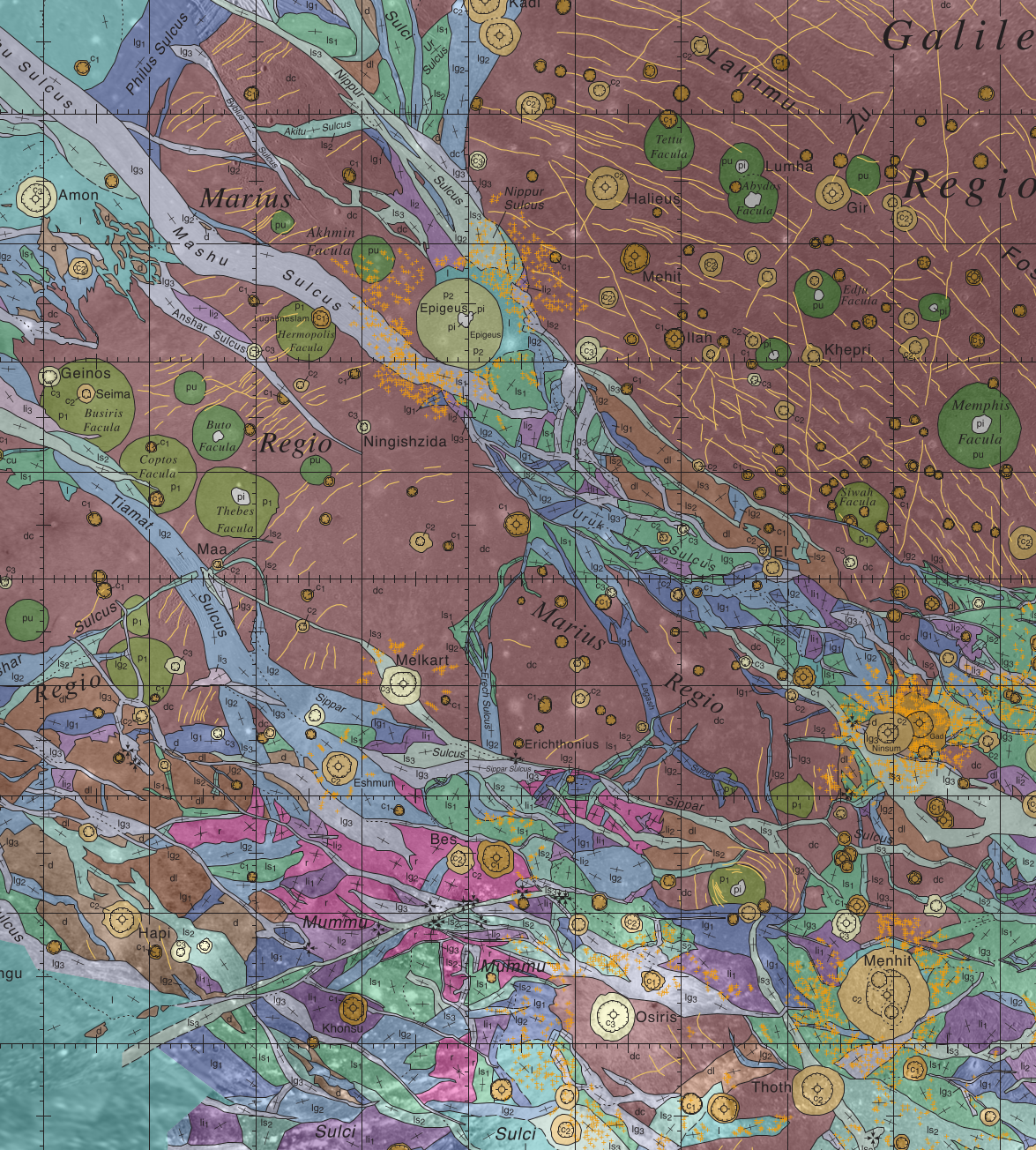
A color-coded geographic map of Marius Regio and its neighboring regiones and areas.

Marius Regio's northernmost boundary is marked by Philus Sulcus and Elam Sulcus. To the east, Marius Regio is separated from Galileo Regio by Uruk and Nippur Sulci, while Mashu Sulcus marks its western boundary. To the southwest, it is separated from Mellote Regio by Tiamat Sulcus. The regio's southern boundary is marked by Sippar Sulcus.

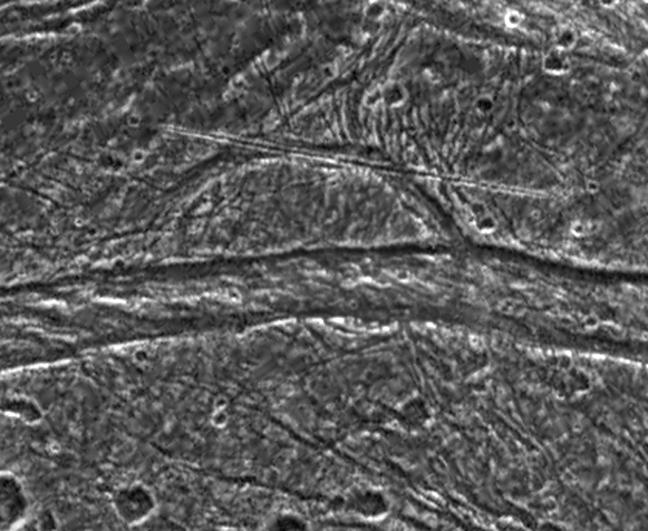
A close up image of the northern lobe of Marius Regio near its boundary with Nippur Sulcus, taken by the Galileo spacecraft in November 1997. The younger, smoother grooved sulcus cuts through the older region around it.

The northern part of Marius Regio is separated into its own lobe by Mashu Sulcus. This lobe is crisscrossed and dissected by narrower sulci such as Byblus Sulcus and Akitu Sulcus. One of the largest recognized craters on Ganymede's surface, called Epigeus, is located to the southeast of this lobe.

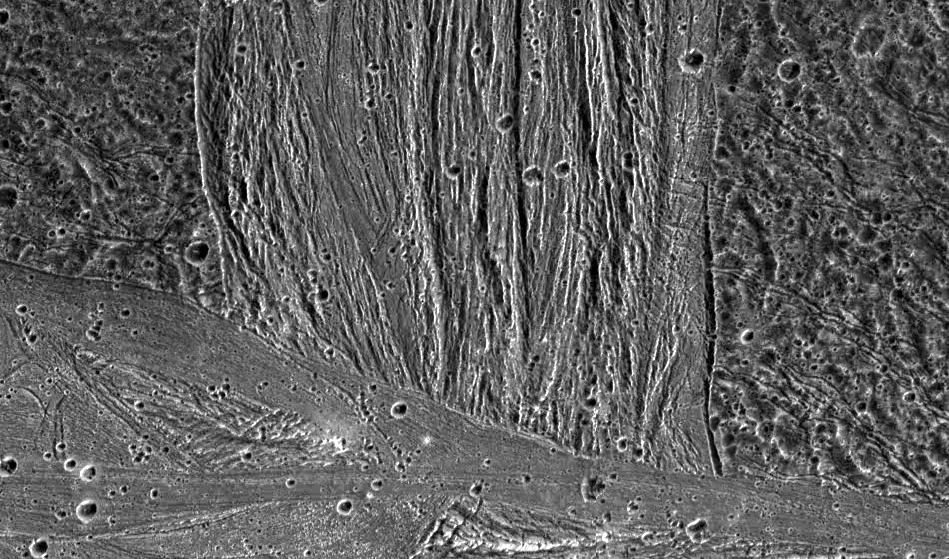
A close up image of the segment of Marius Regio where the younger, grooved Erech Sulcus (middle) cuts through the older regio, and where it meets with Sippar Sulcus (below), taken by Galileo in May 1997.

The central, main lobe of Marius regio is split into three uneven segments by Erech Sulcus and Lagash Sulcus, both of which run from north to south. The western segment (which is the largest part) is partly split by the Anshar Sulcus running from the northwest and southeast. The area surrounding it is noticeably filled with many furrows.

Marius Regio is saturated with countless of craters. The regio hosts both bright, young craters, and dark, and old ones, but only a handful have names. Such named craters include the ray crater Geinos to the west, the deformed ancient Lugalmeslam to the north, the bright ray crater Melkart to the southwest, and the strained and damaged Erichthonius crater to the south.

The western side of Marius Regio is occupied by several faculae (bright circular features), of which many are probably palimpsests, or "ghost craters"—ancient craters that are so old that their crater walls have slumped and their floors have relaxed and risen isostatically, causing the crater to flatten and smooth out. The faculae with names include Busiris Facula and Buto Facula (which are officially considered as palimpsests), and Akhmin Facula, Coptos Facula, Hermopolis Facula and Thebes Facula, which are not yet fully confirmed as palimpsests.

Marius Regio is located in the middle of the longitude of Ganymede's surface that never faces Jupiter (180° longitude) as a consequence of the moon's synchronous rotation. This means that an observer on any part of Marius Regio will never see Jupiter.

The regio is so long that it crosses into five quadrangles of Ganymede, namely Philus, Uruk, Tiamat, and Osiris (designated Jg4, Jg8, Jg9, Jg12 respectively) quadrangles. A small portion of the easternmost side of the regio is part of the Memphis Facula quadrangle (designated Jg7).

To Marius Regio's southeast, just outside its boundaries lie the major, bright ray crater Osiris, and a large dome crater called Menhit.

== Geology ==
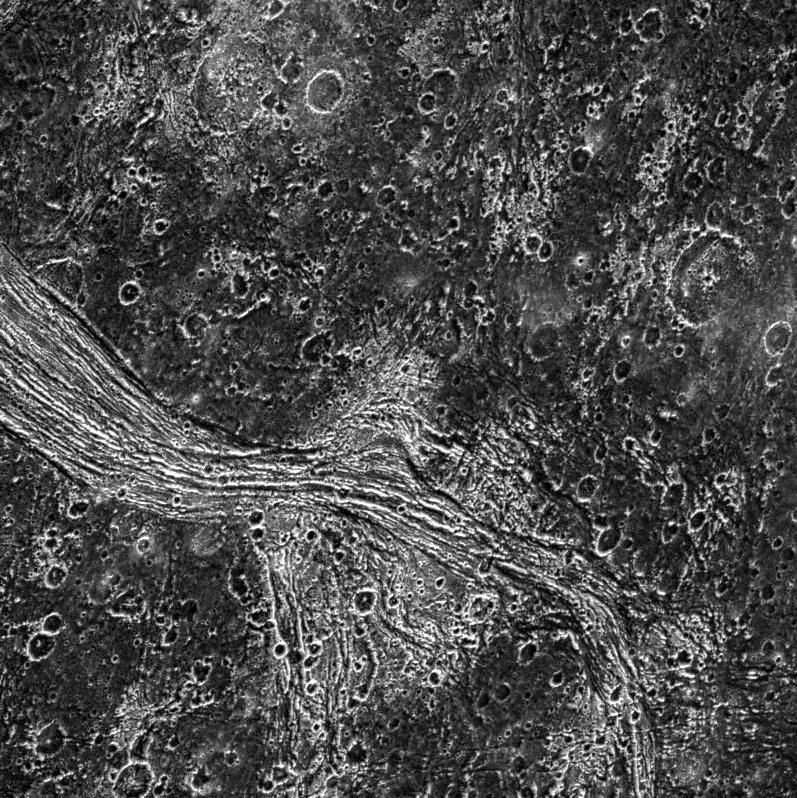
A close up image of Marius Regio and Lagash Sulcus. The younger, and brighter grooved sulcus can be seen clearly cutting through and the dark, older, more rugged and heavily cratered terrain of the regio. This image was taken by Galileo in July 1998.

Marius Regio is believe to be one of the oldest areas of Ganymede's surface, similar to other dark regions elsewhere on the moon. It is a very rugged area full of craters, rifts and troughs of various sizes. The dark shades of the regio probably due to dark material delivered by falling asteroids and comets over the course of the regio's long history.

Closeup images of Marius Regio reveal that it is extremely rugged and saturated with impact craters and furrows like its neighboring Galileo Regio. Its terrain shows that it is very ancient, and that Ganymede had a very violent past due to the countless meteors and comets that have crashed into its surface throughout the moon's long existence. However, due to tectonic activity on Ganymede, many portions of the ancient regio have been resurfaced by younger sulci, which are thought to be areas where fresher water ice upwells from underneath the moon's surface. Fresh, clean ice reflects a lot of sunlight, making the sulci look a lot brighter compared their surroundings.

Dark regions on Ganymede can be thought of as analogous to the brighter highlands on the Earth's Moon in terms of age as both are considered the oldest parts of their respective moons. However, instead of volcanic basalts like on Earth's Moon's Lunar mare, the material that makes up newer terrain and surfaces on Ganymede is water ice.

== Relationship to other regiones ==
In 2020, planetary scientists Hirata, Suetsugu, and Ohtsuki proposed that Ganymede was struck by a massive impactor roughly 4 billion years ago. The collision may have been powerful enough to produce a global, multi-ring structure—one even larger than any confirmed impact basin in the Solar System. By examining the concentric patterns of the furrow systems within Ganymede's dark terrains, including those in Marius Regio, the researchers suggested that Marius, Barnard, Galileo, Nicholson, and Perrine Regiones are likely remnants of a single ancient basin. Over the course of Ganymede's geological history, tectonic processes and resurfacing by younger, brighter grooved terrain (the sulci) fragmented these dark regions into separate blocks and erased much of the original ring system. The features visible today may therefore be the surviving portions of this primordial giant basin. If future missions confirm this hypothesis, the impact would rank among the largest ever identified in the Solar System.

== Exploration ==
Marius Regio has been photographed by three spacecraft—Voyager 1, Voyager 2, and Galileo.

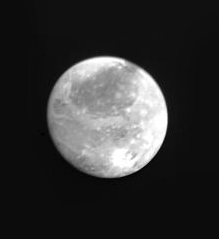
A distant image of Ganymede's hemisphere that permanently faces away from Jupiter. Marius Regio is the elongated region running from west to east near the center of the image.

Voyager 1 became the first spacecraft to image Marius Regio as it approached Jupiter and Ganymede during the final two days of February 1979. By the time the probe made its closest approach to Ganymede on March 5 1979, Marius Regio had rotated onto the moon's far side, preventing the spacecraft from obtaining high-resolution images of the region.

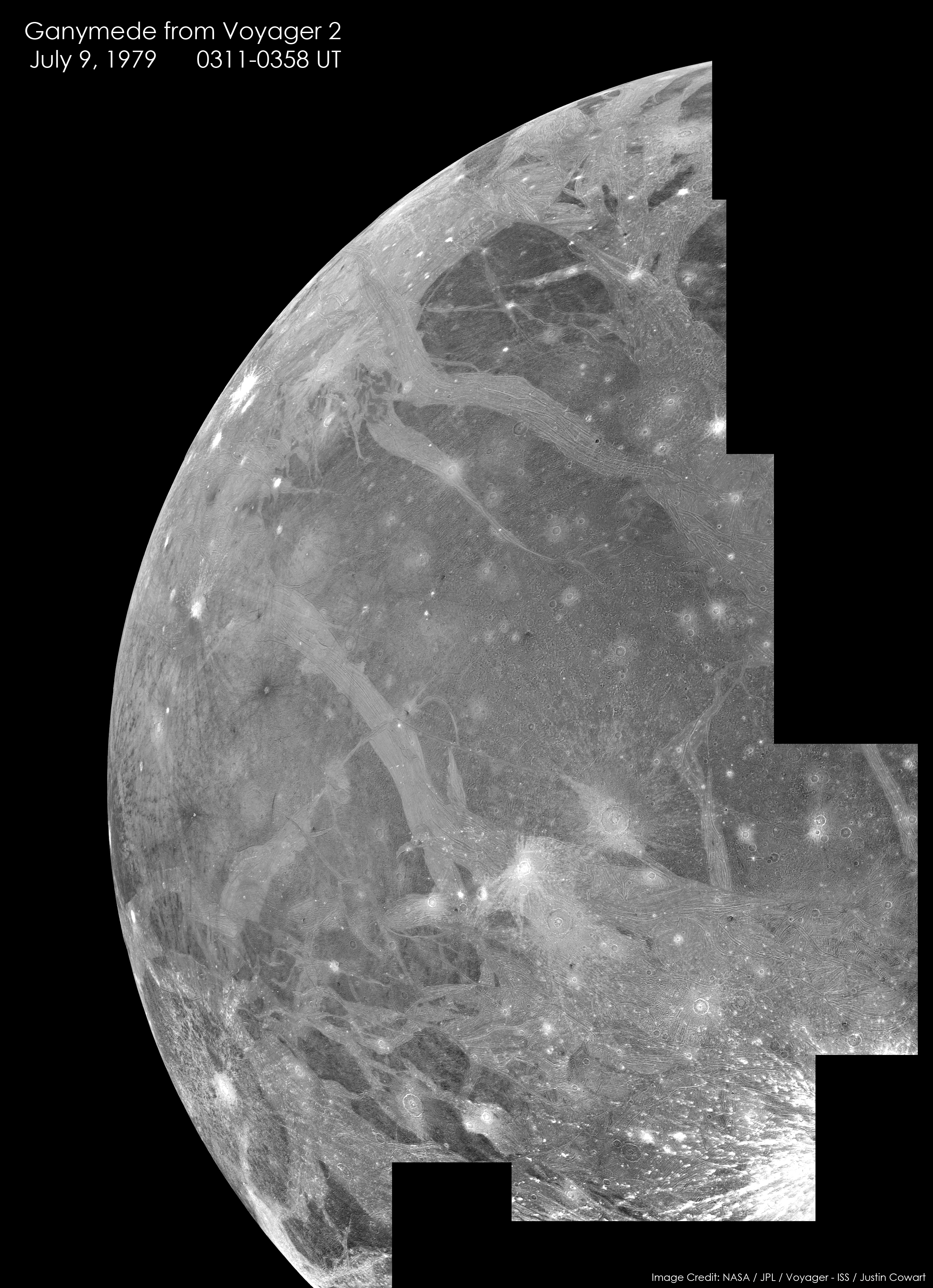
A mosaic image of Ganymede centered on Marius Regio, taken by Voyager 2 in July 1979

Voyager 2 was the first probe to send back clear images of Marius Regio when it flew by Jupiter and its moon Ganymede in July 1979. The regio was in an excellent position during Voyager 2's brief visit. By contrast, Voyager 1 was not able to observe Marius Regio because its flight trajectory placed the region on Ganymede's night side when it arrived.

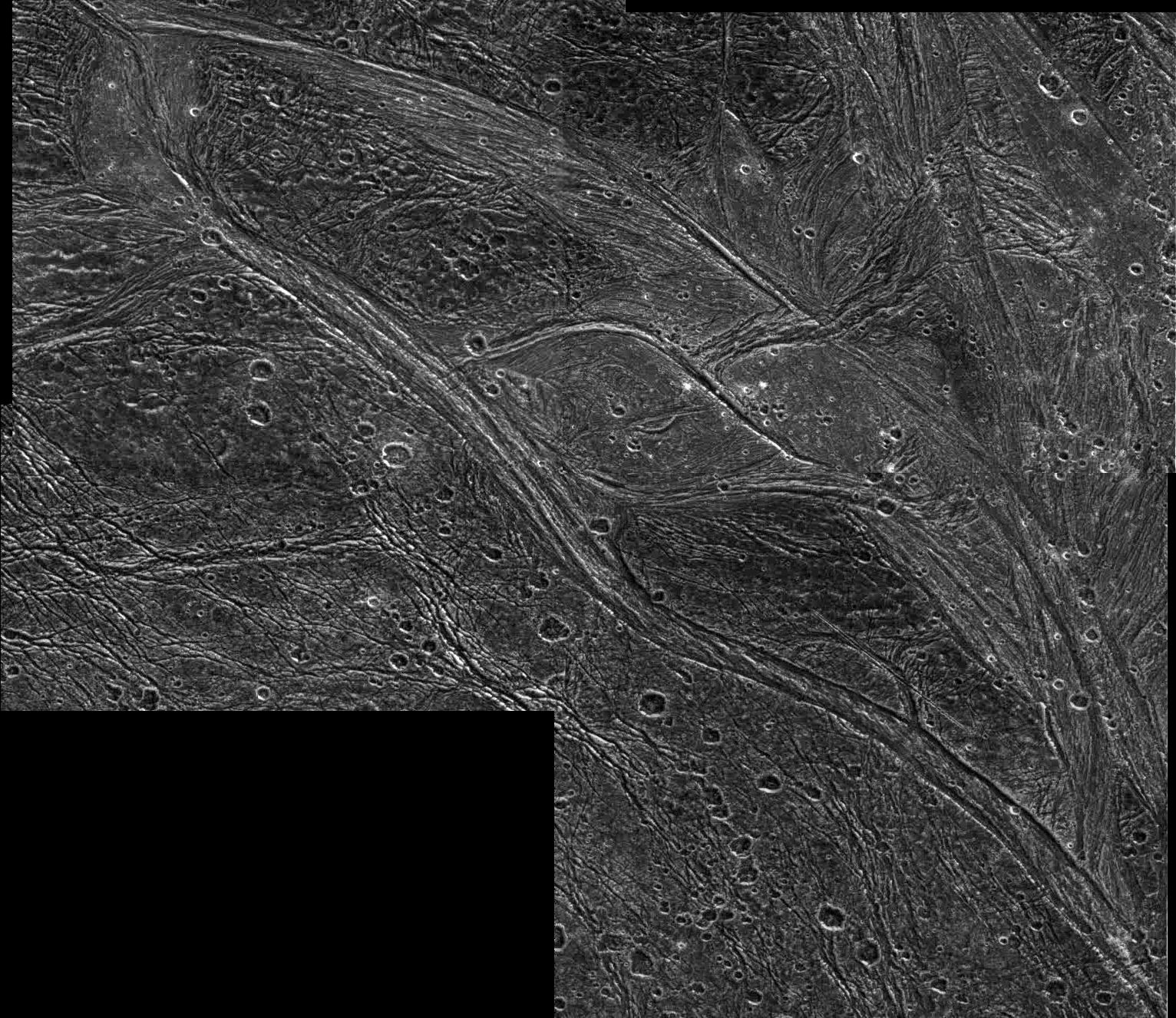
A mosaic, closeup image of the boundary between Marius Regio and Nippur Sulcus, taken by Galileo in September 1996. It shows an extensive mix of old, heavily cratered surface, and brighter, younger, grooved terrain.

The Galileo probe was able to photograph Marius Regio several times as it orbited Jupiter from December 1995 to September 2003. Its Solid State Imaging system was able to provided several closeups of the extremely rugged terrain of Marius. As of 2025, Galileo has provided the highest resolution images of Marius Regio.

=== Future missions ===
The European Space Agency's (ESA) launched a space probe called Jupiter Icy Moons Explorer (Juice) to Jupiter in April 2023. It is scheduled to arrive at Jupiter in July 2031 and after spending around three and a half years in orbit around Jupiter and performing multiple flybys of Europa, Callisto and Ganymede, Juice will settle into a low orbit around Ganymede at a distance of just 500 kilometres (310 mi). Juice is expected to be able to see Marius Regio in great detail and resolution.

== Gallery ==
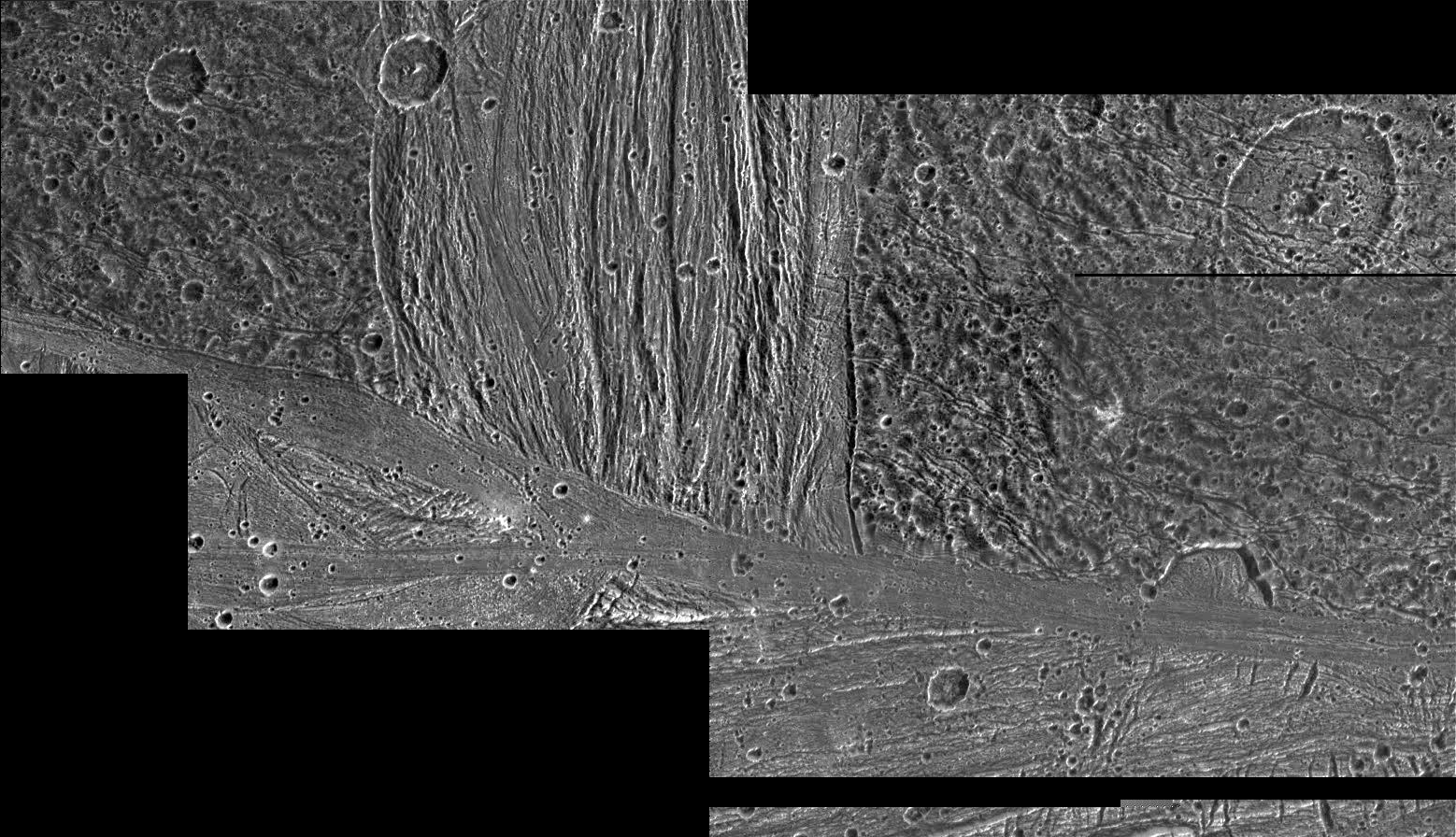
A wide view of the junction between Erech Sulcus and Sippar Sulcus, taken by Galileo in May 1997. The crater in the upper right is Erichthonius.
