= Nippur Sulcus =

Bright region on Ganymede

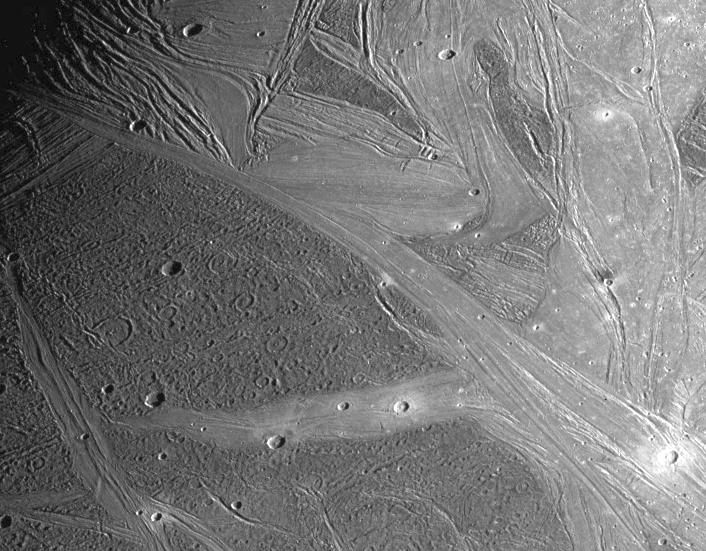
- An image of Nippur Sulcus (running from top left to bottom right), taken by the Galileo space probe on May 7, 1997. The dark area to the left is Marius Regio while the trough "branching" to the left is Akitu Sulcus.
- Feature type: Sulcus
- Coordinates: 35.41°N 198.00°W
- Length: 1,425 kilometres (885 mi)
- Eponym: Nippur

Nippur Sulcus is a grooved terrain on Jupiter's moon Ganymede. It is a trough that runs for approximately 1,425 kilometres (885 mi) across the moon's surface. Its surface is thought to be younger than the darker materials found in other regions elsewhere on the moon.

== Naming ==
Nippur Sulcus is named after an ancient Mesopotamian city called Nippur, the center of worship of Enlil, who was the supreme god of the Sumerian pantheon. The International Astronomical Union (IAU) chose this name in line with the theme that surface features and craters on Ganymede be named after divinities, heroes and places from Ancient Middle Eastern mythologies, including Mesopotamian mythology. The name was approved by the IAU in 1985.

== Location ==
Nippur Sulcus is located between two dark regions on Ganymede—Marius Regio to the west, and Galileo Regio to the East.

Nippur Sulcus terminates at Philus Sulcus to the northeast, Ur Sulcus to the north, and Uruk Sulcus to the southeast. The massive crater Epigeus (one of the largest craters on Ganymede) straddles the boundary between Nippur Sulcus and Marius Regio to the southeast.

== Geology and Characteristic ==
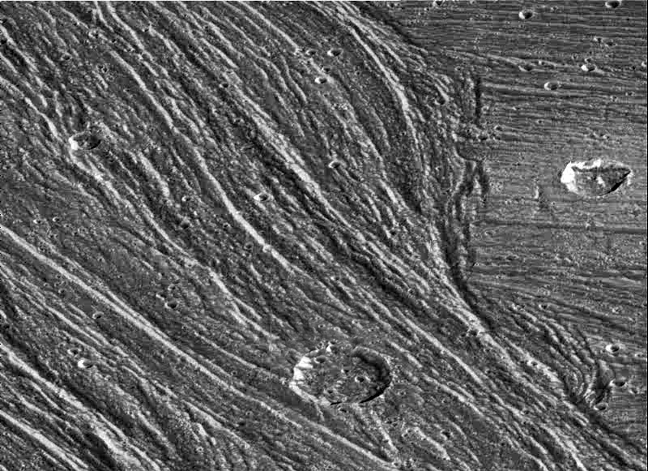
A close up image of a section of Nippur Sulcus, taken by the Galileo spacecraft in November 1997. The younger, smoother trending groove cuts through the older region on the right.

Like many bright regions on Ganymede, Nippur Sulcus is an example of a bright terrain region which characteristically exhibits multiple sets of ridges and grooves. The intersections of these aforementioned bright, grooved terrains and darker, older terrains can reveal complex age relationships between them. In many images of Ganymede taken by space probes, younger sinuous trending grooves can be clearly seen cutting through older terrains and apparently destroying them in the process. This process of erasure and overlapping of older terrain by newer, fresher terrain through tectonic activities is commonplace throughout the moon's surface and is greatly responsible in determining how the moon looks. In the case of Nippur Sulcus, it erased the dark terrain that previously connected Galileo Regio and Marius Regio, forming a boundary between the two.

Bright terrains on Ganymede are analogous in age to the dark lunar maria on Earth’s Moon, as both represent the youngest regions on their respective surfaces. Conversely, Ganymede’s dark terrains are analogous to the Moon’s bright highlands, which are older than the maria. However, the basaltic lava that formed the Moon’s maria is instead replaced by water ice in Ganymede’s grooved terrain.

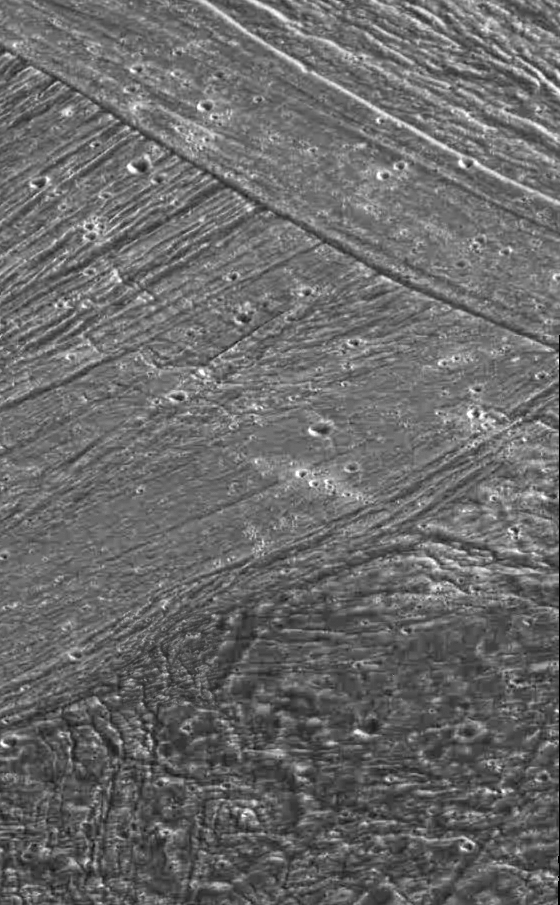
A close up image of the northern portion of Nippur Sulcus where it inters with the Philus Sulcus (left), taken by the Galileo spacecraft in November 1997. The two younger, grooved terrains overlap the older Marius Region (bottom) and each other.

A band of exceptionally smooth material marks the boundary between Philus and Nippur Sulcus. Structural patterns near the junction of Marius Regio and Philus Sulcus indicate right-lateral motion, consistent with the rightward shear deformation of an elongated crater observed within Marius Regio.

== Age ==
Based on how Nippur Sulcus cross-cuts Philus Sulcus, it can be said that Nippur is younger than Philus Sulcus, although the actual age of the two has not yet been determined.

== Exploration ==
As of 2025, two spacecraft were able to image Nippur Sulcus in good detail: Voyager 2 and the Galileo space probe.

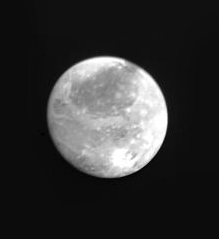
A distant image of Ganymede, taken by Voyager 1 in February 1979. Nippur Sulcus is visible in the upper left of the moon.

Although Voyager 1 was the first spacecraft to observe and image Nippur Sulcus, it was still several million kilometers from Ganymede at the time. As a result, it obtained only low-resolution images of the region, which provided little scientific value.

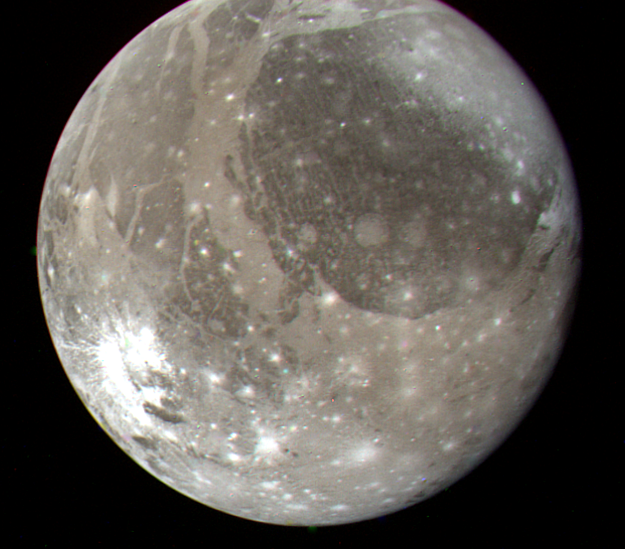
Nippur Sulcus (bright region slightly to the upper left) in between the darker Marius Regio (left), and Galileo Regio (right), imaged by Voyager 2 in July 1979

Voyager 2 only did a single flyby of Jupiter and Ganymede in July 1979, but it managed to send back the first clear images of Nippur Sulcus. Nippur was at an excellent angle and viewing position when the probe passed by because it was fully illuminated and near the center of the moon’s disc in most photos.

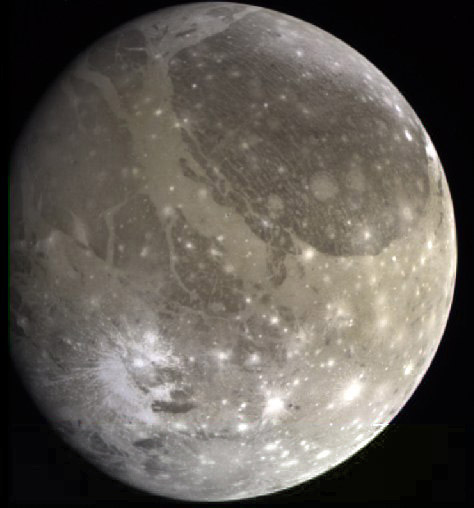
Another clear image of Nippur Sulcus (slightly to the upper left)) and its surroundings, imaged by Galileo in June 1996

Galileo was able to pass close to Nippur Sulcus several times, allowing it to see its groove in very high resolution. This allowed scientists to study and determine the nature and history of Ganymede's evolution. Galileo was also able to image the sulcus when the Sun was at a low angle, allowing scientists to better see its features because it was in strong relief due to shadows that were cast. The images it sent were much more detailed than what Voyager managed. As of 2025, the images that the Galileo probe returned are the best available images of Nippur Sulcus.

=== Future missions ===
The European Space Agency (ESA) launched the space probe Jupiter Icy Moons Explorer (Juice) in April 2023, and it is scheduled to arrive at Jupiter in July 2031. After spending around three and a half years in orbit around Jupiter and performing multiple flybys of Europa, Callisto and Ganymede, Juice will settle into a low polar orbit around Ganymede at a distance of just 500 kilometres (310 mi). Juice is expected to send images of Nippur Sulcus that are even better than Galileo's close up images.

== See also ==
Sulcus (geology)
