= Byblus Sulcus =

Bright region on Ganymede

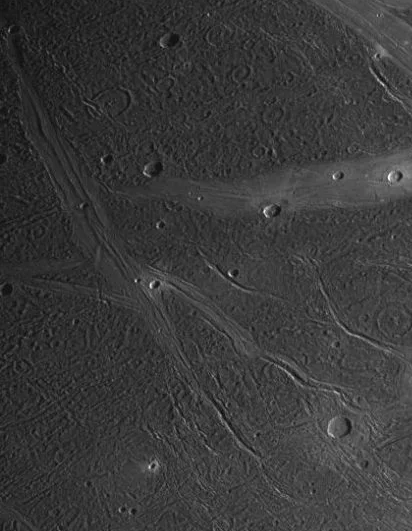
- A mosaic image of Byblus Sulcus, taken by the Galileo space probe on May 7, 1997. The other wider sulcus extending from the right is Akitu Sulcus.
- Feature type: Sulcus
- Coordinates: 37.60°N 199.70°W
- Length: 645 kilometres (401 mi)
- Eponym: Βύβλος Byblos

Byblus Sulcus is a relatively narrow, grooved terrain on Jupiter's moon Ganymede. It is a trough that runs for approximately 645 kilometres (401 mi) across the moon's surface. Its surface is thought to be younger than the darker materials found in other regions elsewhere on the moon.

== Naming ==
The International Astronomical Union (IAU) named Byblus Sulcus after the ancient Phoenician seaport city of Byblos—once a major trading hub for the seafaring Phoenicians. This is in line with the theme that features and craters on Ganymede be named after deities, heroes, or places from Ancient Middle Eastern mythologies, including Phoenician mythology.

Byblos is associated with several mythologies, including Phoenician, Egyptian and Greek mythologies. According to Philo of Byblos, to the Phoenicians, it was where the goddess Astarte placed upon her head the head of a bull as an emblem of rulership, and where she ruled over the Phoenician lands. To some Ancient Egyptians, it was the city where Osiris's body drifted after he was trapped in a coffin by his envious brother Set. To the Greeks, it was a worship center of Adonis.

The IAU approved the name for Byblus Sulcus in 1997.

== Geography ==
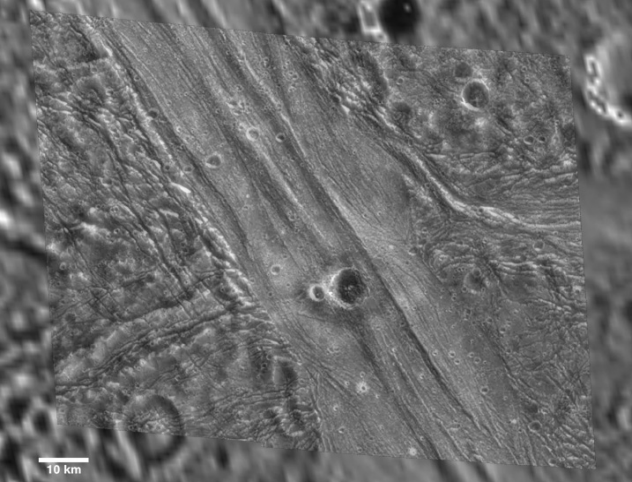
An image of the middle portion of Byblus Sulcus, taken by the Galileo space probe in September 1996. The crater at the center is Nergal

Byblus Sulcus is a narrow band of bright, grooved terrain located entirely within a dark, ancient region on Ganymede called Marius Regio. It is noticeably brighter and younger than the dark regio that surrounds it.

Starting from Philus Sulcus to the northeast, Byblus Sulcus dissects the northernmost lobe of Marius Regio, running from the northwest towards the southeast. One third of the way across the Marius lobe, Byblus Sulcus splits into two like a fork. Officially, the IAU and USGS consider these two halves as the same sulcus. A bright ray crater marks the spot where the split starts, although it is unnamed. The two branches then abruptly terminate after running one half of the way across the regio's lobe. The northeastern branch terminates near the crater Anhur.

In the middle of the sulcus is the crater Nergal. It is considered to be the youngest feature within Byblus Sulcus, and it has a satellite crater right beside it, suggesting that it is a double impact crater created when an asteroid or comet that fragmented into two crashed into the same area at the same time. By law of superposition, after Byblus Sulcus was created on top of the older Marius Regio, Nergal was, in turn, created on top of the younger sulcus.

To the east, another sulcus, Akitu Sulcus, connects to the middle section of Byblus Sulcus, while two other unnamed sulci connect to the west.

Byblus Sulcus is located in the Philus quadrangle (designated Jg4) of Ganymede's surface.

== Characteristic ==
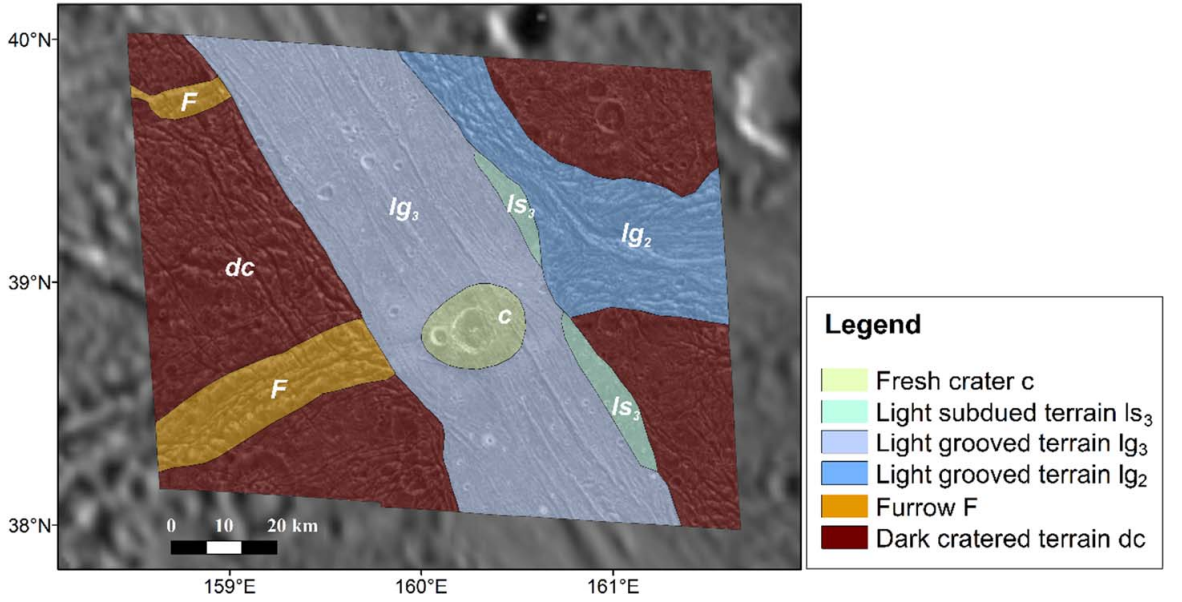
A color-coded topographic map of the middle part of Byblus Sulcus where Nergal crater (area C) is located and where the Akitu Sulcus (area Ig₂) adjoins with Byblus. The older terrain of Marius Regio is marked with a dark red color.

Like many of Ganymede’s bright regions, Byblus Sulcus is a classic example of bright and young Ganymedean terrain marked by multiple sets of ridges and grooves. Where these younger, grooved terrains meet the darker and older areas, their intersections can often reveal age relationships between the highly contrasting light and dark terrains. Younger, sinuous grooves clearly cut across and overwrite older terrains. This continual erasure and overprinting of ancient surfaces by newer tectonic activities is common across Ganymede and plays a major role in shaping its appearance.

A close examination of Byblus Sulcus reveals that its western edge cuts sharply through the Marius Regio's older terrain; while on the eastern side, the sulcus gradually blends into it instead. This same study concluded that by using the crater count method, the parts within Byblus's lg₃ area (see topographic map) is younger than most other areas around it.

The sulcus is densely packed with grooves and troughs that run parallel and semi-parallel to each other, rising up to 1 kilometre (0.62 mi) high in some places. The width of each trough can range from 1 kilometre (0.62 mi) to 3 kilometres (1.9 mi), becoming wider and thinner along different parts of the sulcus, while some of them expanding to 5 kilometres (3.1 mi) wide, forming plateaus. The furrows on the dark regio on the western side of Byblus Sulcus don't seem to correspond to any features on the eastern side.

The bright terrains on Ganymede are analogous to the dark Lunar maria on the Earth's Moon in terms of age as both are considered the youngest parts of their respective moons' surfaces. The Lunar lava flows' dark basalt composition that created the younger, dark parts of the Moon's surface is substituted with bright water ice on Ganymede. Dark terrains on Ganymede, in turn, are analogous to the bright Lunar highlands which are older than the surface of Lunar maria.

== Exploration ==
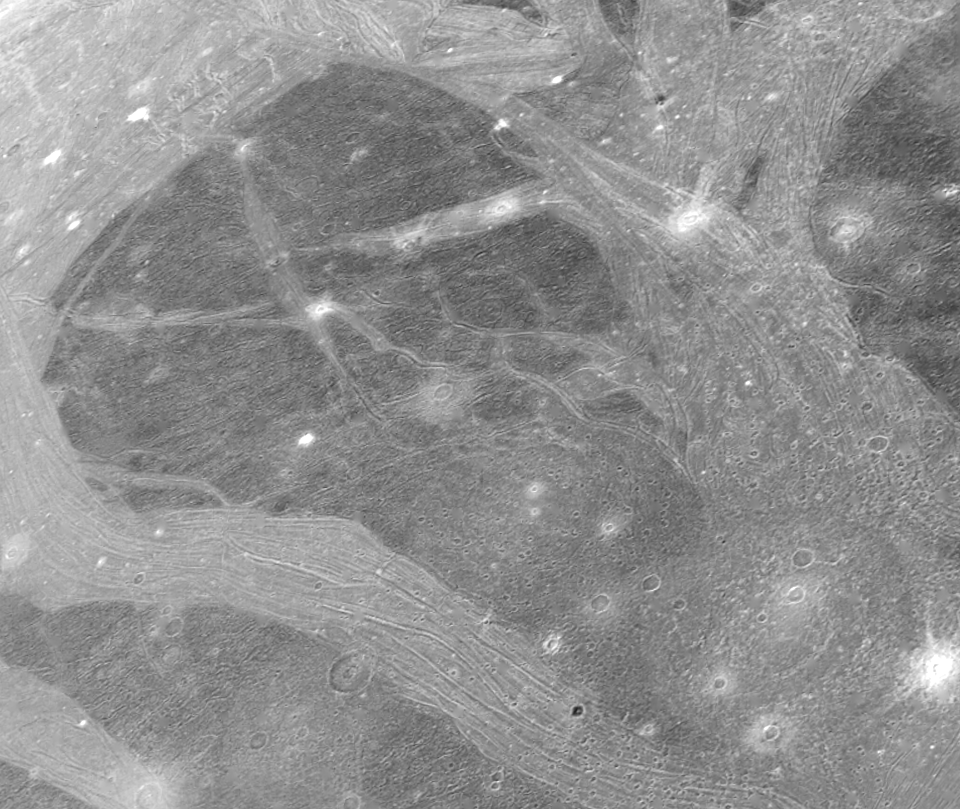
A mosaic image of a section of Marius Regio's northernmost lobe, taken by Voyager 2 in July 1979. Byblus Sulcus is the bright, grooved terrain in the middle of two other sulci. It can be seen splitting into two towards the bottom.

As of 2025, two spacecraft were able to image Byblus Sulcus: Voyager 2 and Galileo.

Voyager 2 only did a quick flyby of Jupiter and Ganymede in July 1979, but it managed to send back the first clear images of Byblus Sulcus. The sulcus is only a relatively small feature on Ganymede’s surface, which is why images with great resolution were not obtained until the Galileo spacecraft orbited Jupiter.

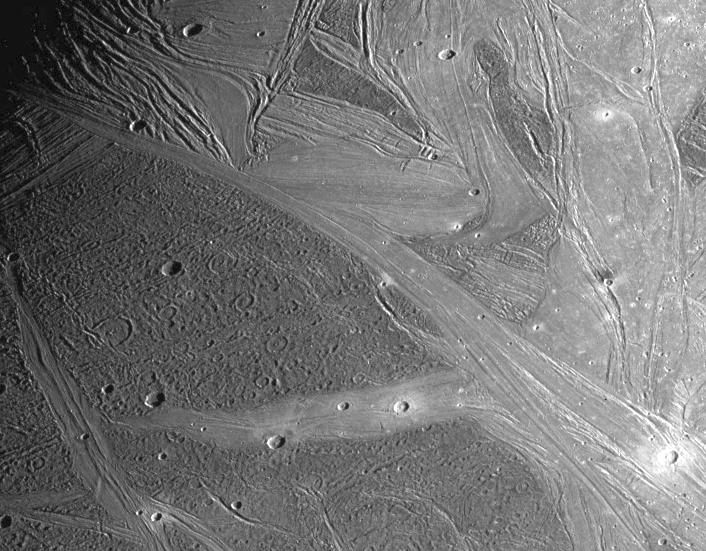
A mosaic of the northern part of Marius Regio showing Byblus Sulcus (lower left) and its neighboring areas, taken by the Galileo space probe in May 1997.

Galileo provided the first close-up images of Byblus Sulcus and Nergal Crater, which it was able to do because, unlike Voyager 2, it orbited Jupiter from December 1995 to September 2003, and was able to pass close to the moon on several occasions.

=== Future missions ===
The European Space Agency's (ESA) space probe named Jupiter Icy Moons Explorer (Juice), which was launched in April 2023, is scheduled to arrive at Jupiter in July 2031. After spending around three and a half years in orbit around Jupiter and performing multiple flybys of Europa, Callisto and Ganymede, Juice will settle into a low polar orbit around Ganymede at a distance of just 500 kilometres (310 mi). Juice is expected to send the highest-resolution images of Byblus Sulcus yet—surpassing even the quality of Galileo's images.

== See also ==
Sulcus (geology)
