= Buto Facula =

Degraded crater on Ganymede

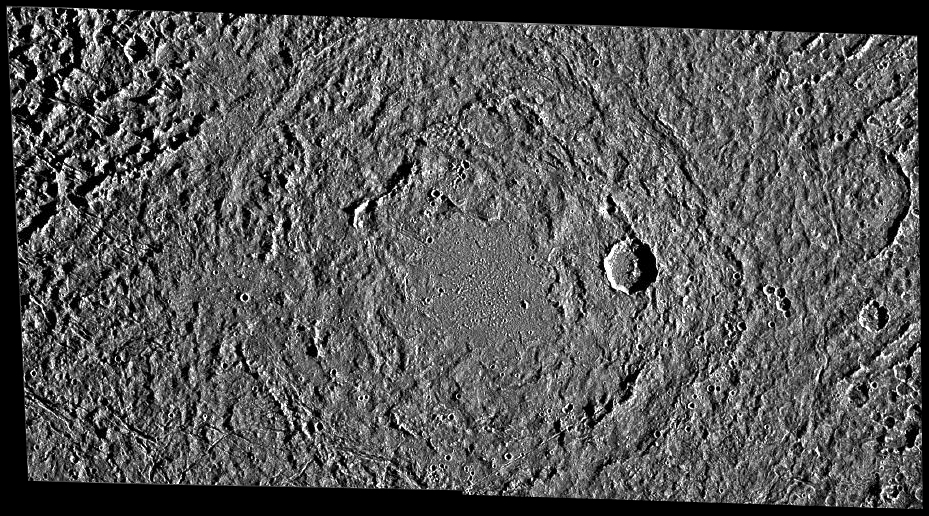
- A mosaic image of Buto Facula, taken by the Galileo space probe on October 7, 1999.
- Feature type: Facula
- Coordinates: 13.30°N 203.20°W
- Diameter: 245 km (152 mi)
- Eponym: Buto, Egypt

Buto Facula is a palimpsest, or "ghost crater", on Ganymede, the largest moon of the planet Jupiter.

== Naming ==
Buto is named after an ancient shrine city in Lower Ancient Egypt. According to Egyptian mythology, this city marks the sacred spot where the goddess Isis hid the body of her husband Osiris in the Nile swamps after he was murdered by his brother Set. Buto is also believed to be the home of Wadjet, the ubiquitous cobra goddess that is often depicted atop the crowns of pharaohs, and who represents Lower Egypt.

The International Astronomical Union's (IAU) naming convention states that faculae on Ganymede should be after places from Egyptian mythology. More specifically, all named faculae on Ganymede are named after important sacred places of worship in Ancient Egypt. In this case, Buto was the center of worship of Wadjet, and it also once held the shrines that honored the place where Isis hid Osiris and their son Horus. The name was approved by the IAU in 1985.

== Geography and Characteristics ==
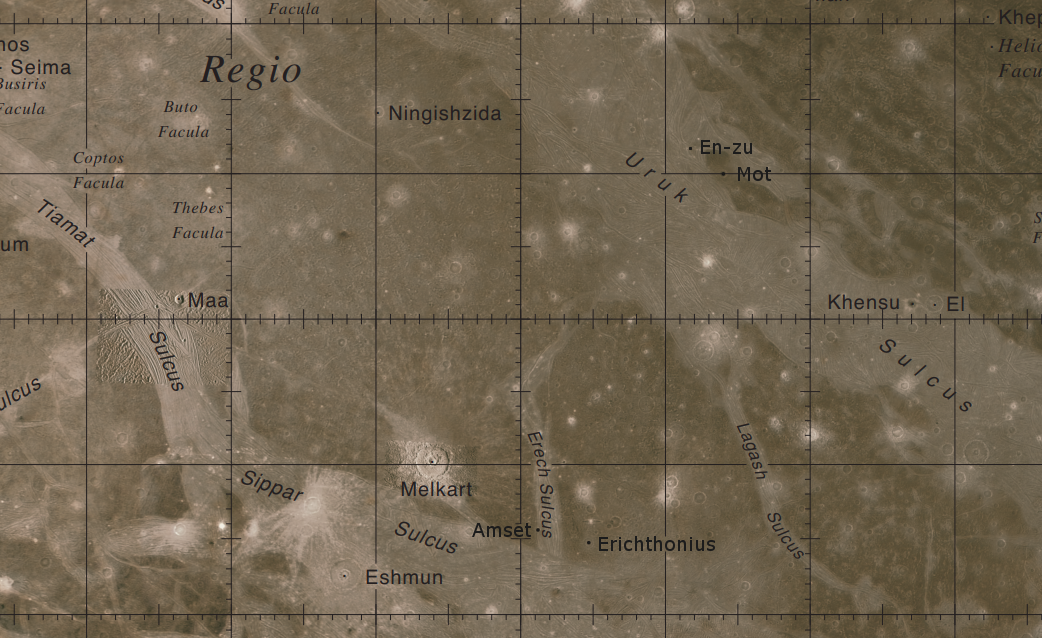
A map of the Uruk Sulcus quadrangle on Ganymede. Buto Facula is on the upper left of the map.

Buto Facula is only about 245 km (152 mi) wide and is located on the northwestern side of a massive, dark region on Ganymede called Marius Regio. It is surrounded by other faculae such as Busiris Facula (another officially recognized palimpsest), Akhmin Facula, Coptos Facula, Hermopolis Facula and Thebes Facula, and by many sulci.

Buto Facula exhibits several morphological zones as one goes outward from its center. The central region of the palimpsest is roughly 40 km (25 mi) to 50 km (31 mi) across, and it consists of a relatively smooth area containing only a few isolated small hills. Its outline is generally elliptical, though some sections take on a petal-like shape. In several places along the outer edge of this inner zone, inward-facing scarps are present.

Surrounding this is a second zone distinguished by its much rougher terrain and by two to three nearly circular ridges. These ridges do not form complete rings but instead appear as concentric arcs spaced about 40 km (25 mi) apart.

The outermost zone is smoother than the ridge-arc zone and preserves traces of older topography similar to the dark and rugged furrows found within its host Marius Regio. To the northeastern part of the facula overlies approximately a half of an older crater.

The external boundary of Buto Facula, which spans about 290 km (180 mi), is defined by a distinct brightness contrast in images taken under higher sun angles. Images of the facula revealed chains of what are likely secondary craters just outside this boundary. Together, these observations strongly support the interpretation of Buto Facula as an impact structure.

A smaller, more recent 19 km (12 mi) crater occupies the eastern side of Buto Facula.

== Exploration ==
A zoomed-in, mosaic image of a section of Marius Regio, centered on Buto Facula, taken by Voyager 2 in July 1979. The facula is so faint and degraded that it is barely discernable in the image. The bright groove at the top is Anshar Sulcus

As of 2025, Buto Facula is one of the most well-photographed faculae on Ganymede, thanks to the Galileo space probe.

Voyager 2 was able to photograph Buto Facula in reasonable details during its brief flyby of Jupiter in July 1979. However, the facula was difficult to see from its images because of how degraded Buto is, as Voyager's resolution was not high enough to help discern the facula's details.

Galileo provided excellent-resolution images of Buto Facula during its orbit around Jupiter from December 1995 to September 2003. It was able to resolve details as small as 360 meters, allowing planetary scientists to understand the terrain of the facula in detail, and to come up with hypothesis on how Buto formed and how old it is.

The European Space Agency's (ESA) spacecraft called Jupiter Icy Moons Explorer (Juice) is on its way to Jupiter and it is expected to arrive at Jupiter in July 2031. In 2034, Juice will settle into a low orbit around Ganymede at a distance of just 500 kilometres (310 mi). It is expected that Juice will be able to see more details on Buto Facula which will allow scientists to determine a more definitive history and age of the ghost crater.

== See also ==
List of geological features on Ganymede
