= Epigeus (crater) =

Impact crater on Ganymede, a moon of Jupiter

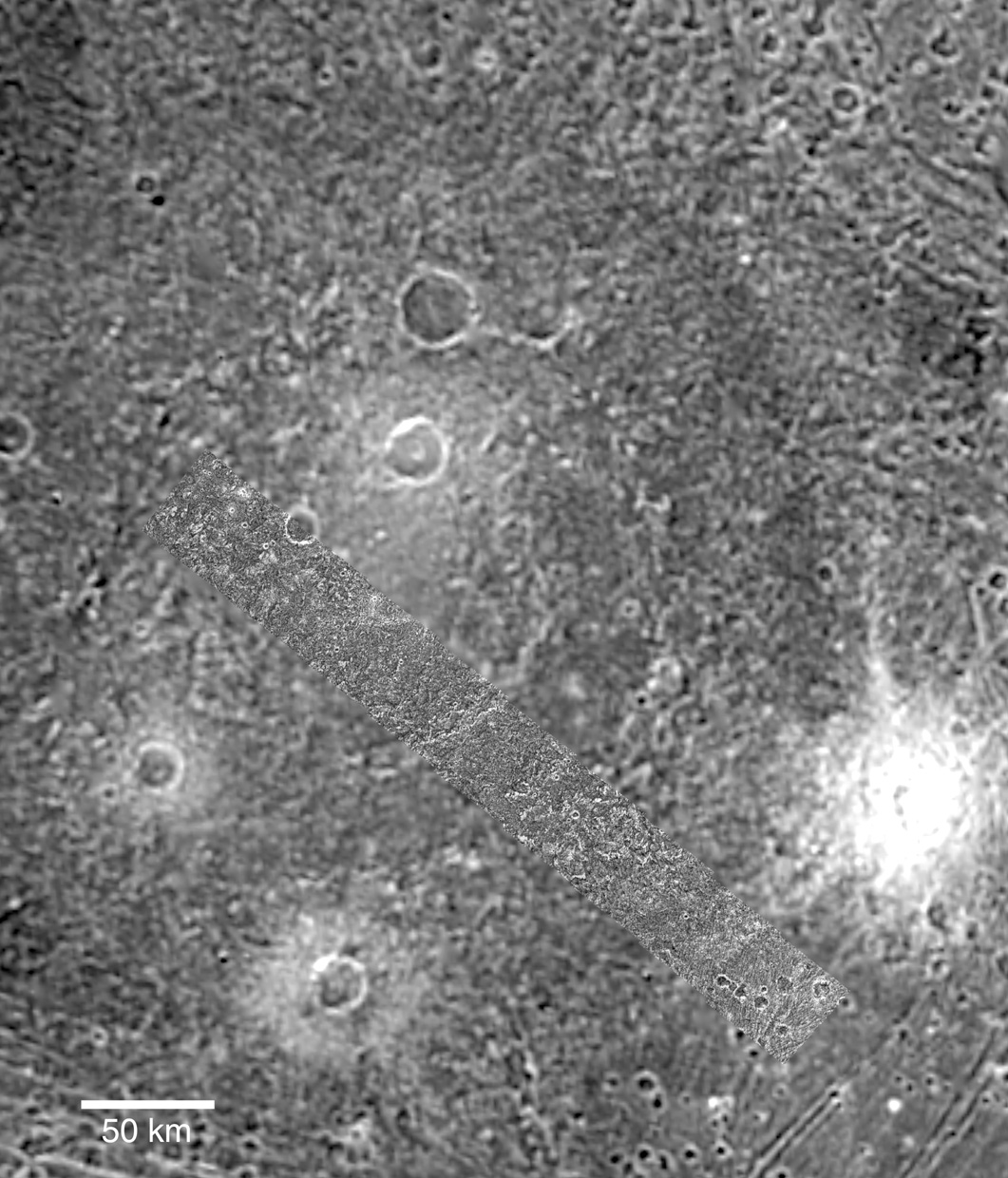
- The crater Epigeus. The crater's faint outline covers most of this image
- Feature type: Impact crater
- Coordinates: 22.96°N 179.35°E
- Diameter: 343.0 kilometres (213.1 mi)
- Eponym: Ἐπειγεύς Epigefs

Epigeus is one of the largest known impact crater on Jupiter's Galilean satellite Ganymede, with a diameter of 343 km. It is about 6.5% of the mean equatorial diameter of Ganymede, which is about 5,270 km (3,270 mi).

== Naming ==
Epigeus is named after Epigeus, a warrior Myrmidon in the Trojan War from Greek mythology. The International Astronomical Union (IAU), the governing body globally recognized as the authority for naming celestial objects and their surface features, ruled that craters and features on Ganymede be named either after deities, heroes and places from Ancient Near Eastern mythologies, or after characters and stories related to Ganymede and his home kingdom of Troy. Epigeus belongs to the latter category because he fought during the Trojan war.

Officially, according to the description of the USGS gazetteer, Epigeus is named after a Phoenician god, but there is no such god in Phoenician mythology. This name was approved by the International Astronomical Union in 1997.

== Geology ==
At the center of Epigeus, there is a 25-km-radius region of sub-radial dark-floored troughs or fractures. These troughs range from approximately 150 to 250 m across, are generally linear, and merge in dendritic or anastomosing patterns. The troughs exhibit two orthogonal preferred orientations, trending north–south and east–west. A bright, rough-textured, lobate deposit occupies the central 15 to 20 km of this region and locally surrounds troughs up to 25 km from the palimpsest center. This bright region consists of massifs 200 to 300 m across separated by 200 to 300 m. The outer ring is a complex zone corresponding to a crater diameter. The zone between those two rings is relatively smooth and it is covered in small knobs. Several lobes of this unit appear to have flowed into Valleys within this outer ring zone. The smooth units in the center and between the inner and outer rings may be a solidified impact-melt sheet. Epigeus' basin is rich with ice deposits.

== See also ==
- List of craters on Ganymede
- Meteor
