= Sulcus (geology) =

Subparallel furrows and ridges on the surface of a planet or moon

Medusae Sulci based on day THEMIS day-time image on Mars

Sulcus /ˈsʌlkəs/ (pl.: sulci /ˈsʌlsaɪ/) is, in astrogeology, an area of complex parallel or subparallel ridges and furrows on a planet or moon.

For example, Uruk Sulcus is a bright region of grooved terrain adjacent to Galileo Regio on Jupiter's moon Ganymede.
