= Saltu (crater) =

Crater on Ganymede

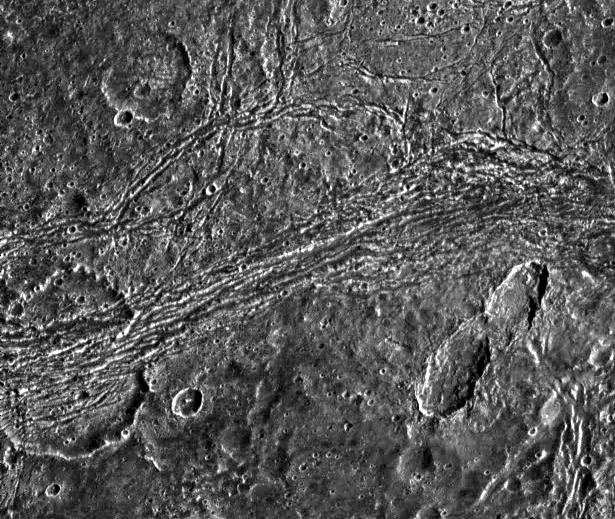
- A mosaic image of Saltu crater (lower left), taken by the Galileo space probe on April 5, 1997. The crater appears to have been disrupted by ridges, and stretched apart in the north–south direction.
- Feature type: Strained Crater
- Coordinates: 14.15°S 352.77°W
- Diameter: 40 kilometres (25 mi)
- Eponym: Saltu

Saltu is a highly deformed crater on the surface of Ganymede, the largest moon of Jupiter. It is a relatively small crater, with a diameter of approximately 40 kilometres (25 mi), and much of it has been disrupted and torn apart by a massive rift produced by tectonic activity.

== Naming ==
Saltu is named after the Babylonian goddess Saltu (or Saltum). According to the ancient Babylonian worship text known as the Agushaya Hymn, Saltu was the goddess of strife and discord who was created from the dirt under the fingernails of the god Ea. She was brought into existence for the sole purpose of challenging and humiliating the goddess Ishtar, whose behavior has provoked and enraged Ea.

The name follows the convention established by the International Astronomical Union (IAU), which stipulates that craters on Ganymede should be named after deities, heroes, or places from Ancient Middle Eastern mythology, including Babylonian mythology.

The IAU approved the name for Saltu in 2006.

== Location ==
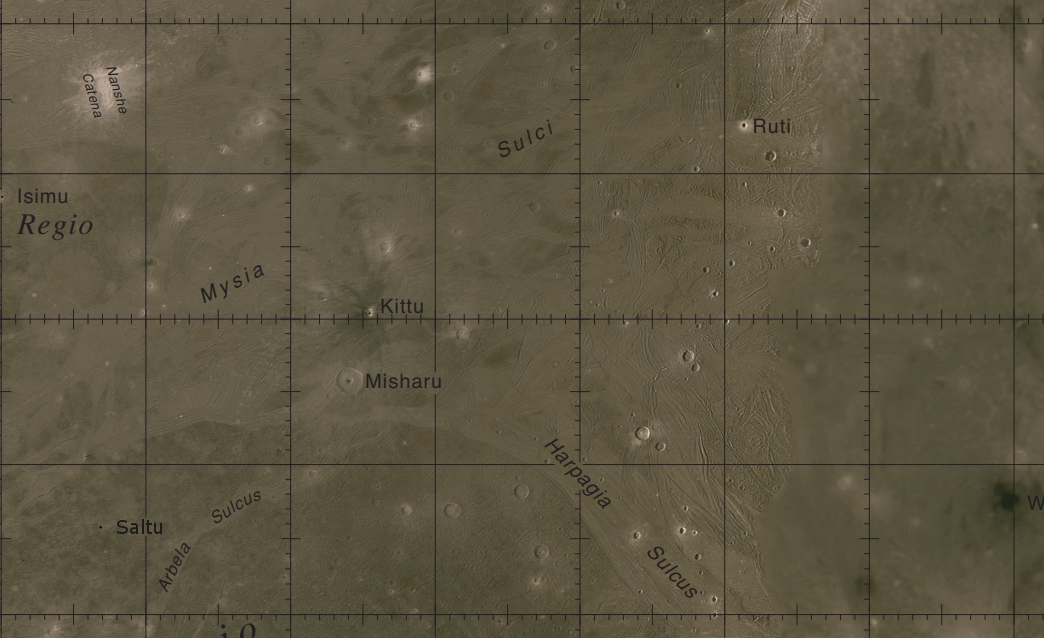
A map showing the location of Saltu crater within Misharu quadrangle.

Saltu is located within a dark, ancient, and rugged region on Ganymede known as Nicholson Regio, on the regio's northeastern lobe. The crater is situated south of Mysia Sulci and west of a bright, sinuous grooved terrain called Arbela Sulcus. The rift that heavily damaged Saltu originates from a branch of Arbela Sulcus.

Saltu sits at the southwestern corner of the Misharu quadrangle (i.e. section) of Ganymede (designated Jg10). The strained crater is located on the hemisphere of Ganymede that permanently faces Jupiter, a consequence of the moon's synchronous rotation during its orbit around its parent planet. As a result, an observer at Saltu crater would always see Jupiter fixed in the sky overhead. (Note: For moons in synchronous rotation, such as Ganymede, 0° longitude corresponds to the part of the surface that always faces Jupiter. Regions between 90° W to 0° to 270° W longitude always face the moon’s parent planet.)

== Morphology ==
High-resolution imagery of Ganymede has revealed the existence of various craters dissected by subparallel ridges and troughs that trend roughly orthogonal to the craters' long axes, suggesting deformation by extensional stresses. Saltu is an prominent example of such kinds of craters that were destroyed by rifting and extensional stretching. The rift zones that deform these craters display extensional strains ranging from approximately 5% to nearly 180% within a well-defined fault zone that transects Saltu crater. Extensional fault zones characterized by domino-style normal faulting, and accommodating strains of several tens of percent, may be widespread on Ganymede. Deformation of this magnitude is sufficient to modify pre-existing surface features beyond recognition through tectonic resurfacing.

Other prominent examples of craters that have experienced extensive rifting and extensional strain include Erichthonius and Nefertum.

== Exploration ==
Voyager 1 was the first spacecraft to image Saltu crater during its brief flyby of Ganymede in March 1979. Because Voyager 1 did not pass close to Ganymede, and because Saltu is relatively small, only medium-resolution images of the crater were obtained.

As of 2026, the Galileo probe remains the only spacecraft to have obtained high-resolution close-up images of Saltu crater during its orbital mission around Jupiter from December 1995 to September 2003. The image was acquired during a targeted flyby in April 1997, during which Galileo also investigated Nicholson Regio and the nearby extensive rift system of the Arbela Sulcus.

In December 2000, the Cassini space probe flew by Ganymede at a distance of 10,000,000 kilometres (6,200,000 mi). The probe was able to image the hemisphere of Jupiter that contains Saltu, but, like Voyager 1, the crater was too small and Cassini was too far to discern any meaningful details.

In a similar manner, the Juno spacecraft photographed Saltu during its flyby of Ganymede in June 2021. However, the crater remained difficult to discern, as it was both small and located near the limb of the moon during the flyby.

=== Future Missions ===
The European Space Agency's (ESA) Jupiter Icy Moons Explorer (Juice), launched in April 2023, is scheduled to arrive at Jupiter in July 2031. In 2034, Juice is expected to settle into a low orbit around Ganymede at a distance of just 500 kilometres (310 mi) in July 2034. The high-resolution images of Saltu crater that the probe is expected to send in the future will help planetary scientists better understand Ganymede's tectonic activity and how such processes modify or disrupt older surface features on the moon.

== See also ==
- List of craters on Ganymede
- Meteor
