= Dardanus Sulcus =

Bright region on Ganymede

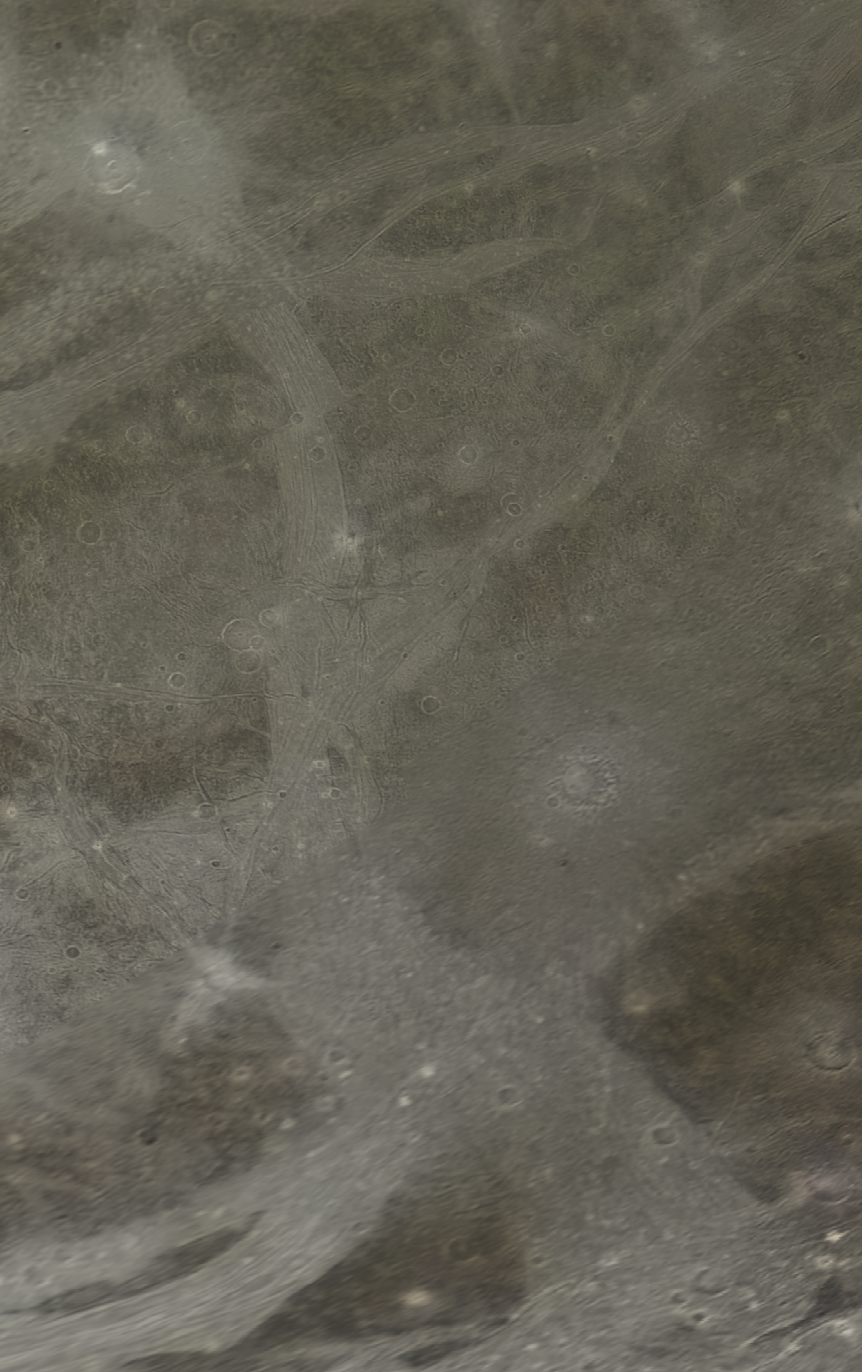
- A Mercator projection map of Dardanus Sulcus (the bright terrain running from top left to bottom right). The prominent crater slightly to the lower right of the center of the image is Damkina.
- Feature type: Sulcus
- Coordinates: 31.50°S 12.70°W
- Length: 1,500 kilometres (930 mi)
- Width: 150 kilometres (93 mi)
- Eponym: Δάρδανος Dardanos

Dardanus Sulcus is a prominent grooved terrain on Jupiter's moon Ganymede. It is a deformed trough that runs for approximately 1,500 kilometres (930 mi) across the moon's surface from north to south. Its surface is thought to be younger than the darker materials found in the regions that surround it.

== Naming ==
Dardanus Sulcus is named after an ancient, ruined city in modern-day Turkey called Dardanus. In Greek mythology, this city was near the place where the handsome Trojan prince Ganymede was abducted by Zeus (the Greek equivalent of the Roman god Jupiter) in the form of an eagle. Ganymede was subsequently taken to Mount Olympus to serve as the cupbearer to the gods.

The International Astronomical Union (IAU) chose this name in line with the naming convention that surface features and craters on Ganymede be named either after deities, heroes and places from Ancient Near Eastern mythologies, or figures and places related to prince Ganymede or his home kingdom of Troy. Dardanus Sulcus falls into the latter category, as its namesake was a city near Troy situated close to the site where Ganymede was abducted by Zeus. The name was approved by the IAU in 1979.

On planet Earth, the Dardanelles Strait is also named after the same ancient city.

== Location ==
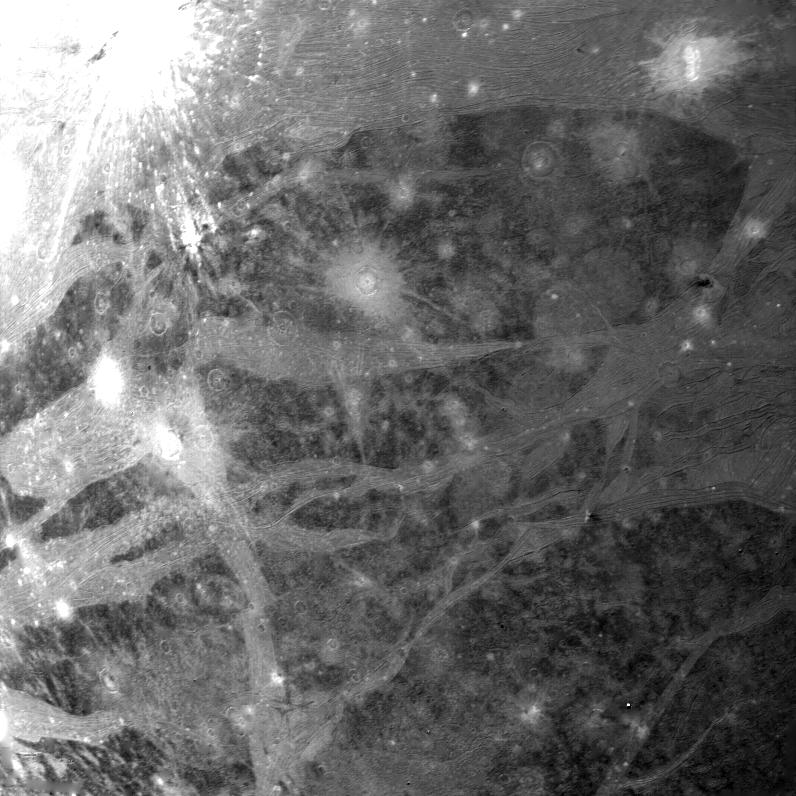
An image of Dardanus Sulcus (the bright terrain slightly to the left from the center, running from top to bottom), taken by Voyager 1 in March 1979.

Dardanus Sulcus runs across two dark, ancient regions of Ganymede called Barnard Regio and Nicholson Regio. The sulcus cuts each of the dark regions roughly in half, between their western lobes and eastern lobes.

Dardanus Sulcus begins at the northern part of Barnard Regio near a craters called Danel. Dardanus then runs from north to south. As Dardanus Sulcus bisects Barnard Regio, it encounters and cuts across another bright, grooved terrain called Mysia Sulci. After passing through Mysia Sulci, Dardanus moves into Nicholson Regio where it also dissects the dark terrain, similar to what it does in Barnard Regio.

Around five-sixths of the way along its course, it encounters another bright terrain sulcus called Arbela Sulcus, near a crater called Damkina. Dardanus Sulcus terminates at the southernmost part of Nicholson Regio near a crater called Nabu.

"The sixth quadrangle (or section) of Ganymede is named after Dardanus Sulcus, and this quadrangle is designated Jg6. However, owing to its great length and the position of its northern terminus, more than half of Dardanus Sulcus actually crosses into the Nabu quadrangle (designated Jg11) to the south."

Dardanus Sulcus is located in the sub-Jovian hemisphere of Ganymede—the side of Ganymede that always points toward Jupiter. This is a consequence of the moon's synchronous rotation around its parent planet. Therefore, an observer on Dardanus Sulcus will always see Jupiter in the same position in the sky.

== Characteristics ==
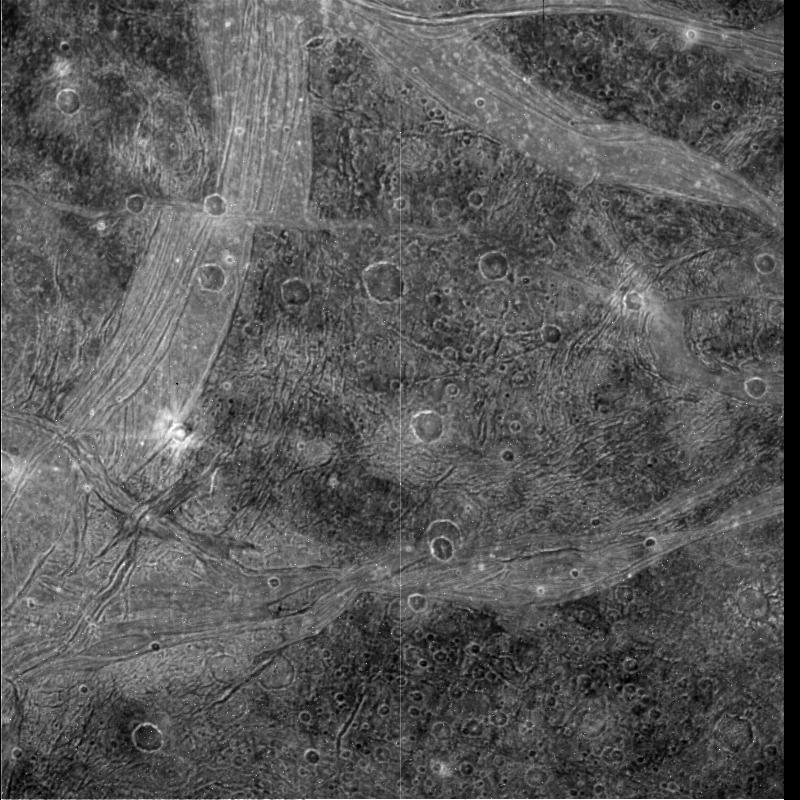
The middle section of Dardanus Sulcus, taken by the Galileo space probe in December 2000, showing a misalignment of the sulcus due to slip-strike faulting.

Like many bright regions on Ganymede, Dardanus Sulcus is an example of a bright terrain region which characteristically exhibits multiple sets of ridges and grooves.

Scientific consensus states that bright terrains on Ganymede are younger than the darker, more rugged terrains of the moon. These terrains are created when fresh water ice from underneath Ganymede's surface wells up, erasing, smoothing out, and overprinting the dark regions of the moon. In addition, fresh ice reflects a lot of sunlight, making young terrains like Dardanus Sulcus significantly brighter than the dark regions, such as Nicholson Regio, that surround them. This ongoing modification and resurfacing of ancient terrain through tectonic activity is commonplace on Ganymede and plays a huge role in determining the moon's appearance and shaping its surface. In this case, Dardanus Sulcus overprinted the older Barnard Regio and Nicholson Regio.

On Ganymede, the brightness of surfaces indicates youth, making its bright sulci analogous to the Moon's dark maria since both of them are the youngest surfaces of their respective moon. Conversely, Ganymede's dark regions are ancient, correlating to the Moon's bright, cratered highlands. Whereas the Moon's young regions were shaped by basaltic lava, Ganymede's bright terrains were formed by upwelling water ice.

== Formation and Tectonics ==
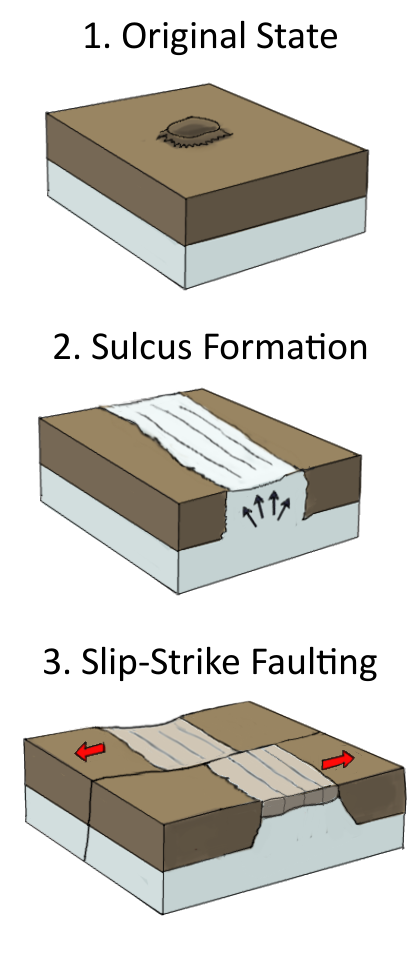
A diagram showing how Dardanus Sulcus probably formed.

A research done by Cameron, Smith-Konter, Burkhard, Collins and Pappalardo divided Dardanus Sulcus into eight distinct morphological domains to illustrate a chronological sequence of crustal deformation that happened during the formation and history of the sulcus. First is the Ancient Crust, which refers to the heavily cratered dark terrain of Nicholson Regio (Domain 1) and serves as the oldest unit. Second is the Intermediate Terrain, comprising light terrain units (Domains 2–4) that cross-cut the dark terrain and are marked by a northeast-to-southwest fault showing 45 km of right-lateral offset. Last is the subsequent light terrain (Domains 5–8) that overprints all earlier structures. A narrow swath (Domain 6) may represent the most recent period of tectonic activity.

The research suggest that Dardanus Sulcus's initial east northeast-west south west extension led to the formation of the intermediate light terrains (Domains 2–4). Stress analysis suggests a principal stress orientation of approximately 170°. Then, a counterclockwise rotation of principal stresses occurred, shifting to a northeast-southwest extensional regime. This transition resulted in the right-lateral motion observed along the northeast-southwest. This stage is best modeled by a principal stress orientation between 120° and 140°.

High-resolution images of Dardanus Sulcus from the Galileo spacecraft reveal that the sulcus most likely experienced extensive slip-strike faulting and straining. A handful of segments on Dardanus Sulcus clearly exhibit misalignment of surface features, strongly suggesting past tectonic movement. A defining characteristic of the sulcus is a northeast-southwest trending fault with a distinctive wavy planform. This unnamed fault has resulted in a right-lateral offset of approximately 45 km within the light terrain. Additionally, the region exhibits various offset structures, which are typically indicative of strike-slip shear and crustal deformation.

== Exploration ==
Voyager 1 became the first probe to image Dardanus Sulcus. Even though it only did a single, medium-distance flyby of Ganymede in July 1979, it managed to send back the first clear images of Dardanus Sulcus. It was able to image the long sulcus in its entirety. Voyager 2, on the other hand, flew by Ganymede on the opposite of where Dardanus Sulcus is located, consequently, it was unable to obtain images of the sulcus.

Galileo was able to photograph Dardanus Sulcus several times as it orbited Jupiter from December 1995 to September 2003. The probe imaged the surface feature in high resolution, allowing for a detailed view of its grooves. Its imagery was the first to reveal the misaligned portions of the sulcus. However, due to the great length of the feature, the craft was not able to take close-up photos of its entire extent. As of 2026, the images returned by the Galileo probe remain the best available data for Dardanus Sulcus.

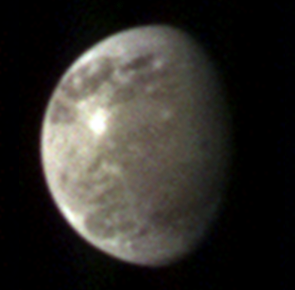
A low-resolution image of Ganymede showing Dardanus Sulcus (slightly to the lower left from the center), taken by Cassini in December 2000.

Cassini was only able to image Dardanus Sulcus from a great distance of 10,000,000 kilometres (6,200,000 mi) during its Jupiter flyby in December 2000; consequently, it could not provide detailed imagery of the sulcus. However, Dardanus Sulcus is large enough to be discernible even in these low-resolution views.

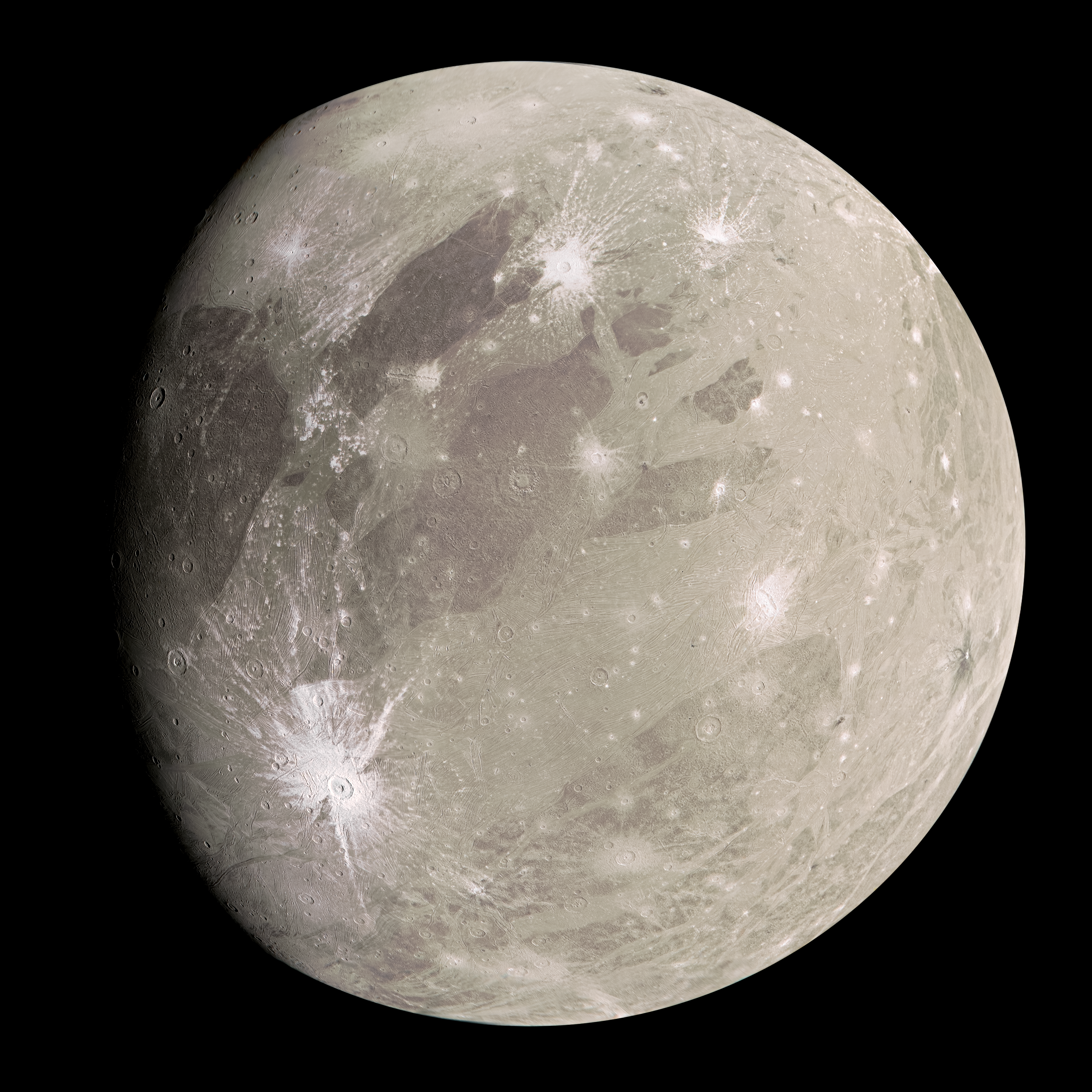
An image of Ganymede, showing Dardanus Sulcus at the very bottom of the moon, taken by Juno in June 2021.

As of 2026, the Juno space probe is the last spacecraft to image Dardanus Sulcus, which it did so during its 34th perijove (or closest approach to Jupiter) when it flew by Ganymede to shorten its orbit around Jupiter in June 2021. Dardanus Sulcus was near the southern limb of Ganymede during this flyby.

=== Future missions ===
The European Space Agency (ESA)'s Jupiter Icy Moons Explorer (Juice) is currently on its way to Jupiter to study Ganymede and Jupiter's other icy moons. Launched in April 2023, and it is scheduled to arrive at Jupiter in July 2031. After spending approximately three and a half years in orbit around Jupiter and performing multiple flybys of Europa, Ganymede, and Callisto, Juice will settle into a low polar orbit around Ganymede at a distance of as low as 500 kilometres (310 mi). Juice is expected to complete the high-resolution map of Dardanus Sulcus, which Galileo was unable to finish.

== See also ==
Sulcus (geology)
