= Arbela Sulcus =

Bright region on Ganymede

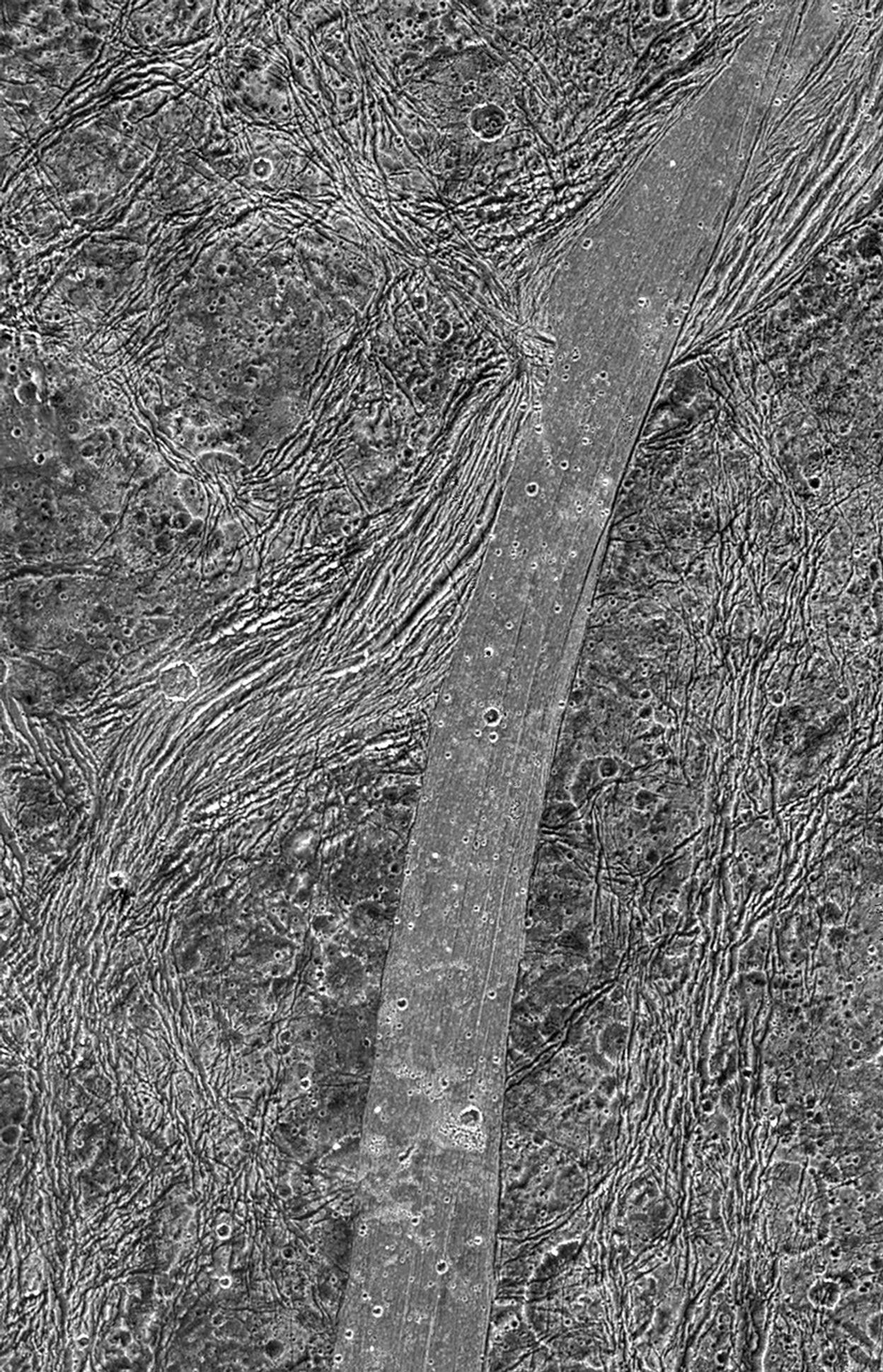
- An image of a big portion of Arbela Sulcus, taken by the Galileo space probe on May 20, 2000. Its smoother, grooved terrain can be easily seen cutting through the older, more rugged terrain of Nicholson Regio on either side of the sulcus.
- Feature type: Sulcus
- Coordinates: 34.00°S 4°W
- Length: 3,850 kilometres (2,390 mi)
- Eponym: Arbela, modern Iraq

Arbela Sulcus is a long, grooved terrain on Jupiter's largest moon Ganymede. It is a major trough that runs for approximately 3,850 kilometres (2,390 mi). Its surface is younger and smoother than the darker materials found in the region that surrounds it.

== Naming ==
Arbela Sulcus is named after a Middle Eastern city called Arbela, an ancient name for Erbil in modern-day Iraq. It was a major center of worship for the Babylonian goddess Ishtar, the goddess of love, war and the heavens, who was one of the most important deities to the Ancient Babylonians.

The International Astronomical Union (IAU) chose the name Arbela following the theme that surface features and craters on Ganymede be named after deities, heroes and places from Ancient Middle Eastern mythology, of which Babylonian mythology is one of them. The IAU approved the name for Arbela Sulcus in 1985.

== Location ==
Arbela Sulcus is entirely located within the darker, ancient region called Nicholson Regio. The brighter sulcus snakes its way into the middle of Nicholson Regio, beginning from the northeast of Nicholson near a crater called Misharu, extending towards the southwest and roughly bisecting the aforementioned dark terrain diagonally. Arbela Sulcus then encounters another sulcus called Dardanus Sulcus approximately midway along its length before crossing over and continuing its westward course.

Arbela Sulcus terminates at Nicholson Regio's south-westernmost point near a dark-ray crater called Humbaba.

The entire length of Arbela Sulcus is located within three quadrangles (or sections) of Ganymede— the Misharu, Nabu and Namtar quadrangles (designated Jg10, Jg11, and Jg14 respectively).

Arbela Sulcus is located on the side of Ganymede that is always facing Jupiter. This is due to the moon's synchronous rotation around its parent planet. As a result, an observer standing on Arbela Sulcus would always see Jupiter in the sky.

== Natural history ==
Like many of Ganymede's bright regions, Arbela Sulcus is a relatively brighter terrain characterized by multiple sets of ridges and grooves mostly running parallel to each other.

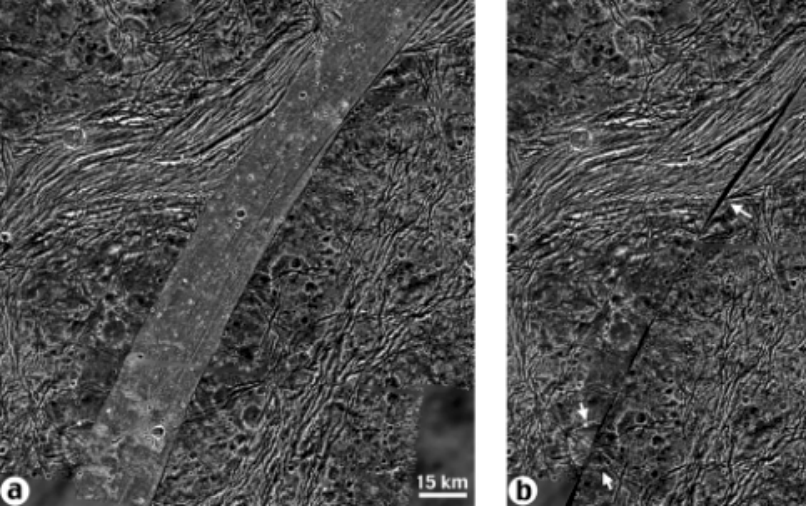
A reconstruction of Arbela Sulcus's formation. To the left, it shows Arbela Sulcus as it appears today, while to the right, it shows what the region originally looked like before it split apart, with the craters and surface features on either side of the sulcus restored to their original configurations.

According to a study by Collins, Head, Pappalardo, Nixon, Giese, Wagner and the Galileo SSI team, it is possible that Arbela Sulcus marks a zone where Ganymede's surface is progressively splitting apart the older and darker original crust of Ganymede before replacing it with a newer surface.

According to simulations and reconstruction of Ganymede's past, by matching the craters and features on either side of Arbela Sulcus, it is likely that Arbela Sulcus indeed formed through the horizontal splitting of Nicholson Regio, followed by diagonal shear that displaced these features. The displacement of features and fractures by as much as 65 kilometres (40 mi) along the zone of furrows and ridges strongly suggests that strike-slip faulting played a significant role in the formation of Arbela Sulcus. Unlike most other sulci on Ganymede, Arbela Sulcus probably formed differently because it formed through lithospheric separation of the moon's crust.

However, this reconstruction is not perfect, leaving conclusions regarding the spreading of Arbela Sulcus and other “plank-like” lanes of smooth, bright terrain still ambiguous.

High-resolution stereo imaging of Arbela Sulcus was conducted to better understand the morphology and topography of isolated “planks” on Ganymede. The observations reveal that Arbela Sulcus has a sigmoid shape composed of differently oriented segments, with a smooth, north-northeast-trending plank that crosscuts older, east-northeast-trending grooved terrain. The plank surface displays subdued ridges and troughs at 100–200 m scales and stands at a higher elevation than adjacent dark terrain. These characteristics suggest that if Arbela Sulcus originally formed through volcanic flooding, later tectonic processes must have modified its present appearance.

== Geology ==
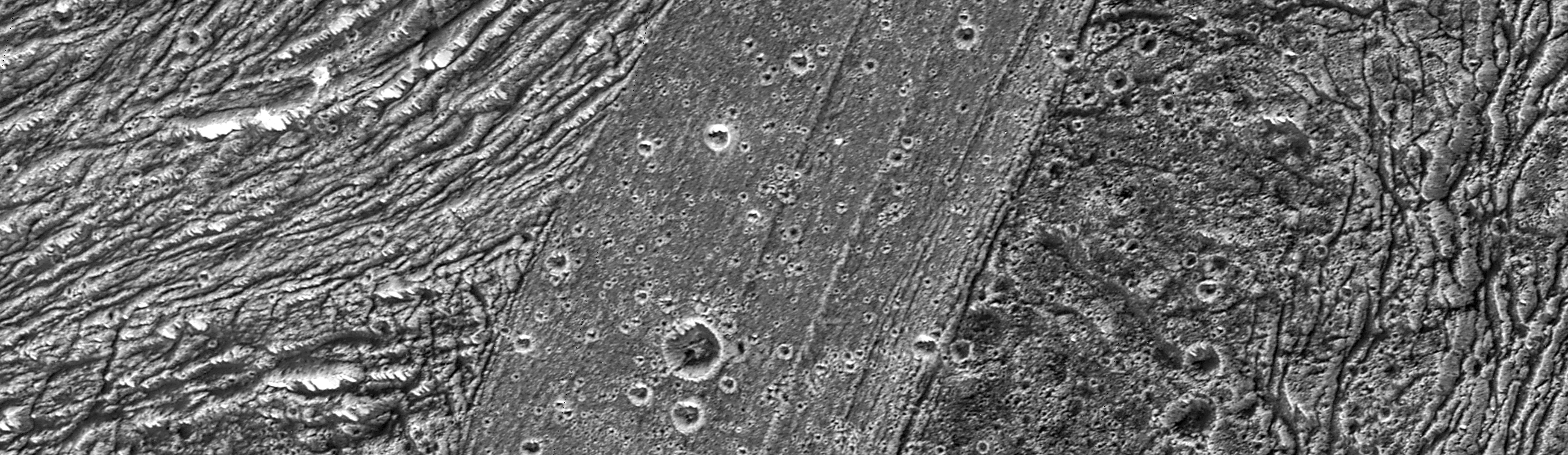
An image of a section of Arbela Sulcus within Nicholson Regio's east lobe, showing the smoother and younger Arbela Sulcus sharply cutting across the rugged and older terrain around it. This image was taken by Galileo in May 2000.

In images of Arbela Sulcus, its younger, sinuous grooves can be seen clearly cutting across older surfaces. This widespread process where tectonic activity replaces older terrain with fresher material plays a major role in shaping Ganymede's surface appearance. In the case of Arbela Sulcus, this resurfacing pushed apart the dark terrain of Nicholson Regio, splitting its older terrain into two. The intersections of grooved terrains and the darker, older, more rugged terrains can be used to reveal age relationships between the two.

In terms of relative age, Ganymede's bright terrains are analogous to the dark lunar maria on Earth's Moon, as both represent the youngest surfaces on their respective bodies. By contrast, Ganymede's dark terrains correspond to the Moon's bright highlands, which predate the maria. Unlike the Moon, however, where basaltic lava formed the maria, Ganymede's grooved terrains are composed primarily of water ice.

== Exploration ==
Arbela Sulcus was explored by a handful of space probes. The sulcus was of particular interest to astrogeologists because of the possibility that the tectonic activity that formed Arbela is an analogue of the tectonic activity on Europa, another moon of Jupiter that planetary scientists are greatly interested in studying because of its noteworthy geological processes and the possibility that it might harbor life.

Voyager 1 was the first probe to send back clear images of Arbela Sulcus during its flyby of Ganymede in March 1979. However, it was not able to image the western end of the sulcus. Voyager 2, on the other hand, flew by the opposite side of Ganymede during its flyby a few months later so it was not able to take any photographs of Arbela Sulcus.

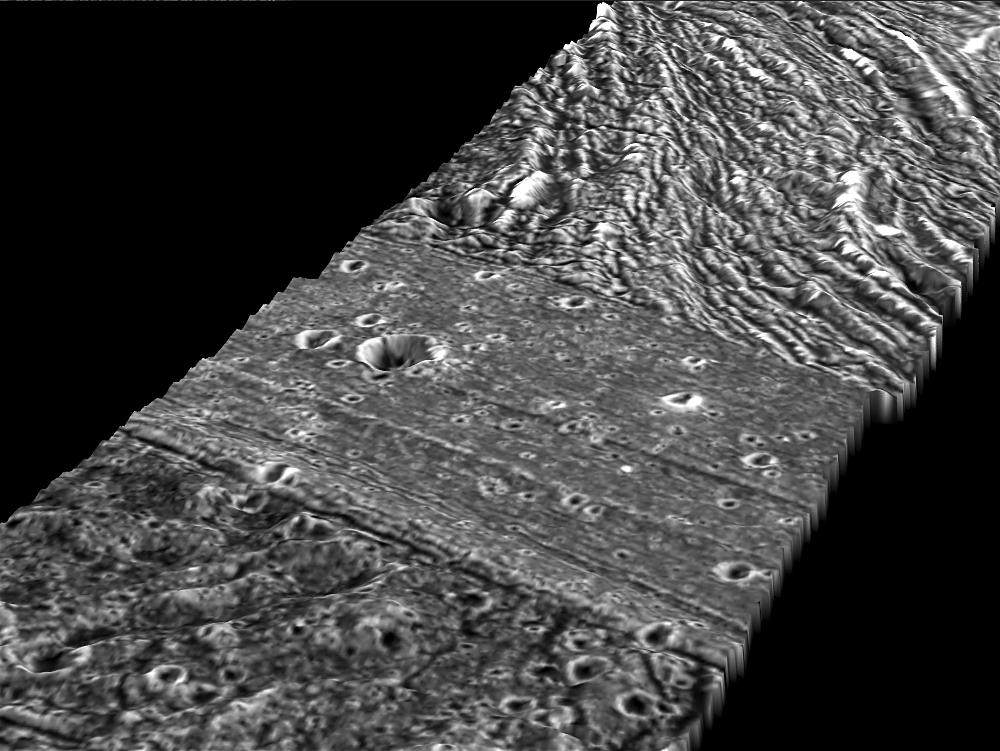
A 3D rendering of a section of Arbela Sulcus and Nicholson Regio. This render was constructed using several images taken by Galileo.

Arbela Sulcus was the subject of many stereo images taken by Galileo during its orbit about Jupiter from December 1995 to September 2003, enabling planetary scientists to construct several 3D renderings of the sulcus's terrain. The probe was able to fly as low as 3,350 kilometres (2,080 mi) from Ganymede's surface during its 28th orbit around Jupiter in May 2000, allowing its camera to see details as small as 70 meters on Arbela Sulcus. As of 2025, Galileo's images are the only close-up image of Arbela Sulcus.

A simulated flyover animation of Arbela Sulcus, assembled from Galileo images.

In December 2000, NASA released a 3D simulated flyover of Arbela Sulcus by combining all of Galileo's available Ganymede images during its 7th and 28th orbit of Jupiter.

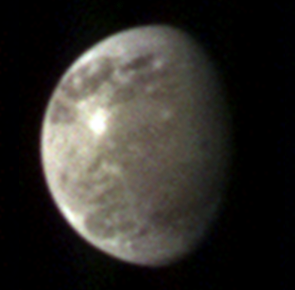
A distant image Ganymede, barely showing Arbela Sulcus surrounded by Nicholson Regio. This image was taken by Cassini in December 2000.

In December 2000, the Cassini space probe was able to image Arbela Sulcus, but only in low resolution because the probe was more than 10,000,000 kilometres (6,200,000 mi) away during its brief flyby.

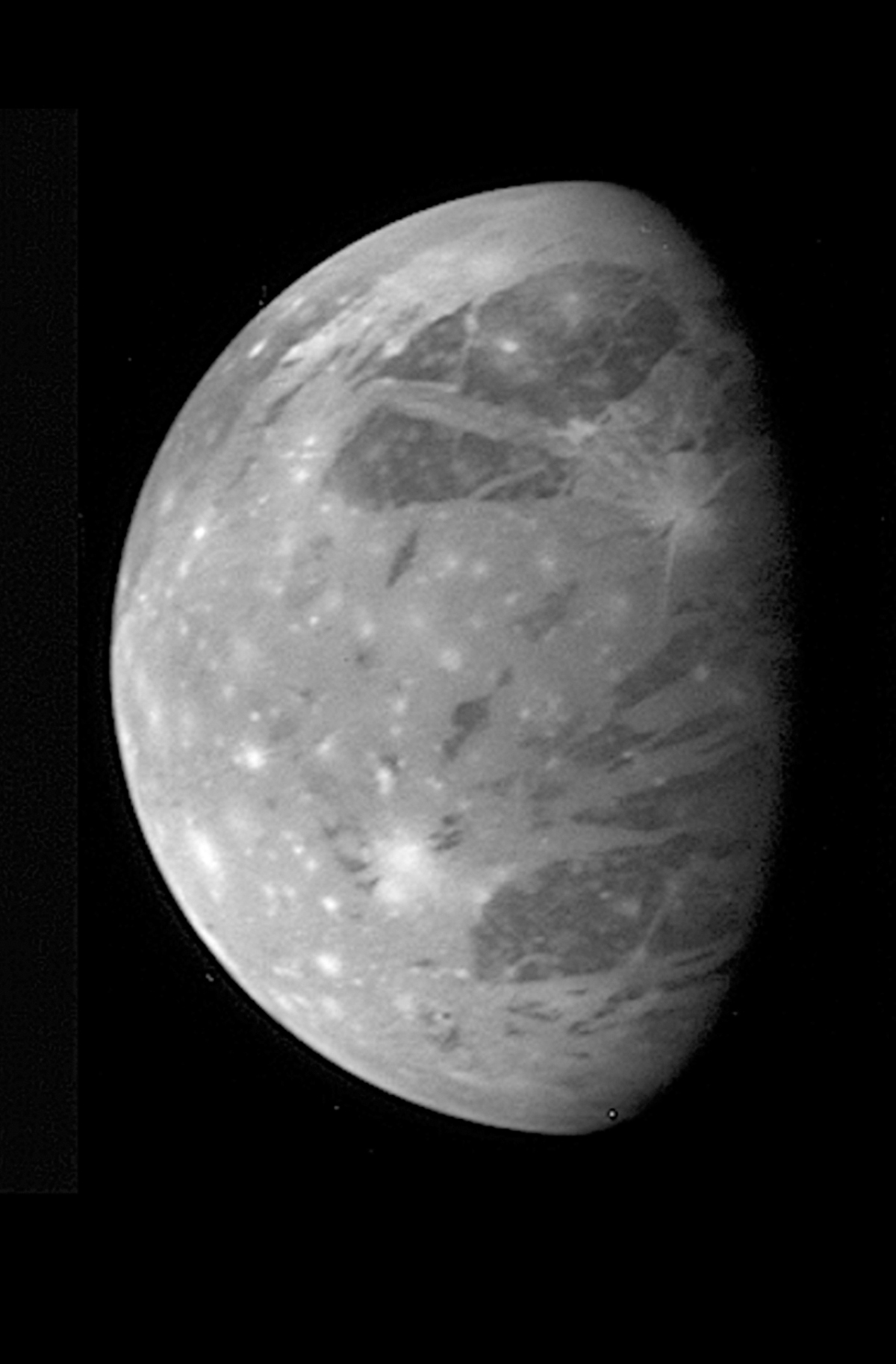
A greyscale image of Ganymede showing the western end of Arbela Sulcus and Nicholson Regio (lower center), taken by the New Horizons probe in February 2007.

The New Horizons probe was only able to image the western terminus of Arbela Sulcus because the rest of the sulcus was on the night side of Ganymede during its quick visit in February 2007.

=== Future mission ===
The European Space Agency's (ESA) Jupiter Icy Moons Explorer (Juice) orbiter is currently on its way to Jupiter, and is scheduled to arrive at the Jovian system in July 2031. After spending around three and a half years in orbit around Jupiter and performing multiple flybys of Europa, Callisto and Ganymede, Juice is expected to settle into a low polar orbit around Ganymede—orbiting as low as 500 kilometres (310 mi) from the moon's surface. This will allow it to take the most detailed images of Arbela Sulcus.

Juice's orbit is expected to decay as a result of Jupiter's gravitational tugs, and it will crash into the moon after it runs out of fuel, possibly excavating bright, fresh ice and other materials that are similar to Ganymede's other sulci in the process.

== Gallery ==
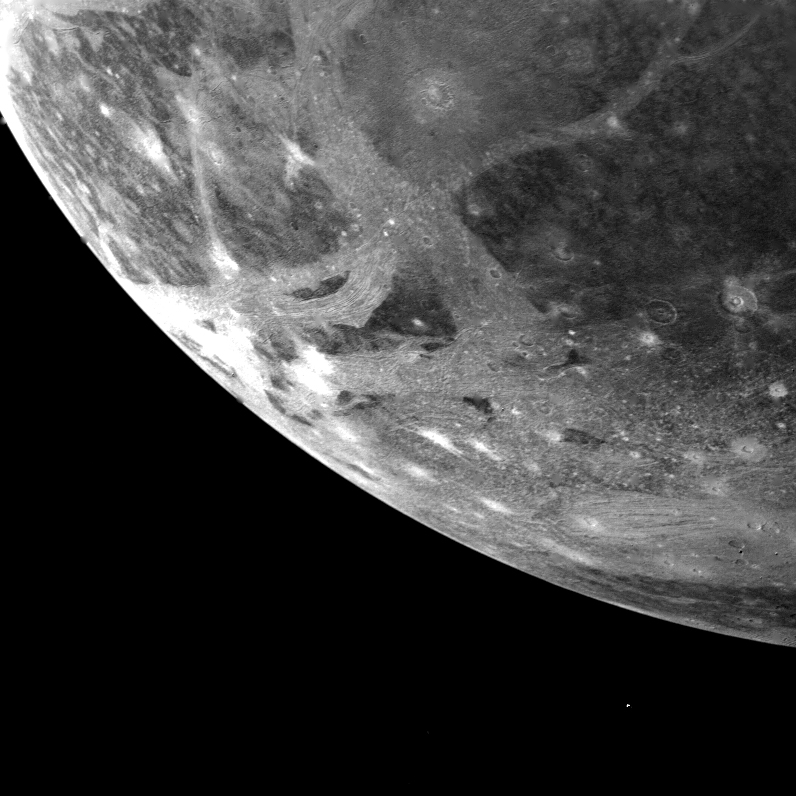
An image showing the middle point of Arbela Sulcus where it encounters Dardanus Sulcus, taken by Voyager 1 in March 1979.

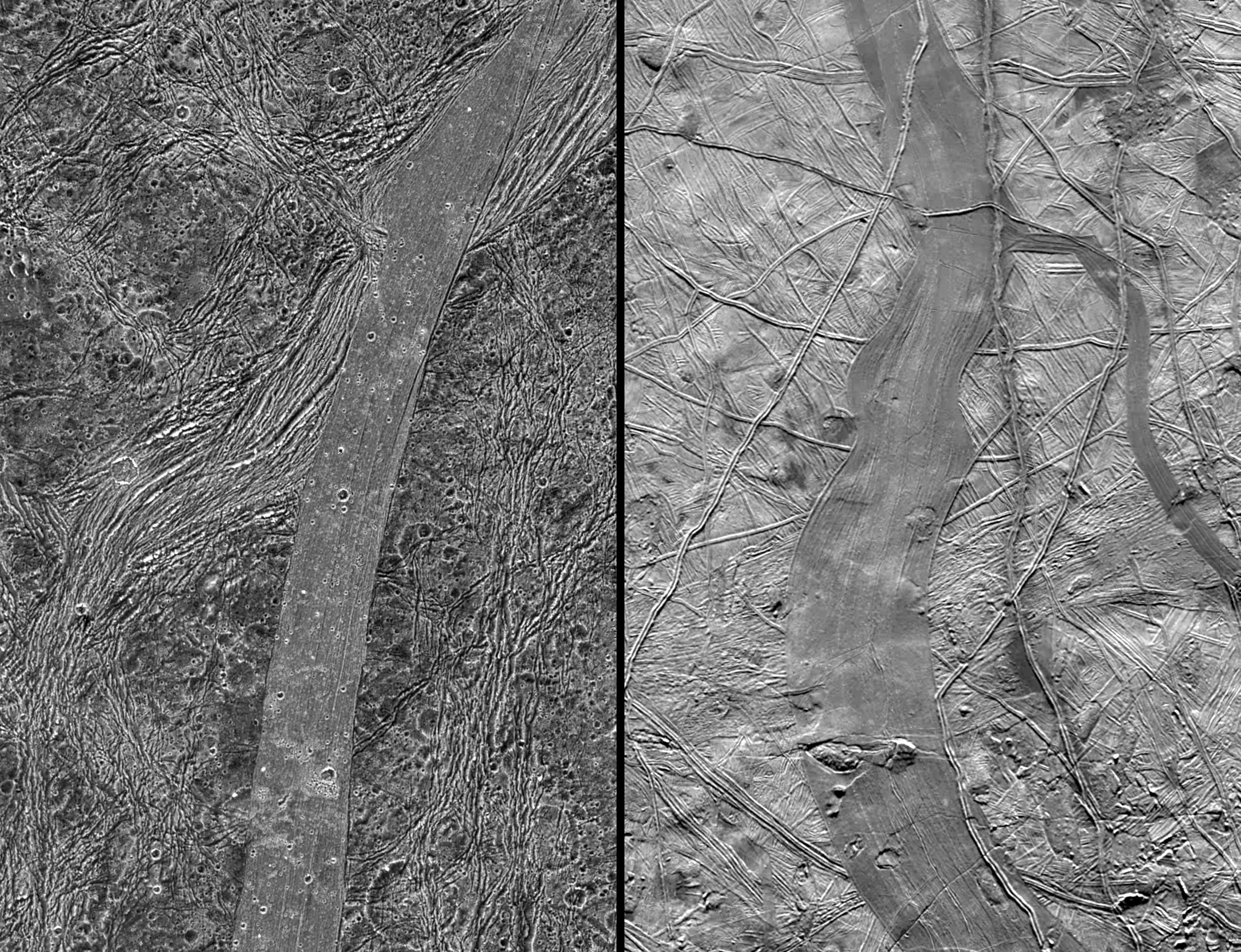
A comparison image between Arbela Sulcus on Ganymede and a similar feature on Europa, hinting at the possibility that both formed in the same way.

== See also ==
Sulcus (geology)
