= Nicholson Regio =

Dark region on Ganymede

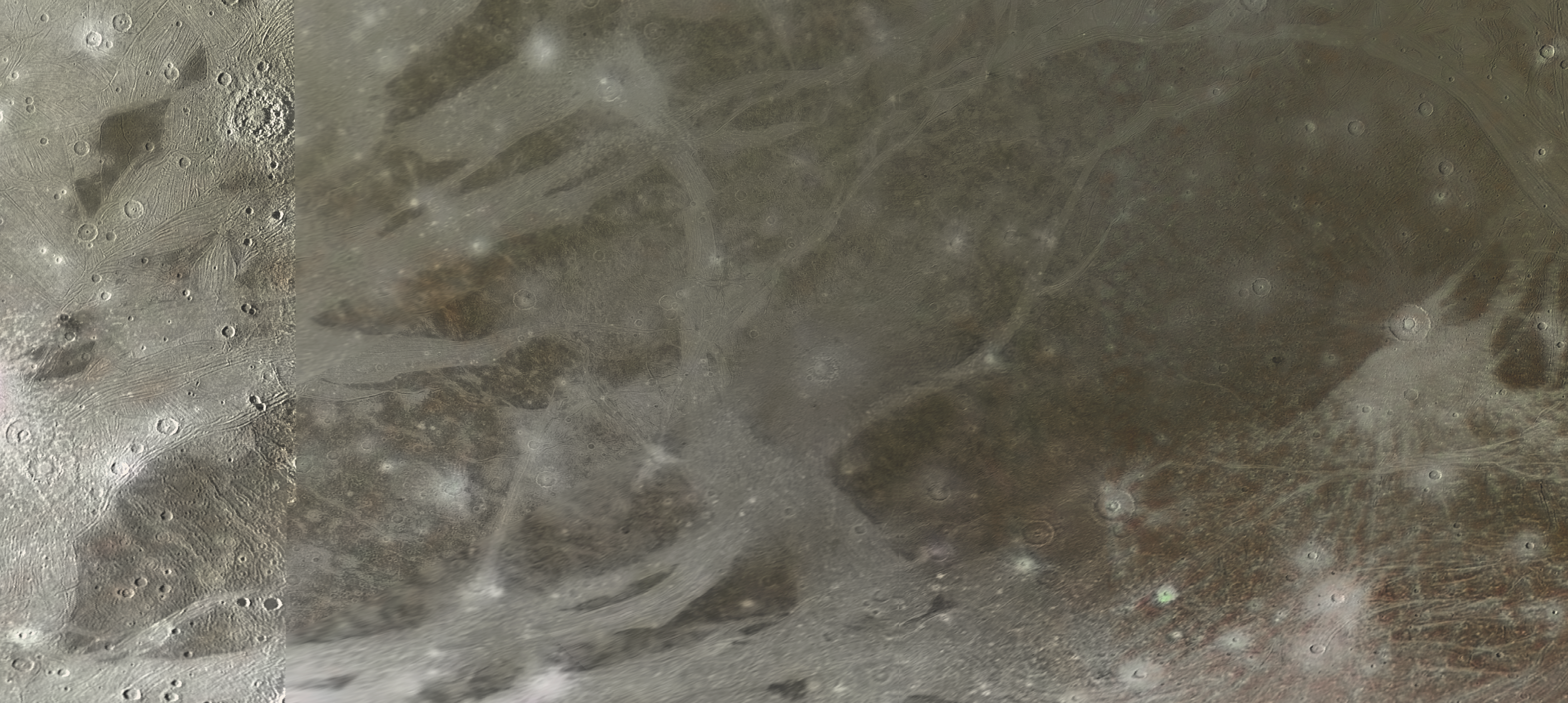
- A Mercator projection map projection of the dark Nicholson Regio.
- Feature type: Regio
- Coordinates: 33.10°S 6.40°W
- Length: 3,900 kilometres (2,400 mi)
- Eponym: Seth Barnes Nicholson

Nicholson Regio is a large, dark, surface feature on Jupiter's moon Ganymede. It is a roughly-oval feature composed of several dark, ancient areas that are dissected or interrupted by younger sulci. According to current geological studies, Nicholson Regio contains the oldest surface of Ganymede.

== Naming ==
The International Astronomical Union (IAU) follows the rule that dark areas on Ganymede (regiones) should be named after astronomers who made significant contributions to the discovery of Jupiter's moons. Nicholson Regio is named after Seth Barnes Nicholson, an American astronomer who discovered four of Jupiter's minor moons—Sinope, Lysithea, Carme and Anake. The name was approved by the IAU in 1979.

== Location ==
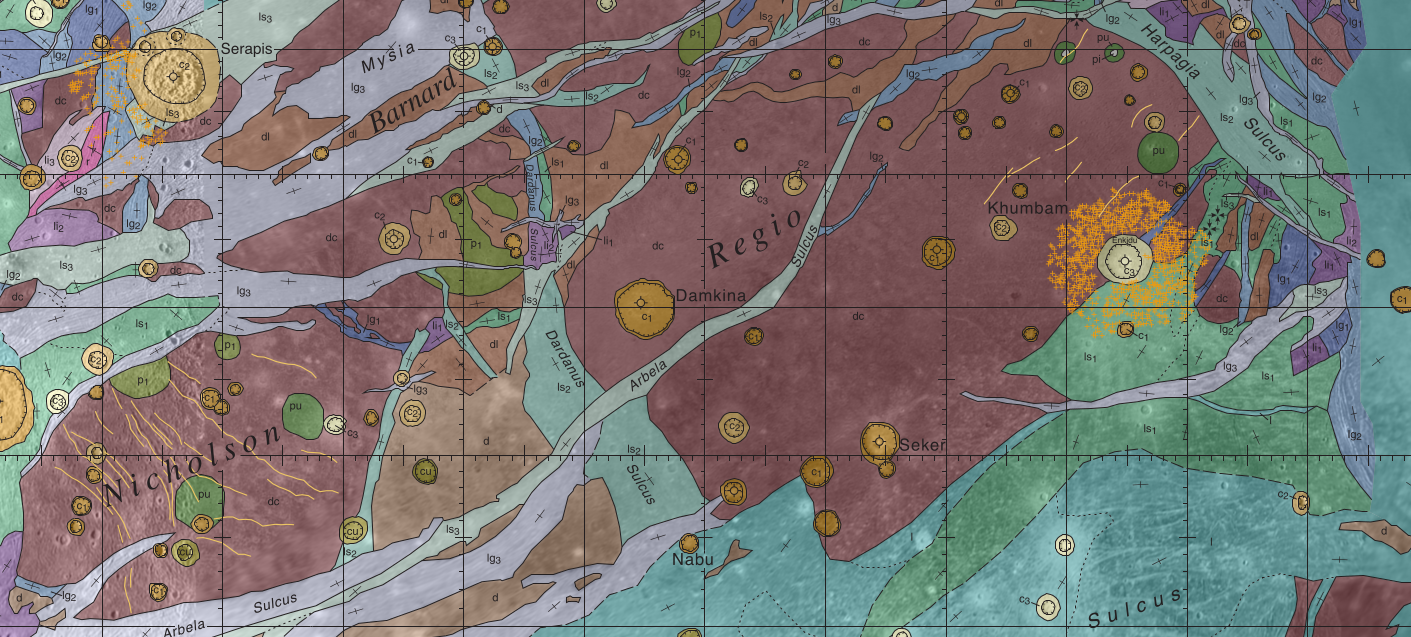
A color-coded geographic map of Nicholson Regio. The multiple colors help viewers to see the details of its topography more clearly. The dark red areas correspond to the dark, ancient areas of the regio.

Nicholson Regio is a massive, bean-shape area that covers most of the southern portion of Ganymede's Jupiter-facing hemisphere.

The dark area of Nicholson Regio is divided into three rough segments by the Arbela Sulcus and Dardanus Sulcus. Arbela Sulcus cuts the regio from its southwest to its northeast, while Dardanus Sulcus cuts from the north to its southeast.

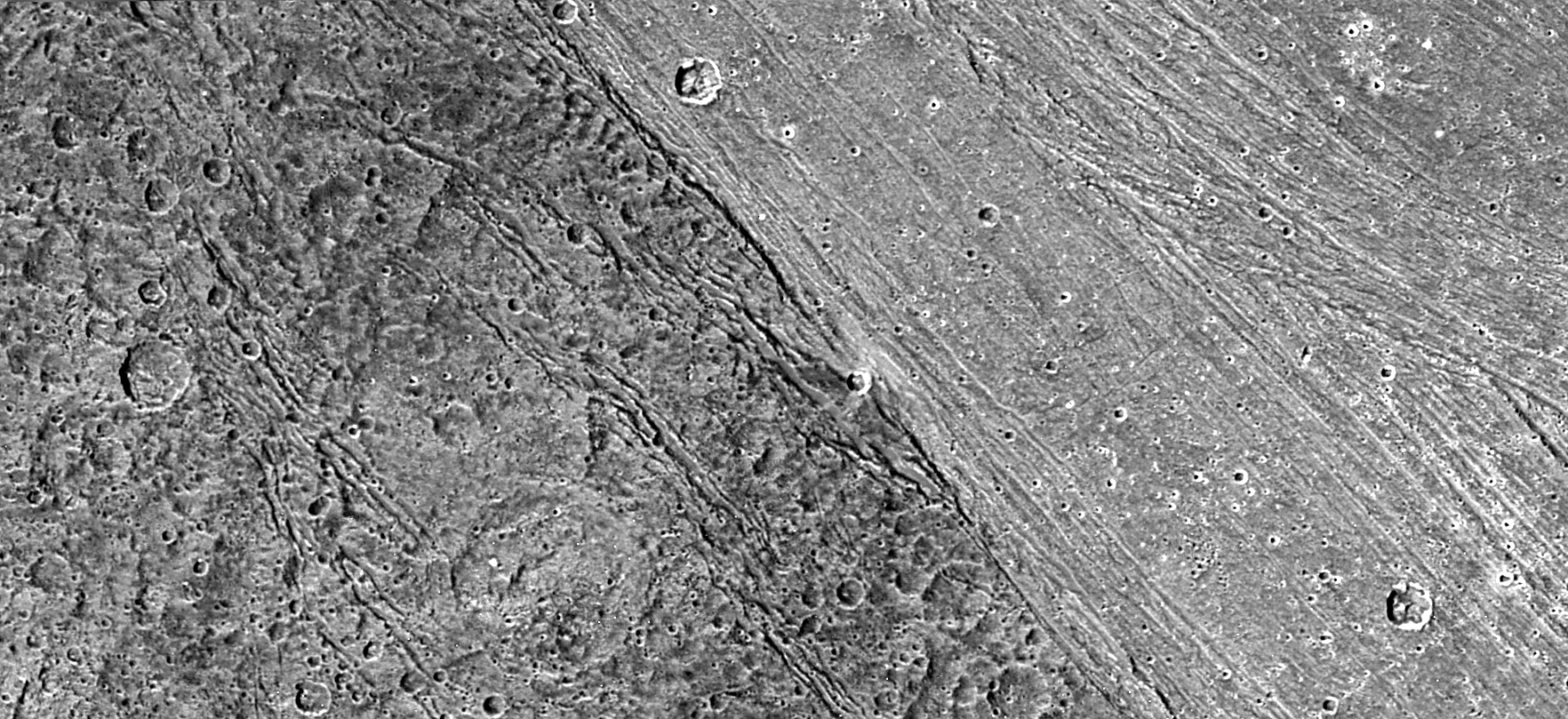
An image clearly showing the boundary and difference between the rougher, older Nicholson Regio (left) and the smoother, younger Harpagia Sulcus (right).

The narrow unnamed sulcus separates Nicholson Regio from another regio called Barnard Regio to the north, while the Harpagia Sulcus separates Nicholson from Melotte Regio to the east. The Borsippa Sulcus marks the northeastern boundary of Nicholson regio, while the southwestern boundary of the regio is marked by the rest of Arbela Sulcus.

The dark areas to the southeast of the regio are officially not considered part of Nicholson.

Nicholson Regio is part of several sections of Ganymede called quadrangles. Nicholson Regio is so massive that it is part of four quadrangles, the Dardanus, Misharu, Nabu, and Namtar quadrangles (designated as Jg6 Jg10 Jg11 and Jg14 respectively). Nicholson Regio also resides on the side of Ganymede that always faces Jupiter, caused by the moon's synchronous rotation. This means that an observer on Nicholson Regio will always see Jupiter.

== Age ==
According to the United States Geological Survey (USGS), Nicholson Regio is believed to be the oldest surface feature on Ganymede. The earliest period of Ganymede’s history is called the Nicholsonian Period, a very ancient time when the moon’s originally bright, icy surface became contaminated with dark, non-ice material, causing it to darken in a manner similar to what is observed in Nicholson Regio. The Nicholsonian Period was then followed by the Harpagian Period, during which Ganymede experienced extensive resurfacing events that largely erased the moon's earlier dark surface and replaced it with a brighter coating. Nicholson Regio represents one of the last remnants of Ganymede’s earlier, dark surface.

Like Nicholson Regio, the other dark regions on Ganymede are believed to be among the oldest parts of the moon’s surface. The dark regions on Ganymede are equivalent to the brighter highlands on the Earth's Moon in terms of age as both are considered the oldest parts of their respective moons.

== Geology and characteristics ==
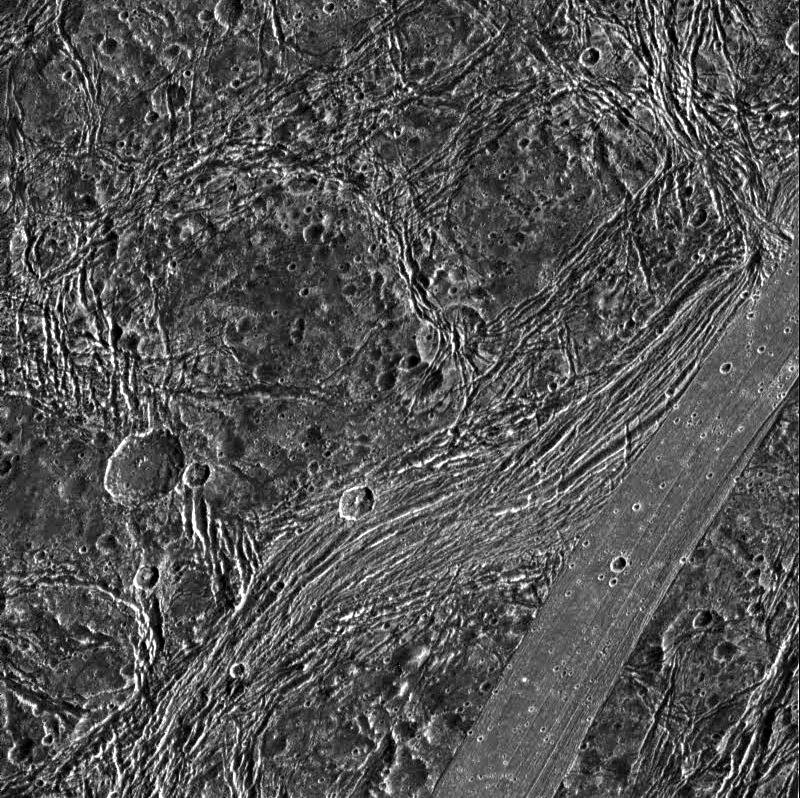
A section of Nicholson Regio as seen in this image taken by Galileo spacecraft in July 1998

Nicholson Regio is a very rugged place with a tumultuous history. Its dark areas are dominated by extremely rough terrains, cut by thousands of fractures, scarps, and other tectonic disruptions that crisscross its surface everywhere. The regio’s age allowed for the accumulation of billions of years of tectonic buckling and surface deformation. Occasionally, smoother, linear, plank-like strips of bright terrain sharply cut across the dark areas which can easily be noticed due to how different they are from the surrounding plains.

The western part of Nicholson Regio contains the darkest sections of the feature and they probably contain some of its oldest terrain. In enhanced images, it has a brownish-black color and is less red than other regiones elsewhere on Ganymede. This section is saturated with many ray craters, halo craters, and regular craters, although none of them have been given official names.

The Dardanus Sulcus sharply divides Nicholson Regio into its western and eastern lobe. It is younger and brighter compared to all dark areas of the regio. To the south of Nicholson Regio where Dardanus Sulcus terminates is the crater Nabu.

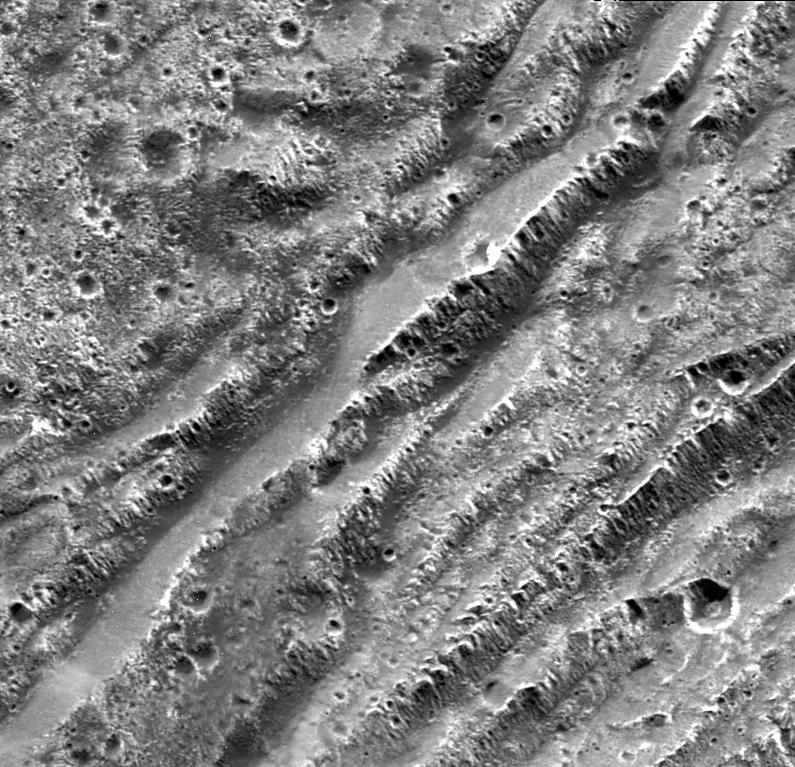
A close up image of a section of Nicholson Regio's eastern side, as seen in this image of taken by Galileo in May 2000. It shows an extremely rugged terrain

The eastern part of Nicholson Regio is also very rugged. On the side that borders Harpagia Sulcus, numerous grooves run parallel to each other, resembling a tilted stack of books, occasionally pockmarked by small craters. However, this section is lighter in color than the western side. The brighter shade suggests that the dark material has been partially erased by brighter, newer materials which is a common occurrence on Ganymede. Like its western lobe, the eastern side of Nicholson Regio is full of craters. The named craters in that region include Damkina, Khumba, Saltu and Seker. The brightest named crater in the region is the ray crater Enkidu which lies to its east. Enkidu straddles the boundary between the dark regio and the lighter terrain outside.

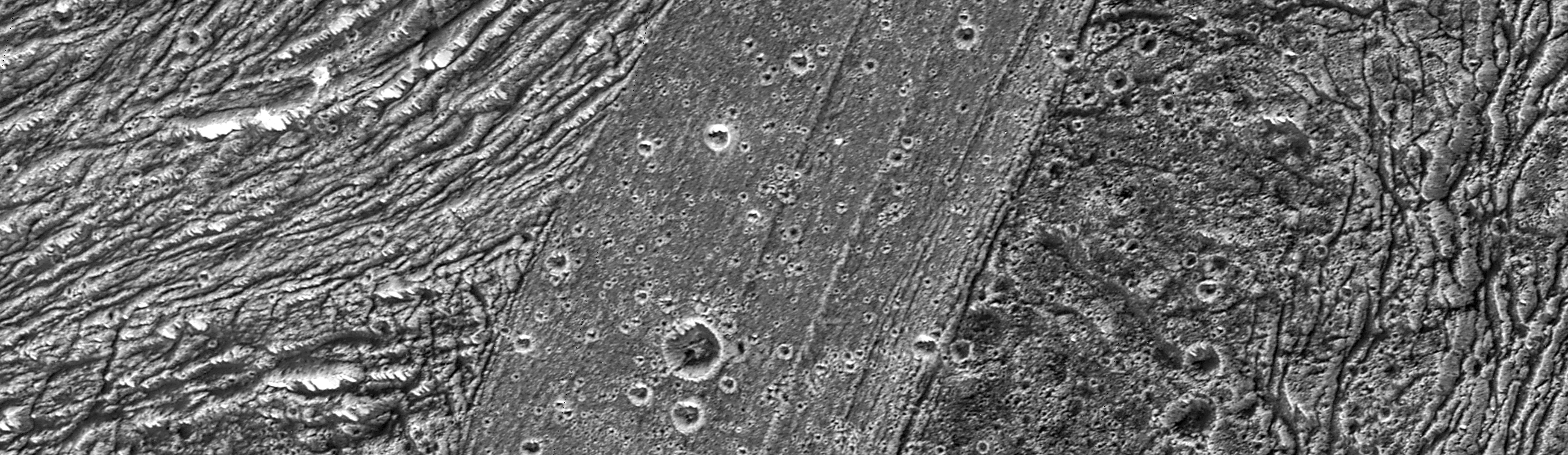
A section of Nicholson Regio's east lobe, showing the smoother and younger Arbela Sulcus sharply cutting across the rugged and older terrain around it. This image was taken by the Galileo spacecraft in May 2000.

The Arbela Sulcus is a major feature on the eastern lobe of Nicholson Regio. The sulcus snakes its way in the middle of the regio for thousands of kilometers. It is smoother and younger than the rest of Nicholson Regio and it was probably created by the stretching and faulting of the moon's icy crust. Arbela Sulcus is so smooth compared to it surrounding that it is highly noticeable in images. Arbela Sulcus further divides the eastern lobe of Nicholson Regio into a northeastern part and southeastern part.

== Relationship with other Regiones ==
A 2020 study by Hirata, Suetsugu, and Ohtsuki suggests that Ganymede may have been struck by a massive asteroid or comet approximately 4 billion years ago. The impact was likely so immense that it created a global-scale multi-ring structure. By analyzing the concentric patterns of furrow systems in Ganymede’s dark regions—including those found in Nicholson Regio—the researchers inferred that Nicholson, Barnard, Galileo, Marius, Perrine Regiones are probably remnants of a single ancient basin. This structure is analogous to Callisto’s multi-ring basins like Valhalla or Asgard, but even larger than any of them. Over billions of years, tectonic activity and active resurfacing by younger, brighter grooved terrains (now seen as Ganymede's sulci terrain) fragmented these dark regions and obscured much of the original ring pattern. Today, only traces of this colossal basin remain. If confirmed by future missions, this impact would rank among the largest known in the Solar System.

== Exploration ==
Nicholson Regio is one of the most studied and photographed parts of Ganymede. It is so massive that it can be seen even by Earth-based telescopes such as the Hubble Space Telescope. Like many other regiones, it can also be seen by amateur telescopes provided that they have enough resolving power to do so.

Voyager 1 became the first probe to send back clear images of Nicholson regio in March 1979 as it flew by Jupiter.

Galileo was able to image the regio several times as it orbited Jupiter from December 1995 to September 2003. As of 2025, the highest available resolution images of Nicholson Regio were taken by Galileo.

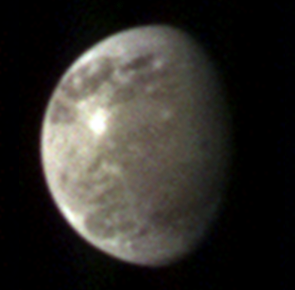
Ganymede showing Nicholson Regio (lower center). Imaged by Cassini in December 2000.

In December 2000, the Cassini space probe was able to image Nicholson Regio in low resolution.

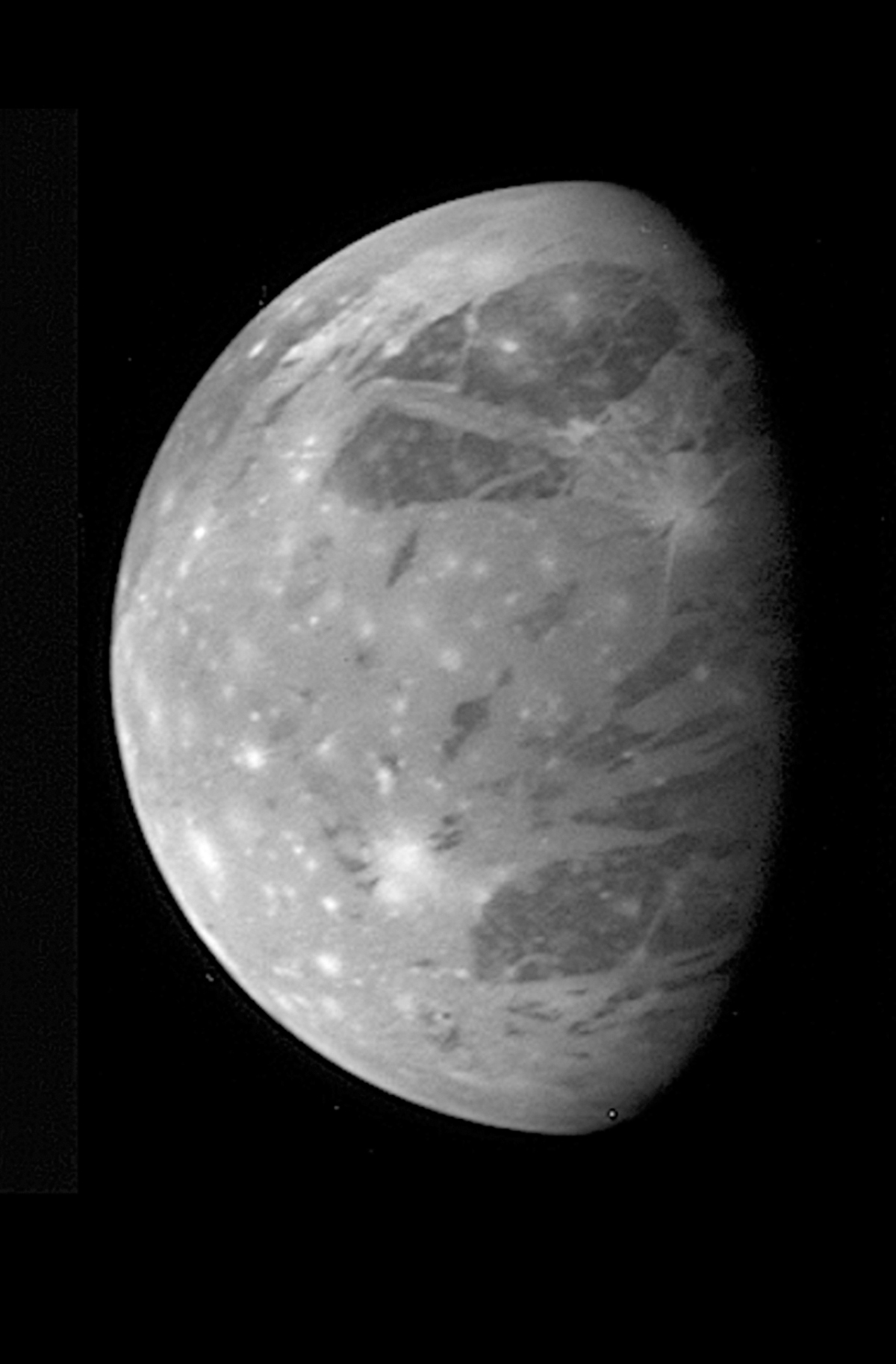
A greyscale image of Ganymede with Nicholson (lower center) photographed by the New Horizons probe, taken in February 2007.

The New Horizons probe was able to photograph about half of Nicholson Regio in February 2007. The eastern half of the regio was in darkness during the probe's quick visit.

The Juno spacecraft was barely able to photograph Nicholson Regio during its single close flyby of Ganymede. Most of the regio was behind the moon's southern limb during Juno's Perijove 34 flyby in June 2021. Only the northernmost part of Nicholson regio was photographed.

=== Future missions ===
The Jupiter Icy Moons Explorer (Juice), a space probe operated and launched by the European Space Agency's (ESA), is scheduled to arrive at Jupiter in July 2031, and in December 2034, it is expected to enter into a low orbit around Ganymede at a distance of just 500 kilometres (310 mi). Juice is expected to be able to capture even more detailed images of Nicholson Regio.

== Gallery ==
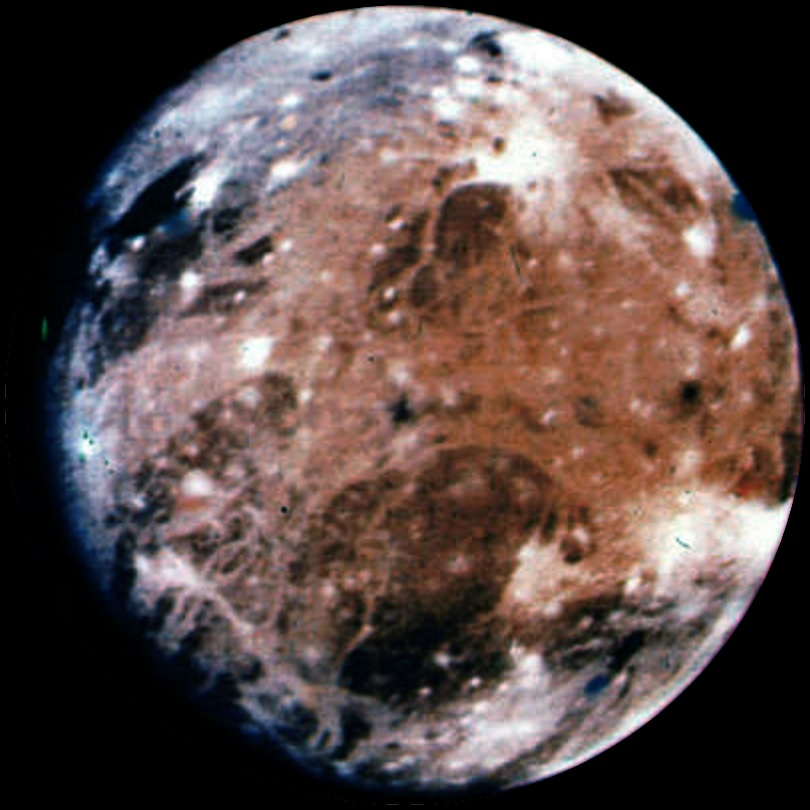
One of the first-ever clear images of Nicholson Regio (lower center), as seen in this enhanced-color image of Ganymede taken by Voyager 1 in March 1979.

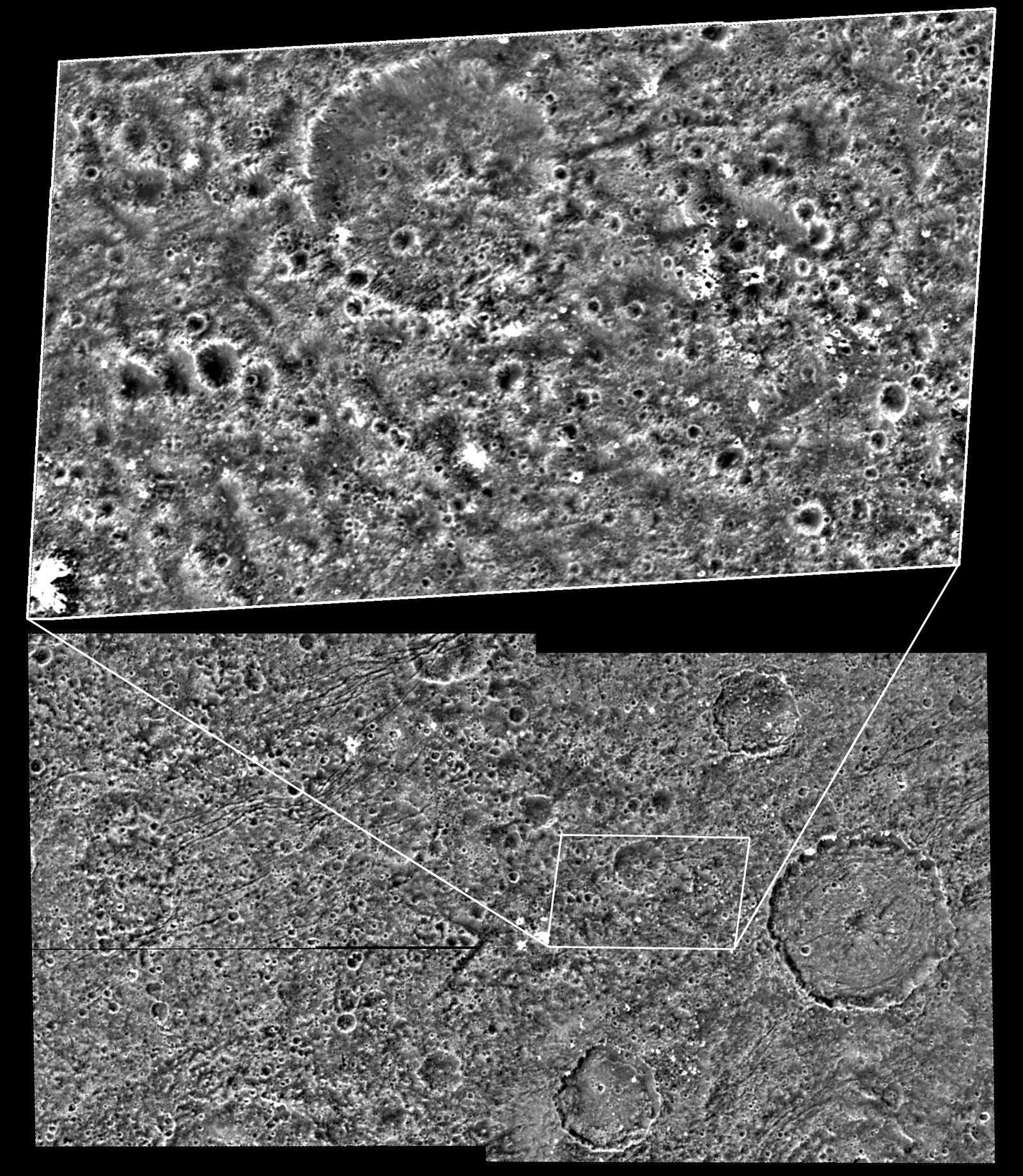
This photograph of Nicholson Regio, taken in May 2000 by Galileo, has a resolution of as high as 25 meters per pixel.

A simulated flyover view of Arbela Sulcus, showing how its grooved terrain snakes through and interrupts the rougher Nicholson Regio through resurfacing processes.

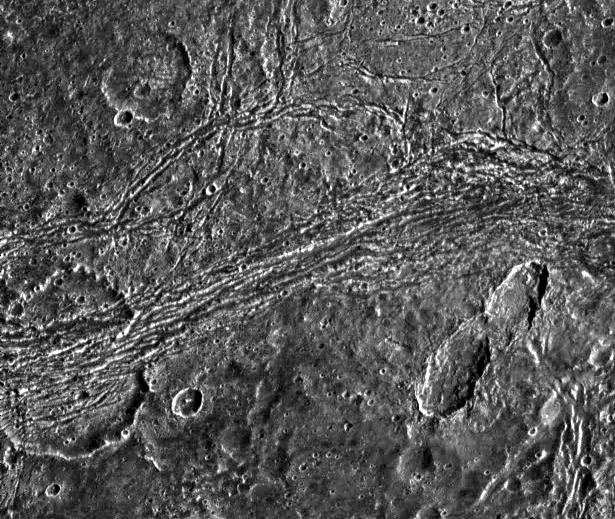
An image of the strained and heavily damaged Saltu crater (lower left) within Nicholson Regio, taken by the Galileo space probe in April 1997.
