= Seker (crater) =

Crater on Ganymede

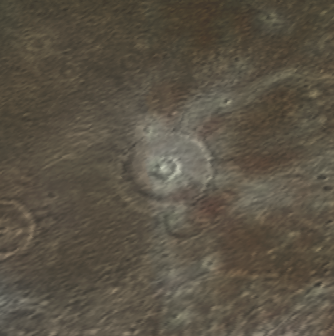
- A Mercator projection image of Seker crater.
- Feature type: Bright halo dome crater
- Coordinates: 39.16°S 345.38°W
- Diameter: 103 kilometres (64 mi)
- Eponym: Seker

Seker is a bright halo ray crater with a dome at its center on Jupiter's largest moon Ganymede. The crater is 103 kilometres (64 mi) wide.

== Naming ==
Seker is named after an obscure hawk-headed god from Egyptian mythology who guarded the tombs in the city of Memphis, the ancient capital of Ancient Egypt.

The name for Seker was approved in 1988 by the International Astronomical Union (IAU), the organization responsible for formally naming celestial bodies and their geological features, following the convention that craters on Ganymede should be named after deities, heroes, and places from Middle Eastern mythology, including Egyptian mythology.

== Location ==
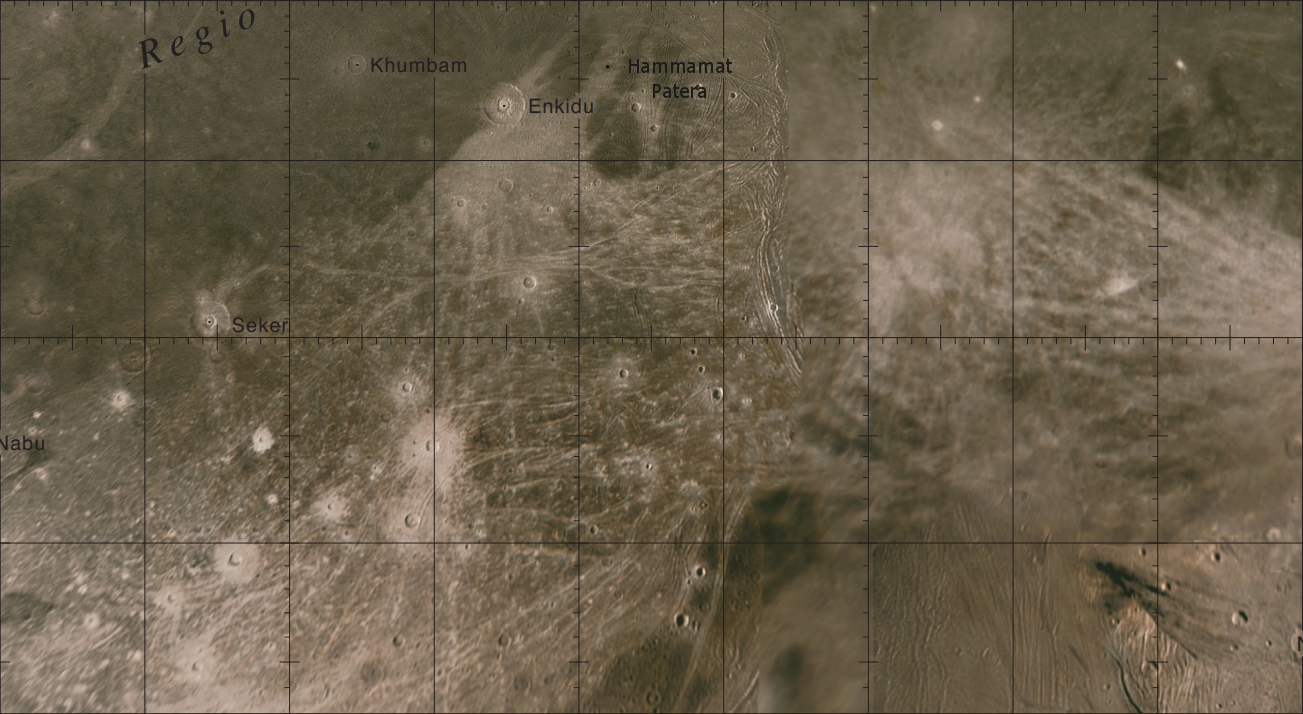
A map of the Namtar quadrangle on Ganymede, showing Seker's location.

Seker is located in the southeast hemisphere of Ganymede. It lies near the boundary between the dark, ancient terrain known as Nicholson Regio and the younger, smoother terrain called Borsippa Sulcus.

The crater is within the Namtar quadrangle (or section) of Ganymede (designated Jg14).

Seker crater lies on the hemisphere of Ganymede that permanently faces its parent planet, a consequence of the moon's synchronous rotation around Jupiter. Consequently, an observer standing at Seker would always see Jupiter in the sky. (Note: For moons in synchronous rotation, such as Ganymede, 0° longitude corresponds to the part of the surface that always faces Jupiter. Regions between 90° W to 0° to 270° W longitude always face the moon’s parent planet.)

== Age and Morphology ==
Seker is a crater with a bright floor and a dome at its center. It also exhibits broken rays, but most of them are very faint, likely because Seker is an ancient crater and its rays have largely been erased by space weathering.

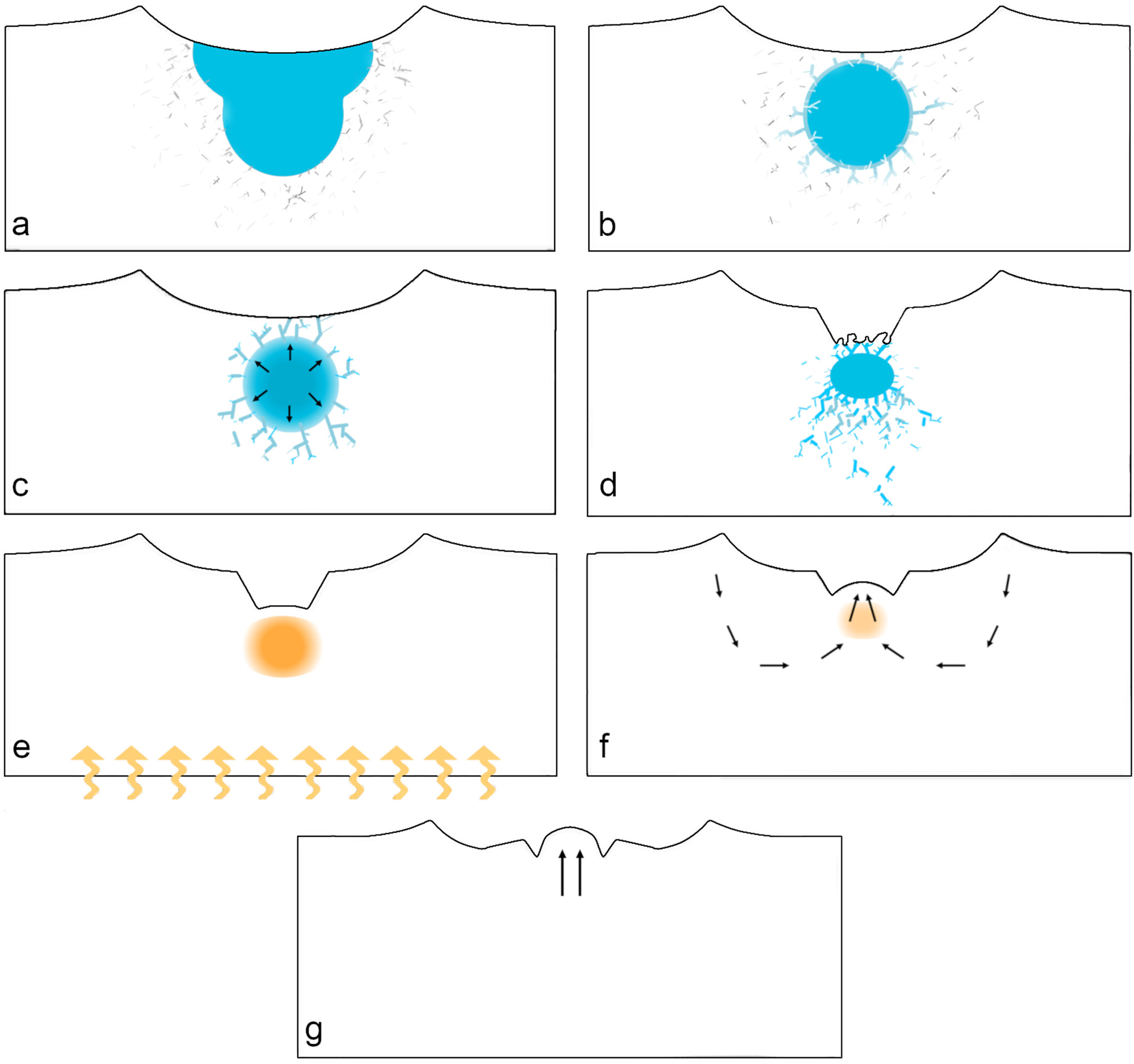
A diagram illustrating the formation of dome craters on icy moons. It shows how the refreezing of meltwater from meteorite impacts can create sinkholes, forming pit craters, and how the subsequent expansion of the freezing meltwater pushes up the crater floor to form an icy dome.

Seker's outer crater rim 103 kilometres (64 mi) wide, and it is one of Ganymede's dome craters.

Research suggests that Seker's central dome formed from meltwater produced beneath the crater when heat from the asteroid impact melted Ganymede's icy surface. As this meltwater refroze, it fractured and weakened the subsurface, causing the crater's center to collapse and form a circular pit resembling a sinkhole. Continued freezing led the meltwater to expand, uplifting the crater floor and ultimately creating an icy dome. Such domes typically develop only in craters wider than 60 kilometres (37 mi).

== Exploration and Observation ==
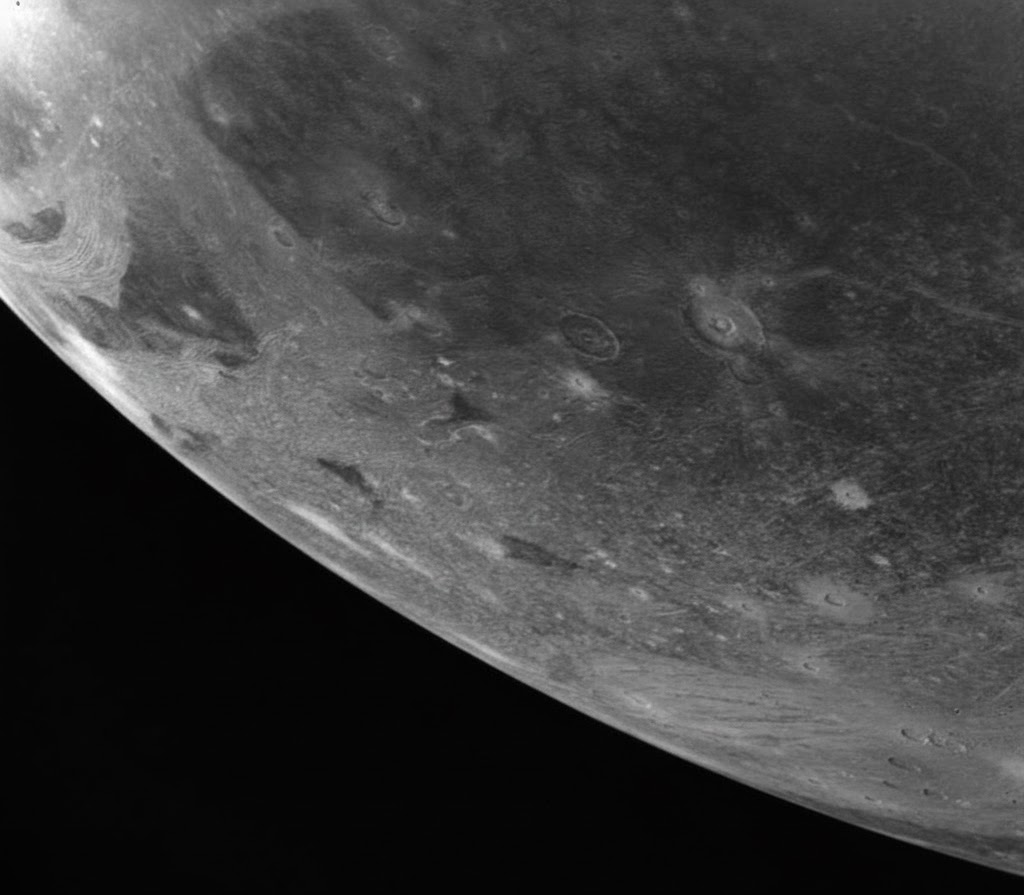
A narrow angle image of the southern hemisphere of Ganymede, showing Seker crater (slightly to the right from the center), taken by Voyager 1 in March 1979. The dark area to the north of Seker is Nicholson Regio.

As of 2026, the only spacecraft that has imaged Seker is Voyager 1, which did so during the probe's brief flyby of Ganymede and Jupiter in March 1979. It captured a single image of Seker and its surrounding terrain, which remains the only clear view of the crater to date.

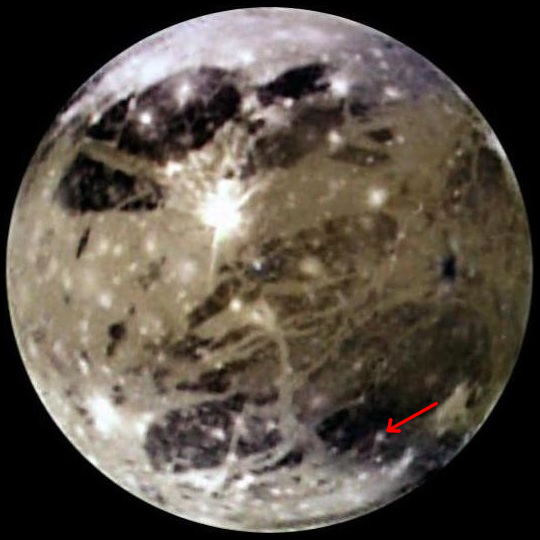
An image of the Jupiter-facing hemisphere of Ganymede, showing Seker crater (shown by the red arrow). This image was taken by Galileo in September 1997.

During its orbit around Jupiter from December 1995 to September 2003, the Galileo space probe was not able to obtain close-up images of Seker crater. The probe only managed to image the crater during a distant flyby in September 1997.

=== Future missions ===
The European Space Agency's (ESA) flagship mission called the Jupiter Icy Moons Explorer (Juice) is scheduled to arrive at Jupiter in July 2031. After spending approximately three and a half years in orbit around Jupiter and performing multiple flybys of Europa, Ganymede and Callisto, Juice will settle into a low orbit around Ganymede at a distance of as low as 500 kilometres (310 mi) in 2034.

== See also ==
- List of craters on Ganymede
- Meteor
