= Humbaba (crater) =

Crater on Ganymede

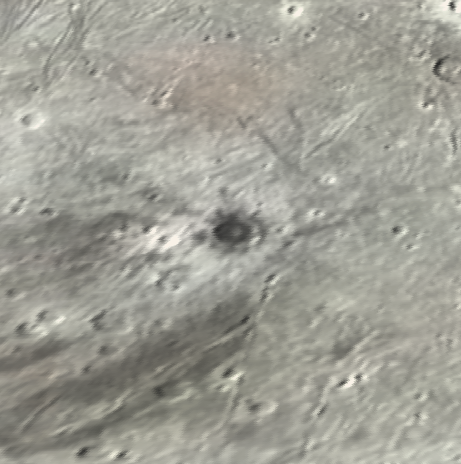
- A Mercator projection image of Humbaba crater, taken by the Galileo space probe on 26 June 1997.
- Feature type: Dark halo crater
- Coordinates: 55.15°S 67.31°W
- Diameter: 40.0 kilometres (24.9 mi)
- Eponym: Humbaba

Humbaba is a crater on Jupiter's moon Ganymede. It is approximately 40 km (25 mi) in diameter and it exhibits a dark ray system, a rare type of feature on Ganymede. This makes Humbaba the largest dark crater on Ganymede.

== Naming ==
Humbaba is named after a mighty creature from Mesopotamian mythology known as Humbaba, who was the guardian of the cedar forest where the gods lived. According to the ancient story of the Epic of Gilgamesh, after King Gilgamesh became friends with the wild man Enkidu following a wrestling match that ended in a stalemate, he suggested that they embark on adventures together to immortalize their names in history. Gilgamesh proposed that they defeat and slay Humbaba to accomplish this.

The International Astronomical Union (IAU) has ruled that craters on Ganymede's surface should be named after deities, heroes and places from Ancient Middle Eastern mythology, which includes Mesopotamian mythology. The IAU approved Kittu's name in the year 2000.

== Location ==
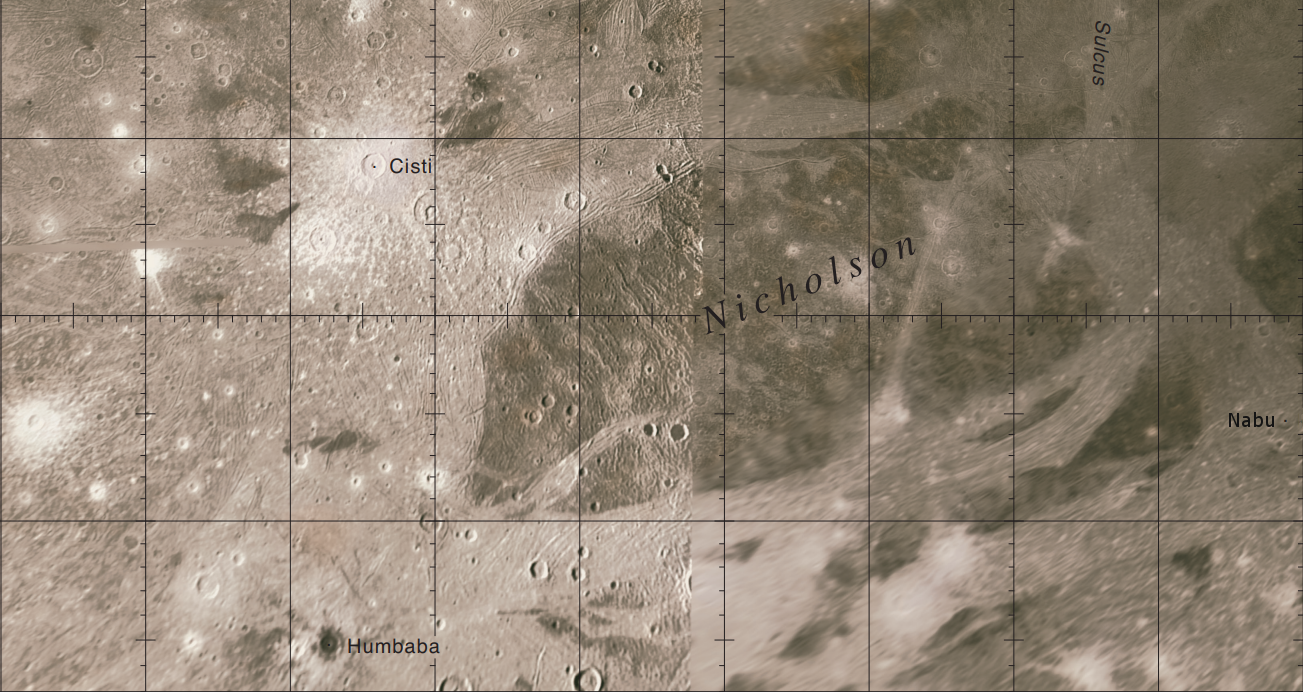
The Nabu quadrangle of Ganymede. Humbaba is on the lower left of the map.

Humbaba crater is located in the southern latitudes of Ganymede, about two-thirds of the way from the equator to the moon's south pole. To its west lies the sprawling grooved terrain known as Babylon Sulci, while to its east is the dark, ancient region called Nicholson Regio.

Humbaba is part of the Nabu crater quadrangle of Ganymede (designated Jg11). It is located near the southwestern corner of the quadrangle.

Humbaba is located on the side of Ganymede that is always facing Jupiter—a result of the moon's synchronous rotation—near its subjovian point (i.e. the point on a moon directly facing Jupiter where the planet will always be overhead). This means that an observer standing inside Humbaba crater will always see Jupiter almost overhead at all times. (Note: For moons in synchronous rotation, such as Ganymede, 0° longitude corresponds to the part of the surface that always faces Jupiter. Regions between 90° W to 0° to 270° W longitude always face the moon's parent planet.)

== Morphology ==
Humbaba is approximately 40 km (25 mi) wide. The crater has a dark interior and exhibits a unique double halo configuration, characterized by dark ejecta material surrounded by bright ejecta. This makes Humbaba the widest dark crater on Ganymede.

The source of the dark material is still debated. According to a study by Namitha Baby, the dark material was excavated by the impactor from about 3 kilometres (1.9 mi) to 5.6 kilometres (3.5 mi) below Ganymede's surface.

On the other hand, Dr. Paul Schenk's studies emphasize the possibility that the dark material within and around dark craters originated from the impactors themselves, which spread the material on the moon's surface during impact.

== Exploration ==
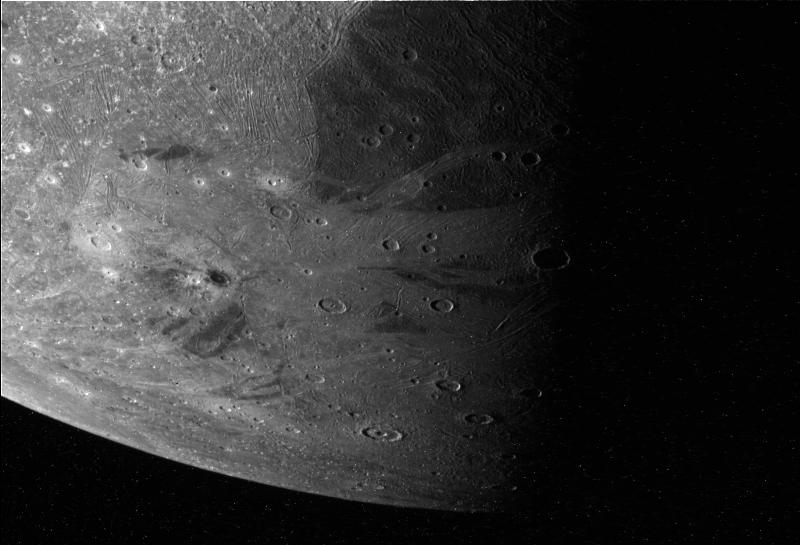
An image of Ganymede's southern hemisphere, showing Humbaba crater (halfway from the center to the left side of the image). This image was taken by Galileo in June 1997. The dark area in the upper right corner is Nicholson Regio.

Galileo was the first spacecraft to image Humbaba crater. During its orbit around Jupiter from December 1995 to September 2003, the probe flew by Ganymede several times. During a close encounter with the moon in June 1997, Galileo captured high-resolution images of Humbaba and its surrounding terrain. As of 2026, Galileo's images remain the highest-quality views of Humbaba available.

=== Future Missions ===
The European Space Agency's (ESA) Jupiter Icy Moons Explorer (Juice), launched in April 2023, is scheduled to reach Jupiter in July 2031. In July 2034, Juice is expected to enter a low orbit around Ganymede at an altitude of approximately 500 kilometres (310 mi). The high-resolution images of Humbaba crater that will be returned by the spacecraft are expected to help planetary scientists better understand the nature of Ganymede's unique dark craters.

== See also ==
- List of craters on Ganymede
- Meteor
