= Tectonics on icy moons =

Overview of tectonics on icy moons

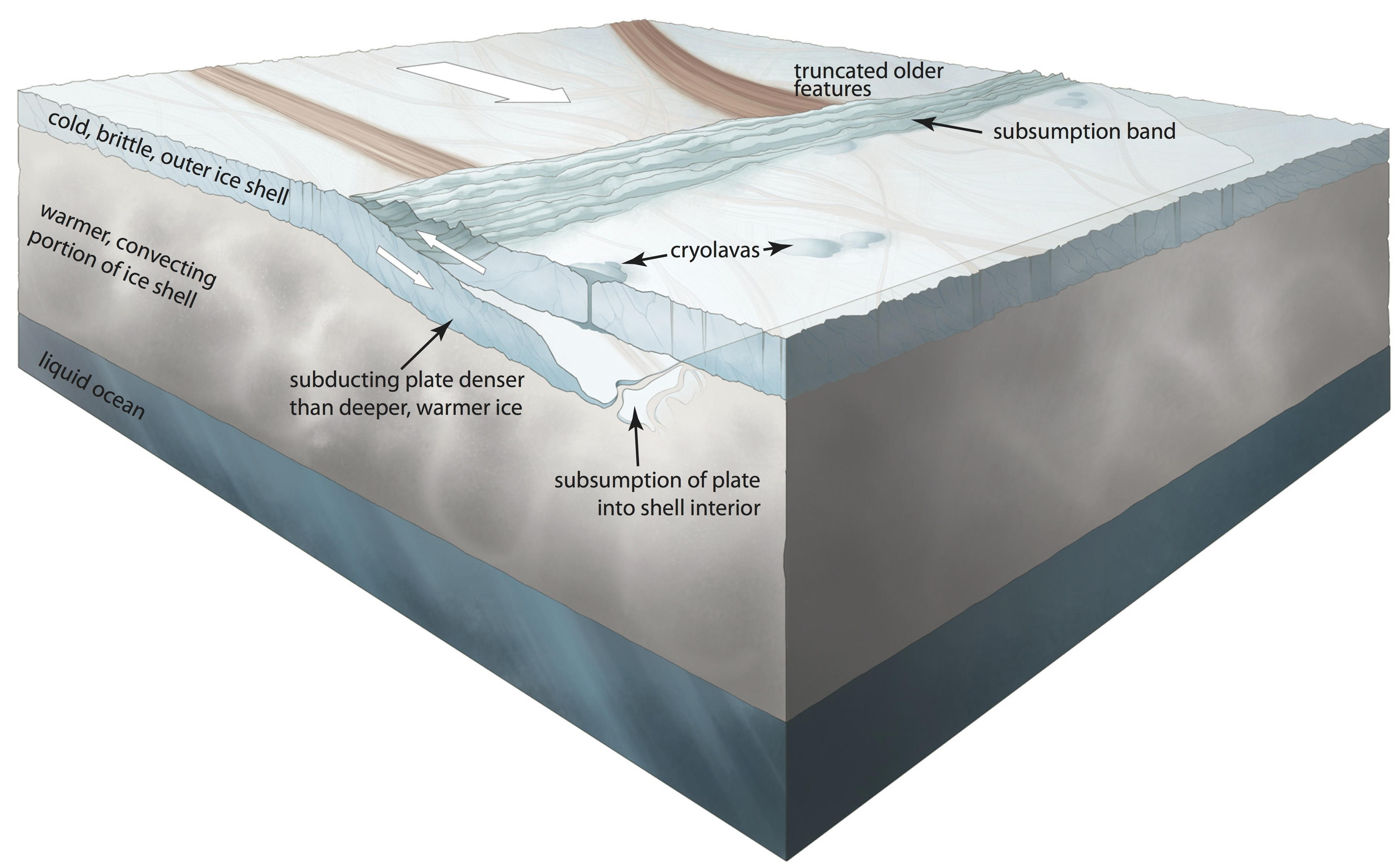
Diagram of plate tectonics on one of the moons of Jupiter, Europa.

Tectonic activities have been studied on several icy moons.

== Background ==
Igneous activity on icy moons can be defined as the melting, ascension, and solidification of liquids, particularly water and its ice polymorphs. Tectonic features on icy lithospheres occur by global and regional stresses acting on the moon's interior. Fractures in the icy lithosphere influence the mechanisms by which the lithosphere reacts to stress. An unfractured ice lithosphere has a greater shear strength than tensile strength, and accordingly, compressional deformation must occur by shear failure and cause thrust and strike-slip faulting. Conversely, prefractured ice has much less shear strength, and extensional stress will produce normal faults and graben.

Residual heat from accretion is one possible source of internal heat for icy moons. But only moons with radii greater than about 2000 km are thought to be massive enough to melt pure water-ice in the outer layers. Tidal heating and the decay of radioactive elements are another possible source of internal heat on icy moons. Warming of a cold interior would cause the satellite to expand and undergo tensional stress on the surface. Cooling, on the other hand, would cause contraction and compression. Mantle convection likely occurred within most icy moons, but is not an important source of lithospheric stress.

Asteroid and comet impacts are another source of thermal and seismic energy on icy moons. Impacts could produce melt pools, reactivation of older faults and/or cracks, and deformation to the region antipodal to the impact site. Impacts may impart three general fracture patterns on the icy moon: (1) a global system of radially symmetric fractures originating from the impact site, (2) concentric and radial fractures, and (3) collapse of an impact basin with radial and concentric troughs.

Most icy satellites rotate synchronously. If the satellite rotated more rapidly during formation, rotation becomes synchronous within 1,000-1,000,000 years due to tidal friction. A decrease in rotational speed decreases the oblateness of the icy moon, which reduces principle stress in the north–south direction, thereby creating east–west trending dikes. If tidal friction causes the lithosphere to fail, east west extensional features should be expected near the poles, northeast/northwest strike slip features at mid-latitudes, and north–south compressional features at the equator. The transfer of angular momentum from the planet to the orbiting moon causes the moon's orbital distance to increase with time. As a consequence of increasing orbital distance, the tidal bulge decreases. These stresses should produce compression at the planet facing and antipode positions, extension at the poles, and strike-slip faults oriented northeast/northwest elsewhere.

== Plate tectonics ==
Some of the satellites of Jupiter have features that may be related to plate-tectonic style deformation, although the materials and specific mechanisms may be different from plate-tectonic activity on Earth. On 8 September 2014, NASA reported finding evidence of plate tectonics on Europa, a satellite of Jupiter—the first sign of subduction activity on another world other than Earth. Titan, the largest moon of Saturn, was reported to show tectonic activity in images taken by the Huygens probe, which landed on Titan on January 14, 2005.

The mechanisms of plate tectonics on icy moons, particularly Earth-like plate tectonics are not widely agreed upon or well understood. Plate tectonics on Earth is hypothesized to be driven by “slab pull,” where the sinking of the more dense subducting plate provides the spreading force for mid-ocean ridges. “Ridge push” is comparatively weak in Earth's plate tectonics. Extensional features are abundant on icy moons, but compressional features are sparse. Furthermore, subducting less dense ice into a more dense fluid is difficult to explain. Force balance modeling suggests that subduction is likely to create large scale topographic forcing across icy moons, because the buoyant force is orders of magnitude greater than subducting forces. Fracturing and plate-like motion is more easily explained by volume changes and ice-shell motion that is decoupled from interior motion.

== Tectonic and volcanic features ==
=== Trough and Scarp Sets ===
Linear troughs, chains of pits, and scarps in coherent orientations have been observed on Mimas, Tethys, Rhea, Iapetus, Umbriel, Europa, and Ganymede. These features are thought to be formed from impacts or tidal forcing.

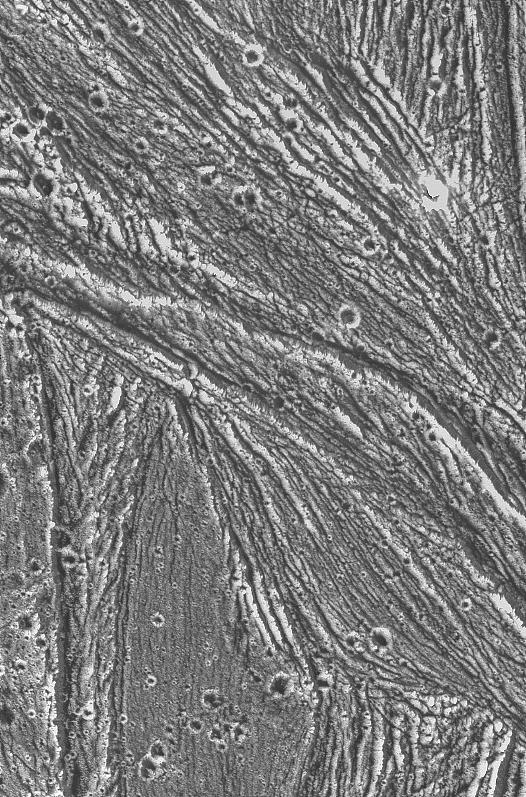
Ridges, grooves, craters and relatively smooth areas in the Uruk Sulcus region of Jupiter's moon Ganymede.

=== Scarps and troughs traversing older material ===
These features are similar in appearance to trough and scarp sets, but appear geologically distinct from the terrain in which they traverse. It is thought that the troughs are younger material. These features are considered normal faults and rifts formed by extensional tectonics. However, on Dione and Tethys, large impacts may have produced traversing scarps and troughs.

=== Linear and curvilinear ridges ===
Ridges are uncommon, but have been observed on Rhea, Dione, and Ganymede. Ridges are thought to form by compression or transpression.

=== Concentric and radial scarps and furrows ===
Collapsed impact basins are thought to form concentric and radial scarps. The Valhalla ring system on Callisto is one of the most well-preserved examples of these features. Concentric furrows on Ganymede's dark terrain appear, but only as troughs and without scarps.

=== Volcanism ===
Four processes may produce volcanic activity on icy moons: (1) mantle convection, (2) negative diapirism, (3) impact cratering, and (4) antipodal fracturing in response to a large impact. The strongest evidence for volcanism is found in the polygonal coronae on Miranda, a large, fractured and resurfaced region embedded within a heavily cratered region.

=== Grooved terrain ===
Grooved terrain refers to features that are parallel or subparallel, dissect older terrain, are often associated with lighter colored terrain, and are negative relief structures rather than raised. The negative topography suggests that these features formed from global expansion of the icy moon, although some suggest the features formed by reactivation of older structures.

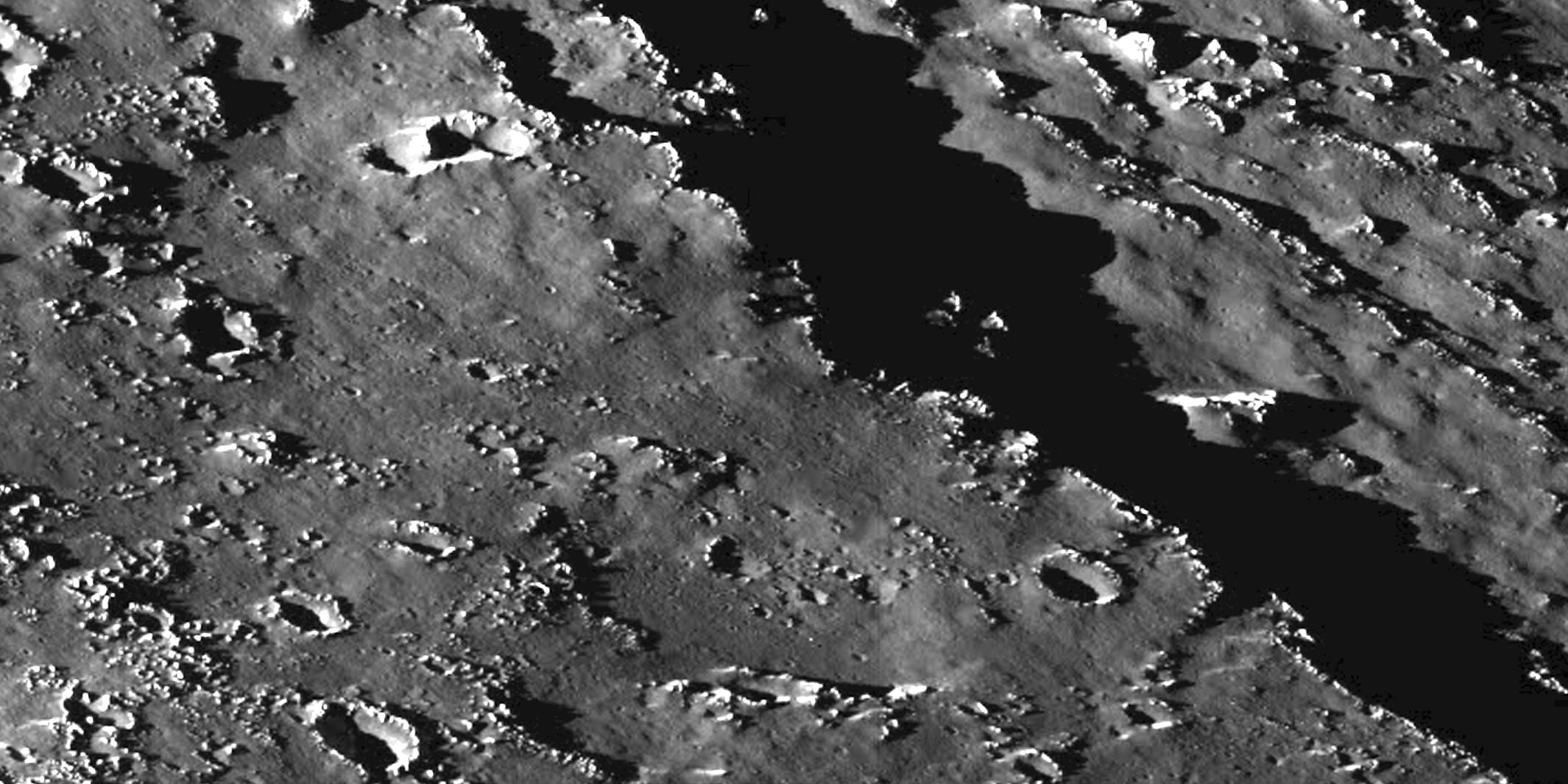
This mosaic of two images shows an area within the Valhalla region on Jupiter's moon, Callisto. North is to the top of the mosaic and the Sun illuminates the surface from the left. The smallest details that can be discerned in this picture are knobs and small impact craters about 155 meters (170 yards) across. The resolution is 46 meters (50 yards) per picture element, and the mosaic covers an area approximately 33 kilometers (21 miles) across. A prominent fault scarp crosses the mosaic. This scarp is one of many structural features that form the Valhalla multi-ring structure.

== Observations ==
=== Europa ===
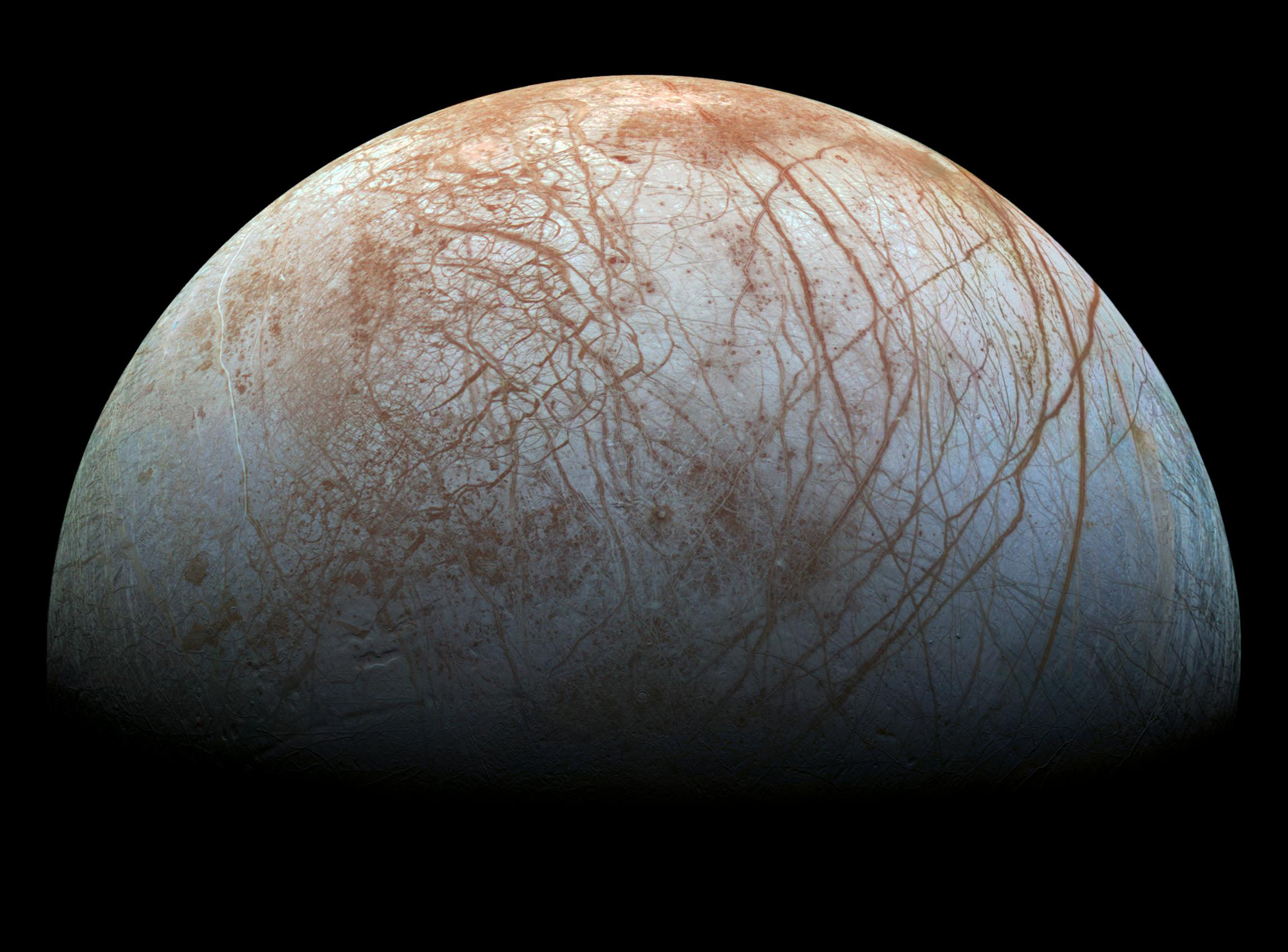
Europa

Voyager 2 and Galileo mission imagery revealed a highly fractured surface on Europa devoid of cratering, suggesting that the surface is regularly young and subject to resurfacing. Dilational bands appear morphologically similar to spreading ridges on Earth, and therefore suggest that warm ice ascends upwards to form the bands. However, compressional deformation features are sparse and too small to accommodate spreading from the dilational bands. A subduction mechanism is a key to the ice tectonics hypothesis on Europa. For subduction to occur, convection within or below the ice crust must exert stresses that exceed the strength of the overlying ice crust. But to hold a tenable tectonics hypothesis, one must explain how ice sinks below the surface. If the crustal ice porosity exceeds ~1%, subduction is unlikely, but the high concentrations of salt within the ice make subduction possible with porisities up to 10%. Subduction may occur if differences in salt content exceed 5% between the overriding plate and the subducting plate. However, the processes and conditions that initiate subduction are still poorly explained.

Europa's ice crust may be fractured by tidal stresses from Jupiter, and it has been hypothesized that liquid water could reach the surface through these cracks. However, the ice overburden pressure within the crust exceeds tidal stresses at depths greater than 35 m below the ice surface, thereby limiting the depth at which tidally-induced cracks can propagate. Furthermore, liquid water within any cracks will rapidly freeze. Therefore, a source other than tidal forcing must place the crust under tension for cracks to propagate deeply. Tides may force strike-slip motion along cracks, and this lateral motion would produce heat within the crack and make the ice more susceptible to ductile flow. The warmer and less viscous ice along the cracks is less dense than the surrounding ice, and may flow upwards to the surface. Melt generated within these fractures may briefly exist near the surface before percolating downward to the subsurface ocean over thousand year timescales.

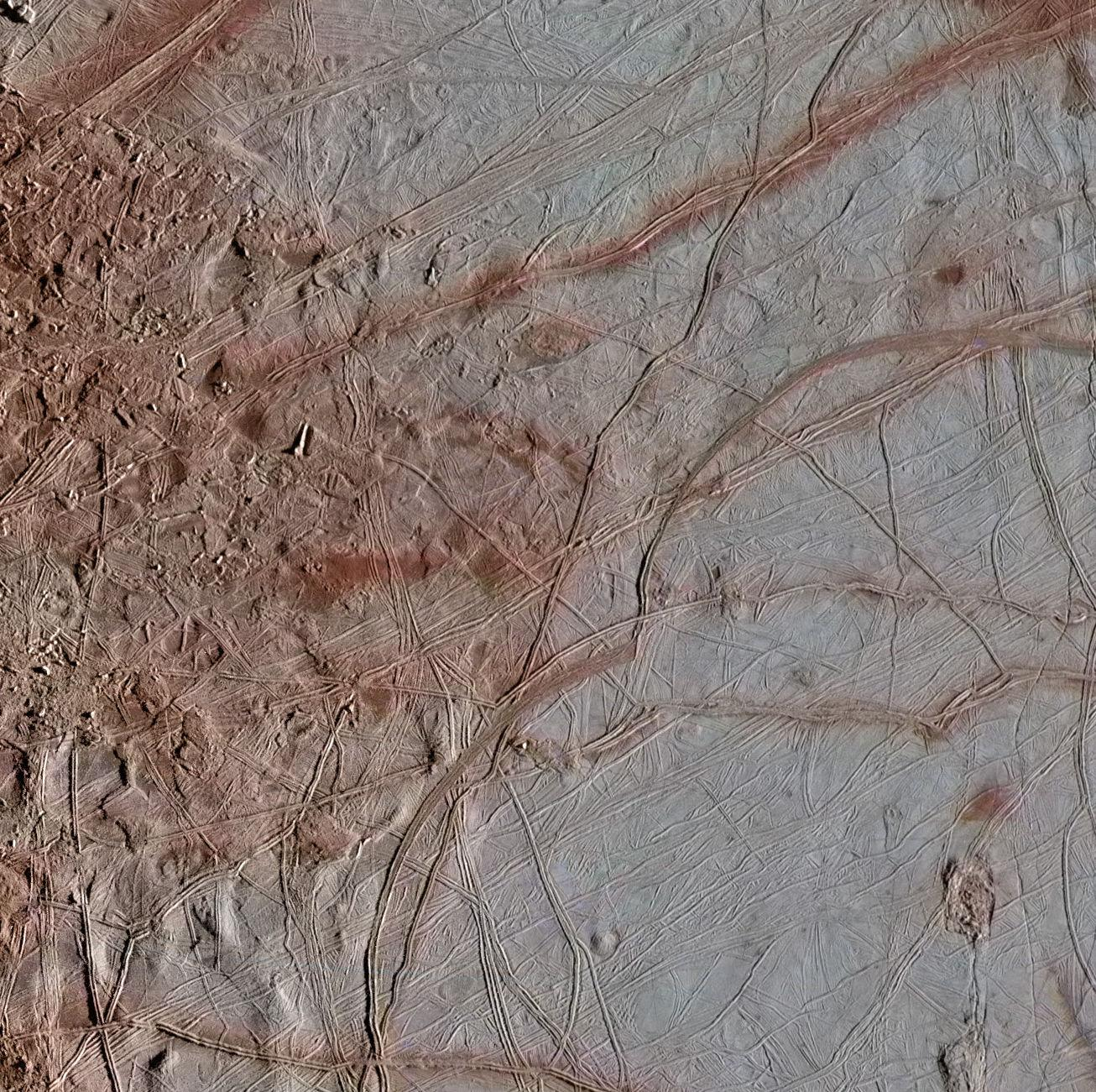
Chaos terrain on the left side of this image of Europa transitions to smooth terrain.

Truncated surface features suggest that subduction on Europa may occur along tabular zones. Unlike subduction on Earth, differences in the strengths and relative densities of Europan ice, it is unlikely that the subducting ice plate is “pulled” into the subsurface ocean. Instead, it is most likely incorporated into the ice composing the overriding plate. Surface features that intersect tabular zones do not continue on the other side, unlike across strike-slip and dilational faults.

Strike-slip faults in the northern hemisphere of Europa are predominantly left-lateral, while those in the southern hemisphere are predominantly right-lateral. This dichotomy becomes more pronounced the further the fault is from the equator. To explain this, the shell tectonics hypothesis describes a mechanism for strike-slip motion along faults driven by tidal forces from Jupiter. Numerical simulations of shell tectonics strike-slip faulting agrees closely with observations. However, the shell tectonics model requires that a substantial number of fractures or faults already exist on the surface.

Convection and advection within the liquid ocean can transport and freeze liquid water into the ice crust, and that ocean-origin material may potentially reach the surface. However, the forces that drive extension in the ice crust are not well known. Slab pull, where a subducting ice plate pulls the crust apart at divergent boundaries is unlikely to drive extension because ice is less dense than liquid water, and therefore unable to sink into the subsurface ocean.

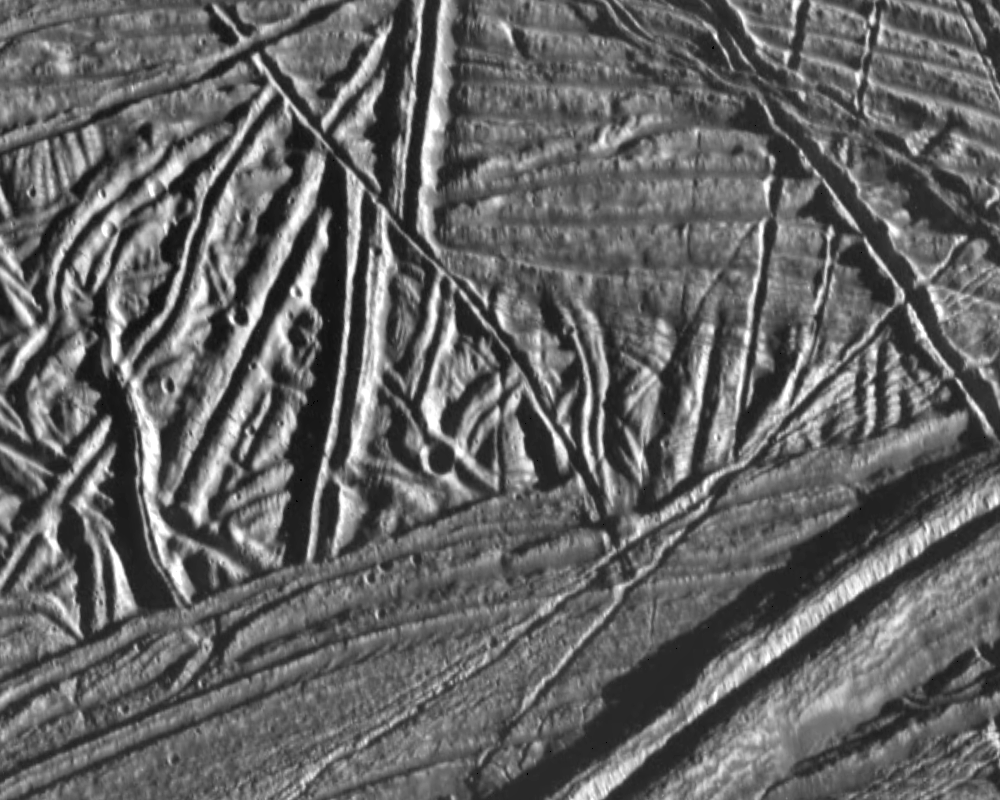
Ridges and fractures on Europa.

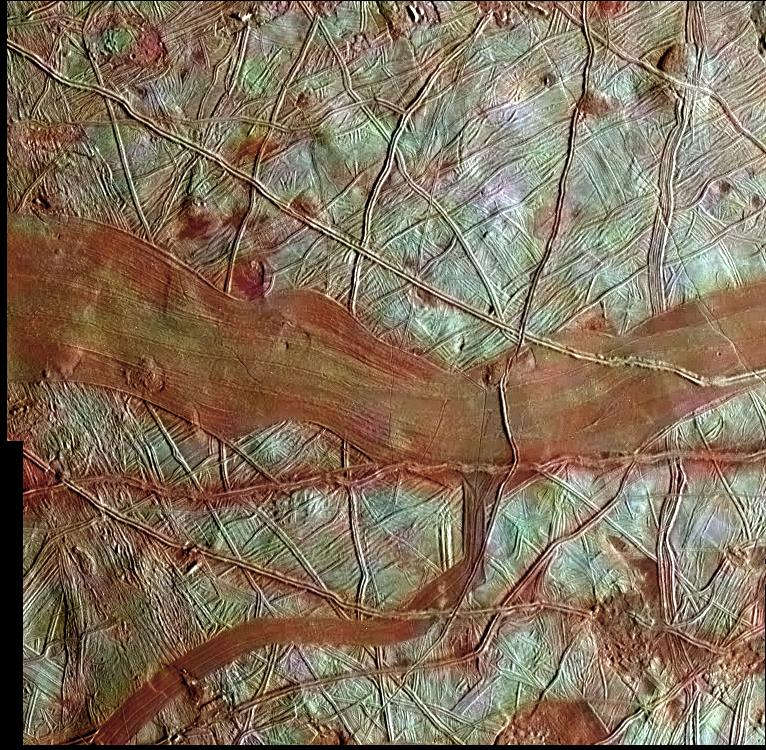
The Phaidra Linea region on Europa.

=== Ganymede ===
Ganymede has two principle geologic units termed “dark” terrain and “bright” terrain. Bright terrain is hypothesized to be younger because it has fewer craters than the dark terrain. The topography of bright terrain has many linear grooves in some regions, while it appears smooth in others. The appearance of smooth terrain may be an artifact of low resolution Voyager 2 imagery. Bright bands are hypothesized to form by tectonic spreading, possibly analogous to mid-ocean ridge spreading or terrestrial rift spreading. In some regions, dark terrain patches are found within light terrain. Parmentier et al. (1982) suggests that the light terrain material flooded into the dark terrain, leaving dark topographic highs as the observed dark patches surrounded by lower elevation light terrain. Parmentier et al. (1982) find that mid-ocean ridge-like spreading does not occur on Ganymede, citing observations of poorly matched crater remnants and poorly fitting polygonal terrain in regions split by rifts. Instead, offset features and evidence of flooding suggest finite lithospheric rifting produces the bright terrain. Parmentier et al. (1982) infer that the dark terrain is an ice-silicate mixture that is slightly more dense than pure water ice. Extension in the dark terrain causes less dense water-ice to extrude upwards, forming linear and curve rifts of bright terrain. Long, narrow grooves appear in both bright and dark terrains, but are more abundant in light terrain. Grooves are typically symmetrical, which suggests that they are extensional features, rather than compressional features like folds or thrust faults.

Head et al. (2002) reexamine possible formation mechanisms of bright and dark terrains on Ganymede using higher resolution Galileo mission imagery, with particular interest in whether the smooth areas described in Parmentier et al. (1982) are produced by cryovolcanic infilling. Many of the smooth regions observed in Voyager 2 imagery appear that way due to low image resolution. Instead, these “smooth” regions hold smaller linear ridges and troughs. The presence of smooth terrain was key to the cryovolcanic infilling hypothesis, and the presence of ridges and troughs within these regions poses a substantial challenge to that hypothesis. Galileo imagery reveals no lobate features or vents indicative of cryovolcanic flow. Furthermore, in regions with both bright and dark terrain, the bright terrain is topographically higher. These observations demand a tectonic deformation, possibly in addition to cryovolcanism, to explain bright regions.

Linear grooves and furrows thousands of kilometers in length form concentric arcs on Ganymede's surface. Rossi et al. (2018) undertook a detailed tectonic survey of Ganymede, using a combination of Voyager 2 and Galileo mission imagery, to inform an evolutionary tectonic model for the Uruk Sulcus region. Right lateral faulting produces sigmoidal structures in the shear zone, where extensional forces create linear grooves and furrows.

Abundant evidence of strike-slip faulting on Ganymede exists in both bright and dark terrain types. Such faulting may expose fresh, light ice within dark terrains. The fields of mapped faults may give evidence of how stress patterns shifted through time to produce the terrain.
