= En-zu (crater) =

Crater on Ganymede

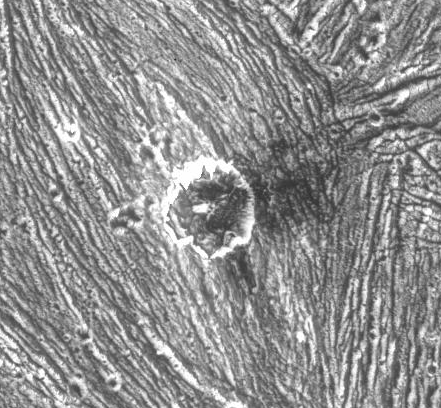
- A greyscale image of En-zu crater, taken by the Galileo space probe on 10 July 1996
- Feature type: Central Peak Dark Crater
- Coordinates: 11.59°N 168.40°W
- Diameter: 5 kilometres (3.1 mi)
- Eponym: Enzu

En-zu is a small crater located a few kilometers north of the equator of Ganymede, the largest moon of Jupiter. Its crater floor is covered with dark material, which is why it is classified as a "dark crater." It has a very small central peak, and the crater itself has a diameter of only approximately 5 kilometres (3.1 mi), making it the second-smallest named crater on Ganymede. Anat is the only named crater smaller than En-zu.

== Naming ==
The name En-zu is derived from the Akkadian name of the Babylonian god Sin.

Crater naming on Ganymede follows the International Astronomical Union's (IAU) convention of naming craters after deities, heroes, and places from Ancient Near Eastern mythologies. Enzu is a Mesopotamian god which is why the IAU approved the name for En-zu in 1997.

Two other craters on Ganymede, Sin and Nanna, are named after the same Babylonian deity as En-zu.

Another crater on Ganymede called Anzu has a name that is homonymous with En-zu.

== Geography and location ==
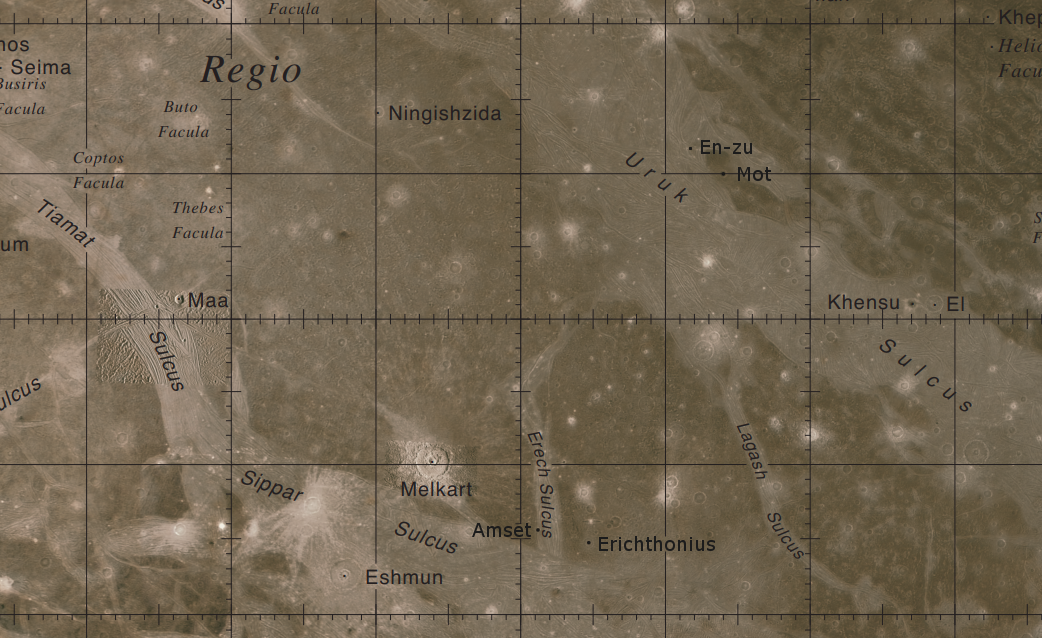
A map of the Uruk Sulcus quadrangle on Ganymede. En-zu is in the northeast of the quadrangle.

En-zu is located near Ganymede's equator, just a few kilometers to the north. It lies near the center of the smoother, grooved terrain known as Uruk Sulcus, where it is entirely surrounded by grooves.

To the southeast of En-zu is the crater Mot, while to the northwest lies the Epigeus impact basin, one of the largest well-defined impact craters on Ganymede. The area around En-zu is peppered with secondary impact craters that were likely formed during the Epigeus impact event.

En-zu is located within the Uruk Sulcus quadrangle (or section) of Ganymede (designated Jg8). Also, because Ganymede is in synchronous rotation as it orbits Jupiter, one hemisphere of the moon always faces the planet, while the opposite hemisphere never does. En-zu is located on the hemisphere that never faces Jupiter; therefore, an observer at the crater would never see Jupiter in the sky. (Note: For moons in synchronous rotation, such as Ganymede, 0° longitude corresponds to the part of the surface that always faces Jupiter. Regions between 90° W and 270° W longitude never face the moon's parent planet.)

Another prominent dark-floor crater within Uruk Sulcus is Khensu, which is located a few hundred kilometers to the southeast.

== Dark coloration ==
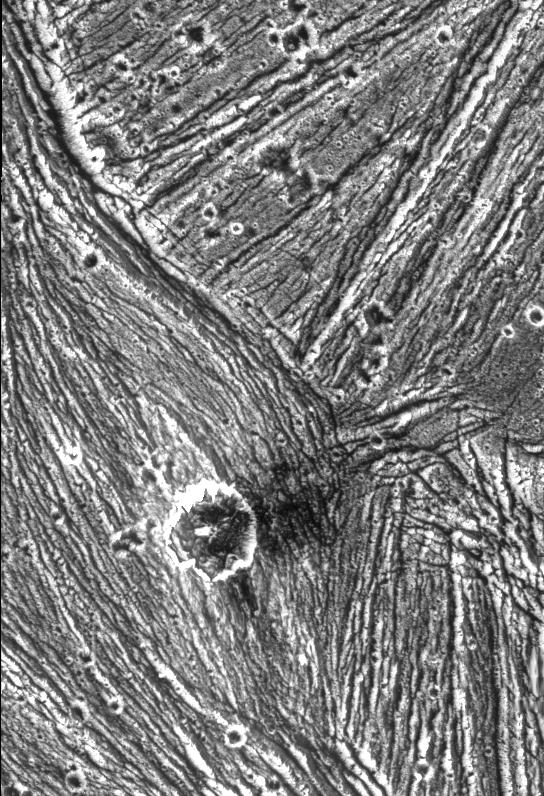
An image of En-zu within the grooved terrain of Uruk Sulcus. Its floor is filled with dark material.

En-zu's small size makes it relatively unremarkable. However, it is one of the rare craters on Ganymede that is classified as a "dark crater" or "dark-floor crater." This is because its crater floor appears to be covered by dark material, a feature rarely observed in other craters on the moon. The reason why some craters on Ganymede exhibit dark floors while others do not is not fully understood.

Studies have suggested that the natural deposition of dark material in low-lying areas elsewhere on Ganymede, such as the floors of troughs, valleys, and impact craters, may explain the dark appearance of En-zu crater.

According to studies of other dark craters, however, the dark material may instead have either originated from beneath Ganymede's surface after it has been excavated during the impact that formed the crater, or from the impactor itself, which contaminated the moon's surface.

Other examples of dark floor on Ganymede are Antum, Nergal and Kittu.

== Exploration ==
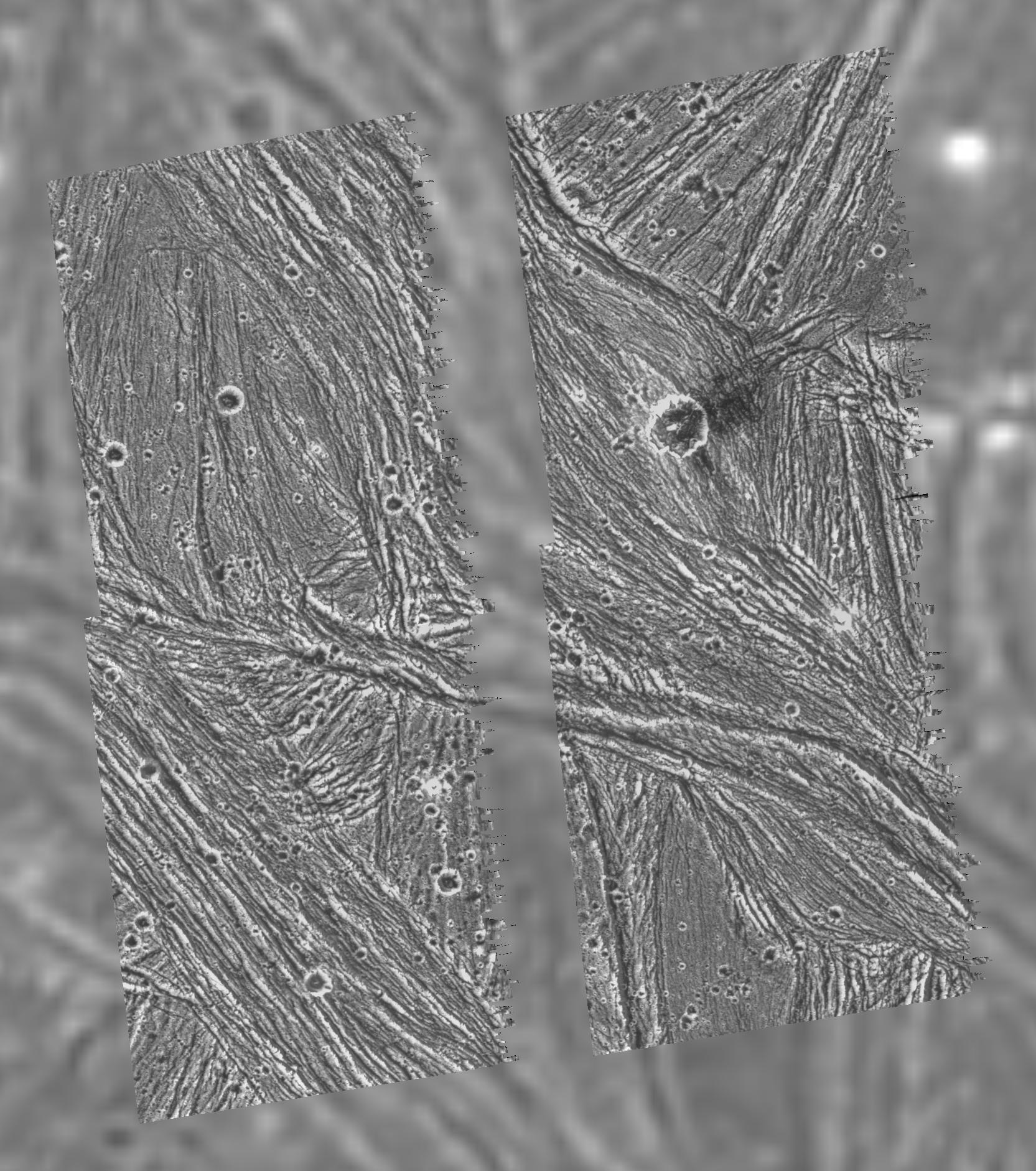
Two images of En-zu, with the higher-resolution image from Galileo superimposed on the lower-resolution image taken by Voyager 2.

Both Voyager 2 and the Galileo space probe took images of the area where En-zu is located.

Voyager 2 flew by Ganymede first in July 1979, when it captured low-resolution images of En-zu crater and its surroundings. Galileo later imaged En-zu and the surrounding region again in June and September 1996 during its G1 and G2 orbits around Jupiter. The resolution of Galileo's images of En-zu was as high as 40 metres (130 ft) per pixel.

Planetary scientists then combined and superimposed the newer, higher-resolution images taken by Galileo onto the older, less detailed images taken by Voyager decades earlier.

Although En-zu crater is extremely small and therefore difficult to observe clearly, Galileo fortuitously flew as low as 260 kilometres (160 mi) above Ganymede's surface when it passed near the crater, allowing the probe to image it in excellent details.

=== Future missions ===
The European Space Agency's (ESA) Jupiter Icy Moons Explorer (Juice) is on its way to the Jovian system. The probe is scheduled to arrive at Jupiter in July 2031 and its primary goal is to study the planet's icy moons. After orbiting around Jupiter and performing multiple flybys of the icy moons Europa, Callisto and Ganymede for approximately three and a half years, Juice will settle into a low polar orbit around Ganymede. Its close orbit around Ganymede could potentially allow planetary scientists to determine why En-zu's crater floor is so dark.

== See also ==
- Khensu - another dark floor crater near Ganymede's equator
- Nergal - a relatively young dark crater obscuring a younger groove terrain on Ganymede
- List of craters on Ganymede
- Meteor
