= Mir (crater) =

Crater on Ganymede

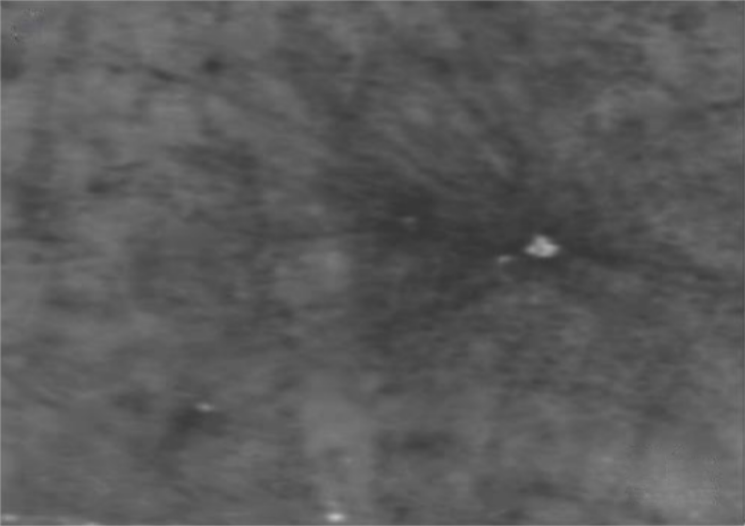
- An image of Mir, taken by Voyager 2 on 9 July 1979.
- Feature type: Dark ray Crater
- Coordinates: 3.30°S 230.30°W
- Diameter: 8 kilometres (5.0 mi)
- Depth: 0.7 kilometres (0.43 mi)
- Eponym: Mir

Mir is a small crater on Ganymede, the largest moon of planet Jupiter. Its diameter is only about 8 kilometres (5.0 mi). The floor of Mir crater is very bright, whereas its ray system is dark.

== Naming ==
Mir is named after a wind deity from Canaanite mythology. According to some older sources, Mir (or Mirmir) is the Chaldeo-Babylonian form of the name Hadad (Rimmon or Ramman), the supreme god of the wind and sky in Canaanite mythology.

The name Mir was approved by the International Astronomical Union (IAU) in accordance with the convention that craters on Ganymede are to be named after deities, heroes, or places from ancient Middle Eastern mythology, including Canaanite and Babylonian traditions. The IAU approved the name for Mir in 1985.

Another crater on Ganymede, Adad, is named after the same wind and storm deity as Mir.

== Location ==
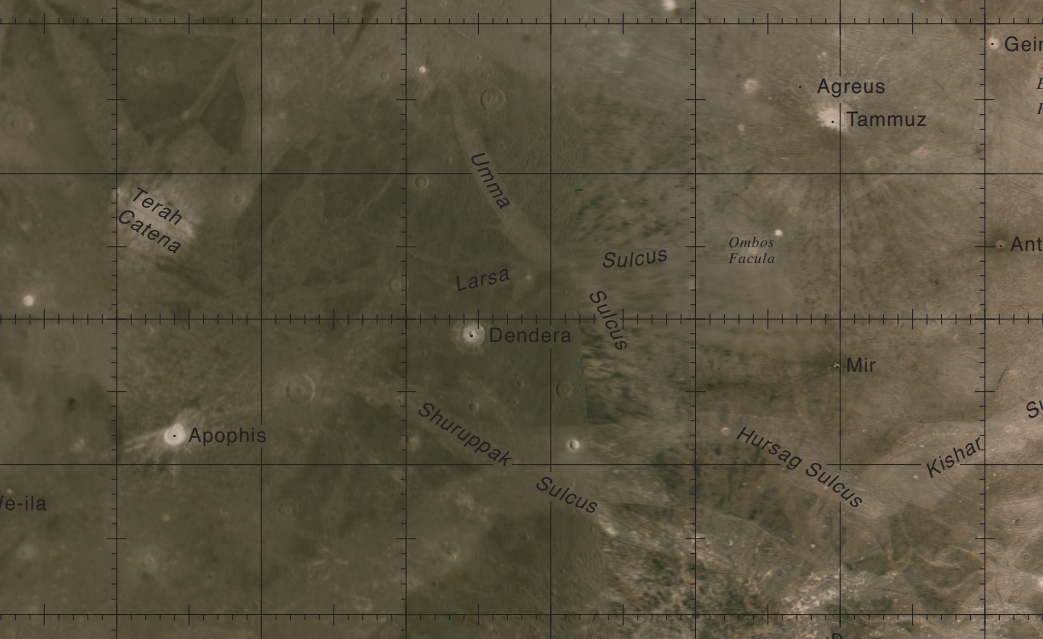
A map of the Tiamat Sulcus quadrangle of Ganymede, showing the location of Mir crater.

Mir crater is located near the center of a dark, rugged, and ancient region on Ganymede known as Melotte Regio. It is surrounded by several non-ray craters and intersected by younger, smoother grooved terrain.

To the northwest lies the crater Ombos, while to the northeast is another dark-ray crater, Antum. To the southeast lies the bright terrain Hursag Sulcus, and to the southwest is another bright terrain, Kishar Sulcus. Directly to the south is Lakhamu Fossa.

Mir is located within of the Tiamat Sulcus quadrangle (or section) of Ganymede (designated Jg9).

Mir is located on the hemisphere of Ganymede that always faces away from Jupiter. Because of the moon's synchronous rotation during its orbit, one hemisphere of Ganymede always faces Jupiter while the opposite hemisphere never does. Therefore, an observer at Mir would never see Jupiter in the sky.

== Morphology ==
Mir is a relatively small impact crater located within a very dark, ancient region on Ganymede. It has an estimated depth of approximately 0.7 kilometres (0.43 mi) and its crater floor is bright, in sharp contrast to its very dark ejecta, which form the ray system. Mir's dark rays are largely discontinuous and extend predominantly toward the west where they overlay a bright, unnamed sulcus. Spacecraft imagery shows that its rays extend as far as 160 kilometres (99 mi) from the crater.

In addition, studies suggest that two nearby unnamed craters, one of which is superimposed on Mir's dark rays, may have contributed to the dark ejecta. Due to the lack of high-resolution imagery, it remains uncertain whether the crater possesses a central peak or pit.

Other examples of dark ray craters on Ganymede include Antum, Kittu and Khesnu.

== Formation ==
Mir crater is a dark-ray crater formed on dark terrain but characterized by a bright interior, indicating excavation of materials through a stratified subsurface. Models suggest that Mir impacted a surface layer of dark ice overlying a brighter, ice-rich layer. During crater formation, excavation of the dark upper layer produced non-ice–dominated dark ejecta, while uplift of deeper bright ice during the modification stage resulted in a bright crater floor. The maximum excavation depth of Mir is estimated at approximately 0.7 kilometres (0.43 mi), implying a similar thickness for the overlying dark layer.

Mir demonstrates that small craters on dark terrain produce dark floors and rays primarily from the local surface material and do not penetrate to the brighter subsurface ice layers. This contrasts with larger craters, which excavate more deeply and can expose bright ice. Additionally, measurements of the excavation depth of dark-ray craters such as Mir indicate that the thickness of the dark terrain does not exceed 1 kilometre (0.62 mi).

== Spectroscopy ==
Voyager 2 spectroscopy indicates that the floor of Mir crater is rich in water ice, whereas its rays are more heavily contaminated with non-ice material. In terms of ice grain size, the crater interior exhibits larger grains, with an average size of approximately 2 millimetres (0.079 in), while ice grains along the west–east axis of the rays and in the central part of the crater have a smaller average size of about 1 millimetre (0.039 in).

Spectroscopic observations indicate that certain dark-ray craters on Ganymede's trailing hemisphere, including Mir, consist of three distinct materials rather than two: water ice, hydrated non-ice material likely derived from Ganymede's interior, and an additional less-hydrated, reddish non-ice component. The last component is either from a primitive impactor origin or the excavation of primordial material from Ganymede itself. This carbonaceous component is estimated to comprise approximately 40–50% of the ejecta, assuming discrete mixing. While absent in icy terrain, it is often found in other regiones not associated with dark-ray craters, with abundances ranging from 0 to about 50%. Its occurrence in older, primordial terrain supports the interpretation that the material is endogenous to Ganymede. Consequently, excavation of subsurface material at Mir appears sufficient to account for the observed characteristics of its dark-ray ejecta. Additional spectral imaging is needed to confirm these findings.

Compared to other dark ray craters like Kittu, observations of Mir crater indicate that the proportion of carbonaceous material in its ejecta is slightly different from a 50:50 mix, being close to—but not exactly—equal.

== Exploration ==
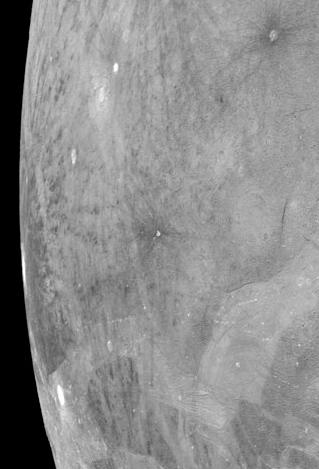
An image of Ganymede's limb, with Mir at the center, taken by Voyager 2 in July 1979. The other dark ray crater on the upper right is Antum.

Voyager 2 was the first spacecraft to image Mir when it flew by the side of Ganymede that never faces Jupiter in July 1979. The probe successfully returned clear images of both the crater and it dark surrounding regions. As of 2026, Voyager 2's medium-resolution images of the crater remains the only clear image of Mir to date.

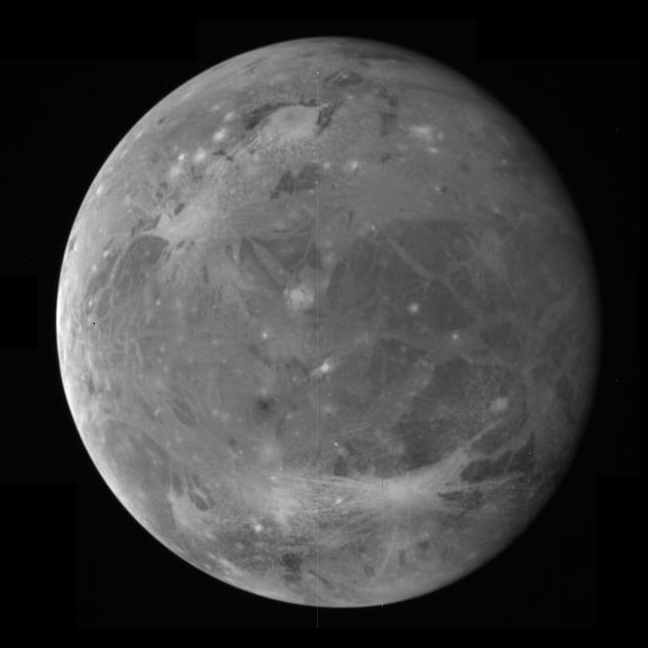
An image of Melotte Regio showing Mir on the upper right, taken by the Galileo space probe in May 1999. Mir is barely visible in this image.

The next probe to view Mir was Galileo, which happened during its flyby of Ganymede in May 1999. However, the spacecraft did not fly close to Mir or Melotte Regio, which is why it was only able to image the crater in low resolution.

=== Future Missions ===
The European Space Agency's (ESA) space probe called the Jupiter Icy Moons Explorer (Juice) is scheduled to arrive at Jupiter in July 2031. In 2034, Juice is will settle into a low orbit around Ganymede at a distance of just 500 kilometres (310 mi) in July 2034. The Juice mission is expected to obtain the first close-up images of Mir crater, which may provide insights into the formation of dark ray craters and the composition of Ganymede's interior.

== See also ==
- List of craters on Ganymede
- Meteor
