= Tammuz (crater) =

Crater on Ganymede

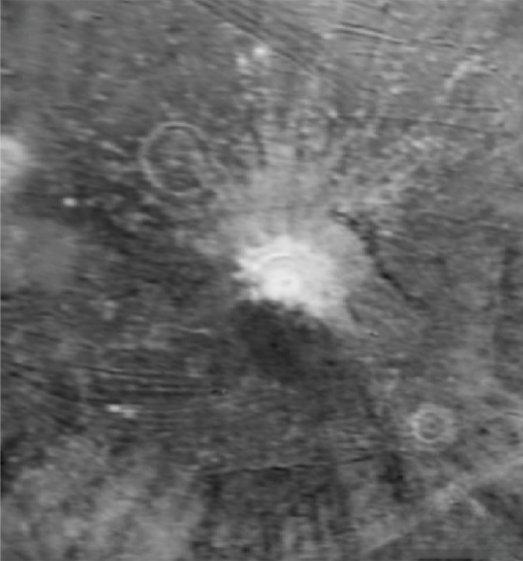
- An image of Tammuz crater, taken by Voyager 2 on 9 July 1979. The crater to the northwest is Agreus.
- Feature type: Hybrid Bright and Dark ray Crater
- Coordinates: 13.45°N 230.76°W
- Diameter: 51 kilometres (32 mi)
- Eponym: Tammuz

Tammuz is a crater on Ganymede, the largest moon of planet Jupiter. At about 51 kilometres (32 mi) in diameter, the crater is a very rare type because it has both bright rays and dark rays.

== Naming ==
Tammuz is named after an important Sumero-Babylonian god called Tammuz (or Dumuzid). He was the husband of Inanna (later called Ishtar). Tammuz was the god of vegetation and animal herding, as well as the seasonal cycle of crop growth. After Inanna was trapped in the Underworld and later rescued, she learned that her husband Tammuz had not mourned her absence. As a result, she commanded the demons of the Underworld to take Tammuz as her replacement, where he was required to remain for part of each year. As the god whose presence makes crops and vegetations grow, Tammuz's descent to the Underworld marked the beginning of a recurring period of winter, when crops would no longer grow until the next spring.

Tammuz's naming follows the convention that was set by the International Astronomical Union (IAU), which states that craters on Ganymede should be named after deities, heroes, or places from Ancient Middle Eastern mythology, including Sumerian and Babylonian mythologies.

The IAU approved Tammuz's name in 1985.

== Location ==
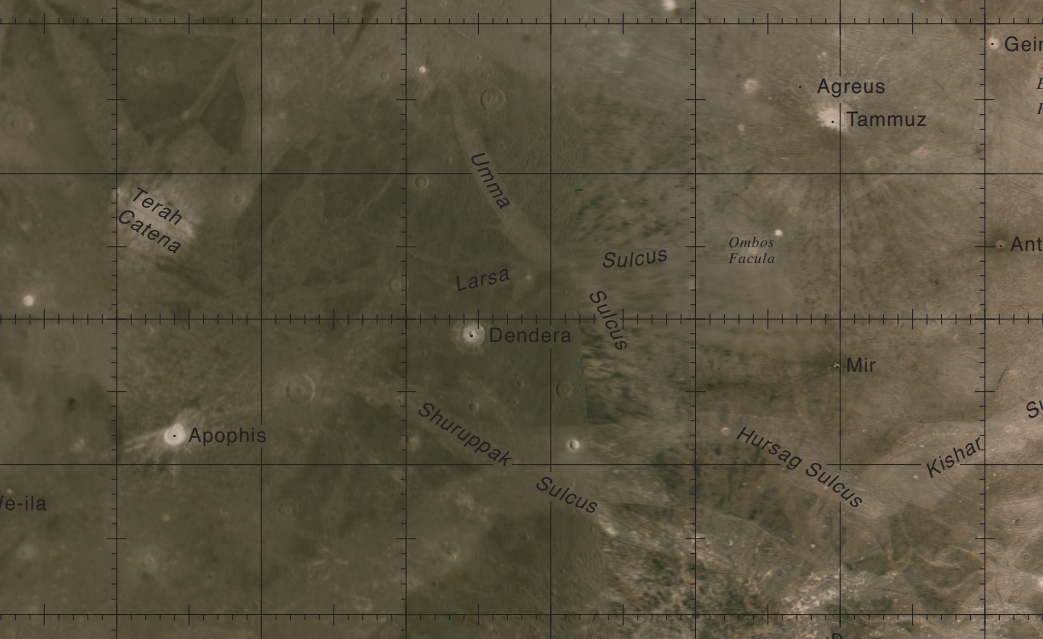
A map of the Tiamat Sulcus quadrangle of Ganymede. Tammuz crater is visible in the upper-right portion of the map.

Tammuz is situated in the northern part of a dark, ancient regio on Ganymede called Melotte Regio. It is located almost exactly at the boundary between the dark area of Melotte Regio and the northwestern terminus of a bright terrain called Tiamat Sulcus.

Right beside Tammuz, to the northwest, is the crater Agreus, while to the southwest is the crater Ombos. To the southeast lie the dark-ray crater Antum and Tiamat Sulcus, while to the northeast are Busiris Facula, the crater Geinos, and the dark region known as Marius Regio.

Tammuz is located in the northeast corner of the Tiamat Sulcus quadrangle (i.e. section) of Ganymede (designated Jg9).

Tammuz crater is located on the hemisphere of Ganymede that always faces away from Jupiter. Because of the moon's synchronous rotation during its orbit, one hemisphere of Ganymede permanently faces the planet while the opposite hemisphere never does. Therefore, an observer at Tammuz would always never see Jupiter in the sky.

== Morphology ==
Tammuz is a ray crater that has both bright rays and dark rays. One-half of Tammuz crater displays a bright ray system extending to the northeast, while the other half features a dark ray extending toward the southwest in the opposite direction. The radial extent of Tammuz crater's dark and bright ray ejecta is comparable to that of other bright-ray craters. However, the limited image resolution of the crater makes it difficult to accurately constrain the location of the dual-colored ejecta. Nonetheless, NIMS observations clearly document albedo variations associated with differing abundances of water ice and dark non-ice material in both the ejecta and the crater. Ultimately, higher-resolution imaging will be necessary to fully constrain the crater's exact setting, ejecta pattern, and broader geologic context.

Studies suggest that the excavation depth of Tammuz is around 3.6 kilometres (2.2 mi). In terms of the ratio between excavation depth and crater diameter, Tammuz crater is of intermediate scale.

The asymmetric distribution of bright and dark ejecta at Tammuz crater suggests that the impact occurred in a geologically heterogeneous target. The crater may have formed near the boundary between a substantial expanse of bright terrain—possibly an unresolved portion of Tiamat Sulcus—and a smaller, highly disrupted area of dark terrain associated with Marius Regio.

There is an ongoing debate as to whether or not Tammuz should be classified as a dark ray crater.

== Formation ==
It remains uncertain whether Tammuz formed within the dark terrain of Marius Regio or the brighter terrain of Tiamat Sulcus, which traverses the region north of the crater from southeast to northwest. It is possible that a remnant of dark terrain related to Marius Regio extends to the southern rim of Tammuz but is obscured by the crater's dark ejecta. This interpretation is consistent with the global geologic map of Ganymede by Collins et al. that was published in 2013, which supports a heterogeneous target area composed predominantly of bright, ice-rich material in the northeastern half and darker ice-rich material in the southwestern half.

With an estimated excavation depth of approximately 3.6 kilometres (2.2 mi) as mentioned above, Tammuz likely penetrated more deeply into the bright, ice-rich layer than nearby craters such as Antum and Mir.

== Composition of Rays ==
The dark ray materials are probably made of hydrate materials. The composition of the dark ejecta associated with the crater Tammuz can be well explained by Ganymedean hydrate. Spectral models show that the non-ice material in Tammuz's dark ejecta closely matches the spectral signature of Ganymede hydrate, with no significant mismatch between the model and the observed data.

In addition, the dark ejecta of Tammuz crater are compositionally distinctive in that their spectral signature is fully consistent with pure Ganymede hydrate. Unlike many other low-albedo regions on Ganymede, where the observed 2‑μm and 3‑μm hydration bands exceed modeled values, Tammuz's dark material matches the canonical hydrate at all wavelengths. This indicates that the dark ejecta do not require additional hydration or an anomalously hydrated carbonaceous component to explain their spectral characteristics. The match is robust and not attributable to observational effects, such as photometry or phase angle variations. As such, Tammuz provides a clear example of dark ejecta derived from indigenous hydrated non-ice material excavated by an impact. It is plausible that the dark-ray craters on bright terrain are largely made of hydrates, which can exist near the surface in tectonically modified regions.

The low-albedo material associated with Tammuz crater is well modeled by canonical Ganymede hydrate across all wavelengths, with only minor discrepancies in the 1–1.3 μm range likely attributable to calibration errors. The hydrate in Tammuz is relatively desiccated compared with other non-dark-ray-crater terrains, suggesting that impact processes may reduce the water content of surface hydrate. This observation implies that the hydration state of non-ice material associated with, or adjacent to, impact sites could potentially serve as a relative indicator of impact age.

In conclusion, the dark rays of Tammuz crater contain no exogenous material and consist entirely of subsurface hydrate. This demonstrates that at least some dark ray craters can form through the excavation of darker subsurface material and its emplacement onto brighter, icier terrain, suggesting this process may contribute to the formation of dark ray craters more generally.

== Exploration ==
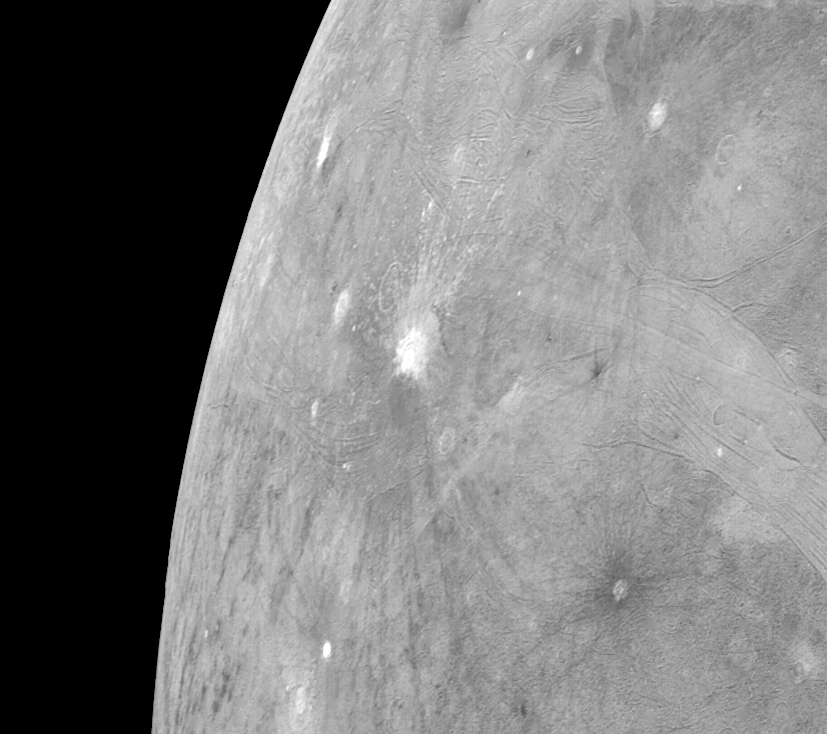
An image of Ganymede, centered at Tammuz crater, taken by Voyager 2 in July 1979. The dark ray crater to the lower right is Antum.

Voyager 2 became the first spacecraft to image Tammuz when it flew by Ganymede in July 1979. During its quick visit, the crater appeared as a bright feature with dark rays in its images.

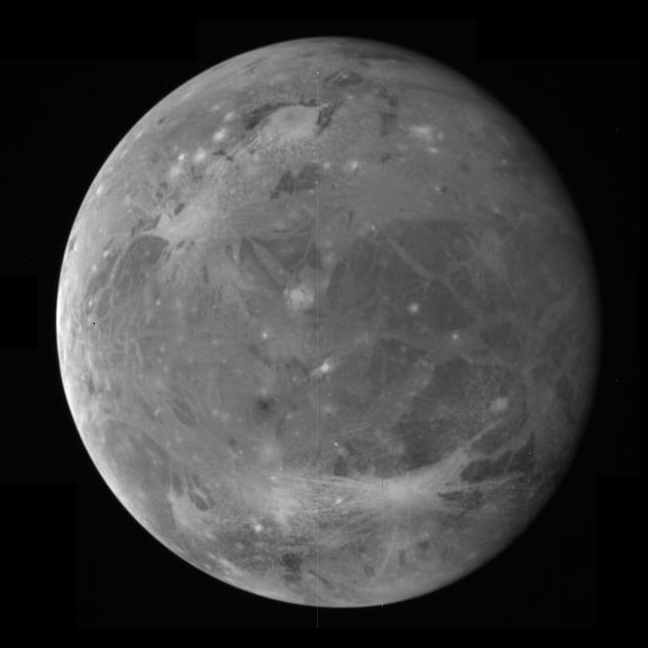
An image of Melotte Regio showing Tammuz on the upper right, taken by the Galileo space probe in May 1999.

Galileo became the next probe to visit Tammuz during its flyby of Ganymede in May 1999. However, the spacecraft did not fly close to Tammuz which is why it was only able to image the crater in medium resolution.

As of 2026, no high-resolution images of Tammuz crater exist; only medium-resolution data are available.

=== Future Missions ===
The European Space Agency's (ESA) space probe called the Jupiter Icy Moons Explorer (Juice) is scheduled to arrive at Jupiter in July 2031.

In 2034, Juice is will settle into a low orbit around Ganymede at a distance of just 500 kilometres (310 mi) in July 2034. Juice is expected to send the first-ever close-up images of Tammuz crater.

== See also ==
- List of craters on Ganymede
- Meteor
