= Antum (crater) =

Crater on Ganymede

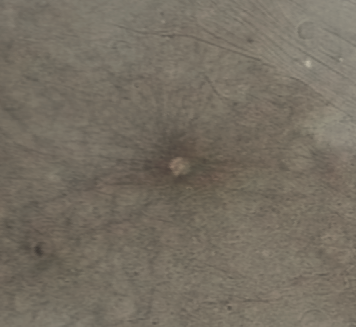
- A narrow-angle image of Antum crater, taken by Voyager 2 on 9 July 1979.
- Feature type: Dark-ray Crater
- Coordinates: 5.09°N 218.94°W
- Diameter: 14.75 kilometres (9.17 mi)
- Depth: 1.2 kilometres (0.75 mi)
- Eponym: Antum

Antum is a crater on the surface of Ganymede, the largest moon of Jupiter. It is a small crater with a diameter of only about 14.75 kilometres (9.17 mi) and a depth of 1.2 kilometres (0.75 mi). The crater exhibits dark rays of ejecta around itself, which is considered rare on Ganymede.

== Naming ==
Antum is named after the Mesopotamian goddess Antum (or Antu), the wife of the supreme god of the sky Anu and the great mother goddess who gave birth to many of the primary gods and goddesses in Sumerian and Babylonian mythologies. The name follows the convention established by the International Astronomical Union (IAU), which stipulates that craters on Ganymede should be named after deities, heroes, or places from Ancient Middle Eastern mythology, including Sumerian and Babylonian traditions.

The IAU approved the name for Antum in 1985.

== Location ==
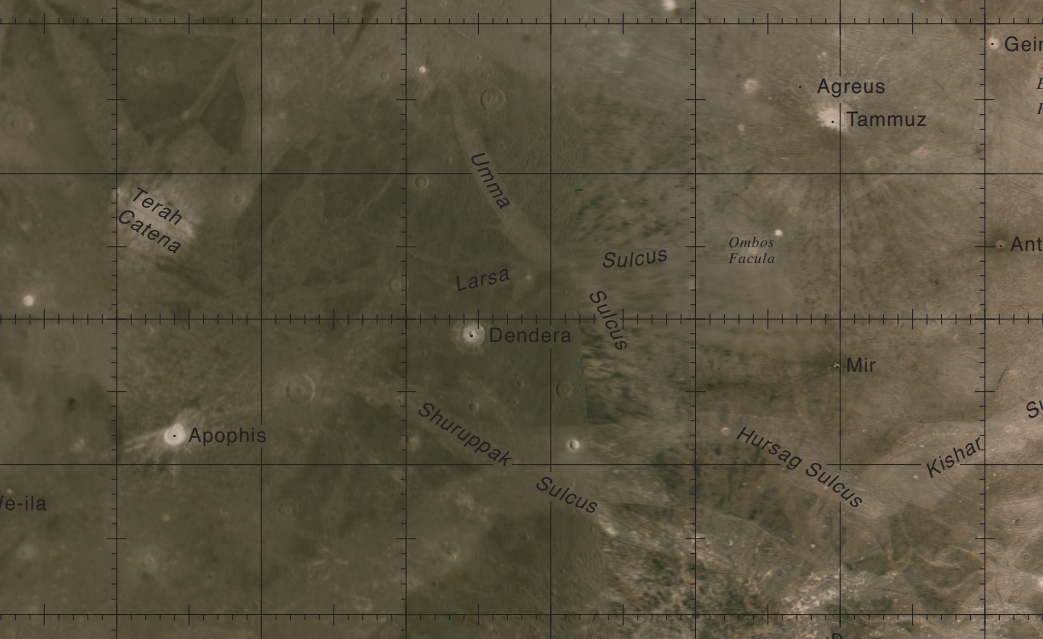
A map of the Tiamat Sulcus quadrangle of Ganymede, showing the location of Antum crater on the right edge of the map.

Antum is located entirely within a dark, ancient region on Ganymede known as Melotte Regio. It is situated in the regio's northeastern corner, near the boundary between Melotte Regio and Tiamat Sulcus. It lies near the junction where Tiamat Sulcus and Kishar Sulcus meet. To the northwest of Antum lies the crater Tammuz, to the west is Ombos, and to the southwest is another dark-ray crater, Mir.

Antum is within the eastern end of the Tiamat Sulcus quadrangle of Ganymede (designated Jg9).

Antum is located on the hemisphere of Ganymede that never faces Jupiter. This is a result of the moon's synchronous rotation as it orbits its parent planet. Therefore, an observer at Antum crater will never see Jupiter in the sky.

== Morphology ==
Because of its dark rays and ejecta, Antum is classified as a dark ray crater. Dark ray craters are fairly rare and are concentrated in one area of Ganymede's surface.

Antum is considered very important in the study of craters on Ganymede because it has a well-defined rim with extended dark rays radiating outward. Its crater rays seem to be composed entirely of dark material, with no indication of the presence of bright material. This morphology strongly suggests that all of the material excavated by the asteroid or comet that created the crater is compositionally uniform.

To explain craters like Antum, the depth of excavation for dark ejecta should match the thickness of the top dark terrain material. Because the impactor that formed Antum excavated to a depth of approximately 1.2 kilometres (0.75 mi) and all of the ejecta material is uniformly dark, planetary scientists infer that the dark terrain at this location on Ganymede is at least about a kilometer thick, indicating that it is not merely a superficial coating. Other studies, however, (specially older ones) suggest that dark ejectas on Ganymede are composed of material from the body that impacted Ganymede and created the crater, rather than material excavated from beneath the moon's surface.

Combined morphological, spectral, and modeling results indicate that Antum is a geologically young and compositionally distinctive dark ray crater whose formation excavated and redistributed large quantities of dark terrain material. Other examples of dark ray craters on Ganymede include Kittu and Nergal.

== Formation ==
Numerical simulations indicate that Antum formed from a hypervelocity impact into a low-cohesion, porous upper layer of ice-rich material, fundamentally controlling the crater's shallow profile, lack of a central peak, and the texture of its ejecta. This porous layer, likely extending several kilometers deep, explains both the fragmentation observed in the dark ejecta and the crater's classification as transitional between complex and anomalous crater types (the ancient crater Neith is an example of an anomalous dome crater on Ganymede). Rather than excavating a dense, rigid substrate, the impact primarily disrupted a crumbly surface layer, producing fine-grained, dark material consistent with many spectral observations.

Geological mapping further reveals that Antum's ejecta distribution is strongly asymmetric, pointing to an oblique impact from the southeast toward the northwest. This asymmetry is mirrored in the spatial distribution of non-ice contaminants detected spectrally, indicating that the impact redistributed pre-existing surface material rather than generating new dark phases. The porous upper layer appears to have acted as a volatile reservoir, trapping compounds such as carbon dioxide and hydrated salt beneath the surface until excavation exposed them. As a result, Antum displays a distinct compositional difference: the crater interior contains relatively pure, coarse-grained ice, while the surrounding ejecta blanket consists primarily of fine-grained material mixed with surface contaminants.

== Characteristic ==
Spectral analyses of the crater floor and ejecta highlight the importance of subsurface shielding and post-impact processing. The crater floor has exposed ice with strong water absorption bands of 1.5–2.0 μm with minimal contamination, which is interpreted as older but pristine water ice that was likely protected from radiolytic alteration by being buried under Ganymede's surface and by the moon's intrinsic magnetic field. In contrast, the ejecta exhibit weaker ice bands, redder spectral shifts, and hydrated salt signatures, reflecting mixing with surface-derived materials and possibly impact-mobilized brines. Evidence for hydrohalite and other salts suggests that transient heating during impact may have briefly mobilized saline fluids within the porous layer, while the detection of complexed carbon dioxide and sulfuric acid indicates interaction with a surface already modified by Jupiter's radiation environment.

Antum is one of the least dark dark ray craters on Ganymede. Spectroscopic analyses of its dark rays reveal a reflectance of approximately 20% in the near-infrared spectrum, which is significantly higher than that of other dark ray craters, such as Kittu, which has a reflectance of only 6%. Unlike for Kittu, there is no relationship between water ice abundance and CO2 abundance. Observations of Antum indicate that its rays are composed of an approximately 50/50 mixture of carbonaceous materials and hydrates, and that the dark material associated with the dark ray crater contains roughly equal proportions of impactor material.

These results are not exclusive to dark-ray craters, as similar materials and proportions are also found across Ganymede's dark regions unrelated to dark-ray craters. The carbonaceous material observed on Ganymede's surface, including within dark-ray craters, may also result from the long-term accumulation of impactor debris, thereby complicating efforts to distinguish between impactor contamination and the excavation of indigenous Ganymede material. Additional data from future missions will be required to confidently determine the origin of these dark materials.

The origin of the dark material in Antum's ejecta remains an important interpretive point. While minor contributions from the impactor cannot be excluded, spectral modeling favors a predominantly endogenous source, with dark material representing redistributed dark terrain material rather than exogenic debris (i.e. dark material from the impactor). The persistence of hydrated spectral features constrains any carbonaceous contribution to a relatively small fraction, supporting the view that Antum excavated and redistributed material already present in the ancient dark terrain of Marius Regio. In this sense, Antum functions as a geological window and a natural excavation site on Ganymede, revealing both the physical structure and chemical composition of the upper crust.

== Relevance to future studies and explorations ==
Studies of Antum have positioned it as a valuable analogue for impact processes on other icy ocean worlds. The inferred two-layer structure—a porous upper layer overlying denser ice—and the observed excavation and mobilization of subsurface material are consistent with similar models proposed for Europa and Enceladus. The presence of salts and possible ammoniated compounds raises astrobiological questions about whether impacts can transiently create chemically favorable environments by mobilizing brines and reactive species. The existence of Antum underscores the need to view impacts not merely as destructive events, but as potential enablers of chemical complexity and as a way to sample material from underneath an icy body's crust.

== Exploration ==
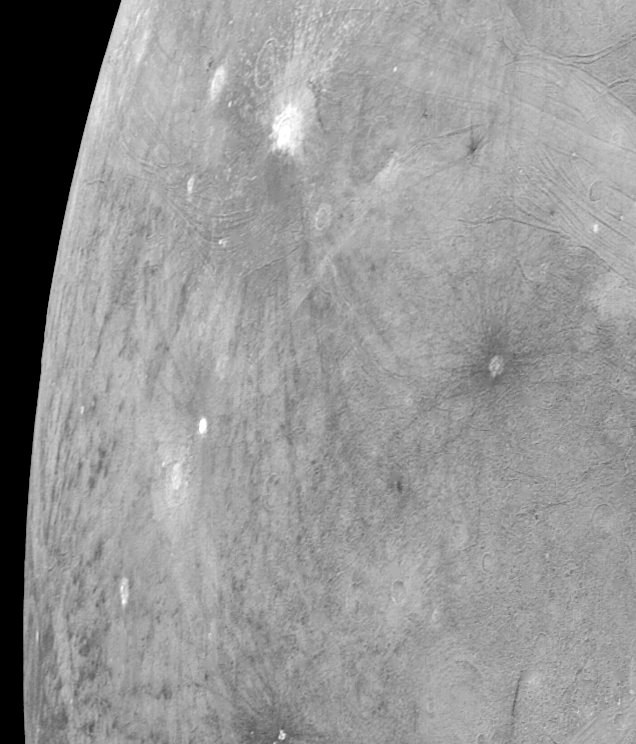
A mosaic image of Ganymede, showing Antum crater (right), taken by Voyager 2 in July 1979. The bright crater at the top is Tammuz

As of 2026, two probes have viewed and photographed Antum crater. Voyager 2 photographed Antum crater during its flyby of Ganymede in July 1979.

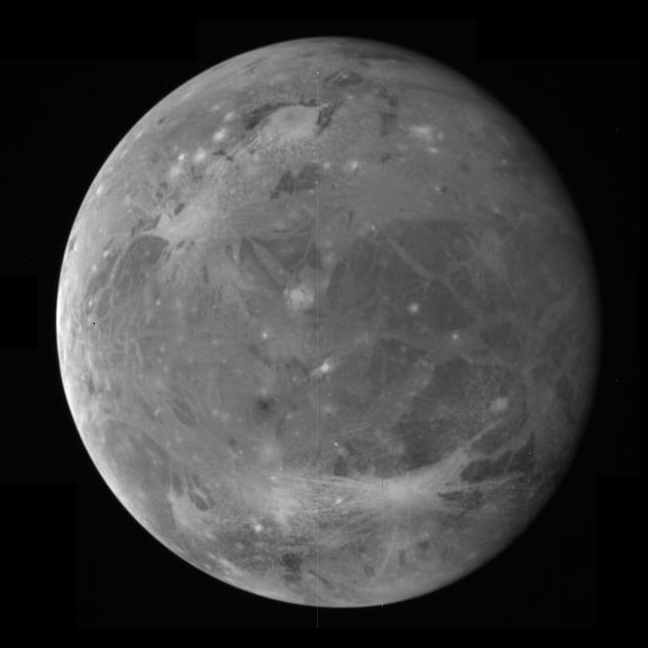
An distant image of Melotte Regio showing Antum (the right side of Ganymede, near the terminator), taken by the Galileo space probe in May 1999.

Similarly, Galileo was able to observe and image Antum as it orbited Jupiter from December 1995 to September 2003. During one of its flybys, it captured images of Antum at resolutions ranging from 2 kilometres (1.2 mi) per pixel, which is comparable to Voyager 2's images, to 359 metres (1,178 ft) per pixels.

=== Future mission ===
The European Space Agency's (ESA) Jupiter Icy Moons Explorer (Juice) is scheduled to arrive at Jupiter in July 2031. Juice is expected to settle into a low orbit around Ganymede at a distance of just 500 kilometres (310 mi) in July 2034. Because Antum crater was the subject of several studies in 2024–2025 due to its potential as a natural excavation site into Ganymede's upper crust, Juice is expected to specifically target Antum as a top-priority observation.

== See also ==
- List of craters on Ganymede
- Meteor
