= Kittu (disambiguation) =

- Kittu, a 2006 traditionally animated Indian feature film
- Kittu (crater), crater on Ganymede
- Kittu (Tamil militant) (1960–1993), nom de guerre of Sri Lankan Tamil rebel Sathasivam Krishnakumar
- Maaveeran Kittu, 2016 Indian drama film
- Kittu or Kittum, a Mesopotamian goddess
- Jagannath Krishnaswamy (1932–1981), Indian footballer who was known mononymously as "Kittu"
