= Nergal (crater) =

Crater on Ganymede

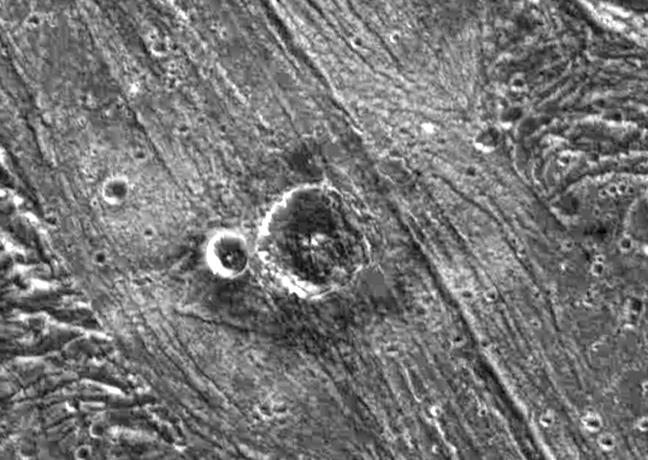
- An image of Nergal taken by the Galileo space probe on 24 November 1997.
- Feature type: Dark-ray Crater
- Coordinates: 38.6°N 200.3°W
- Diameter: 9.6 kilometres (6.0 mi)
- Eponym: Nergal

Nergal is a small, dark-ray crater on Ganymede, the largest moon of Jupiter.

== Naming ==
The crater is named after Nergal, the Sumerian god of war, death, plagues, famine and diseases. He was also highly regarded by the Mesopotamians as the king of the underworld, alongside his co-ruler and queen Ereshkigal. The International Astronomical Union (IAU) ruled that surface features and craters on Ganymede should be named after deities, heroes and places from Ancient Middle Eastern mythologies, of which Sumerian mythology is a part of. Nergal's name was approved by the IAU in 1997.

== Location and Characteristics ==
Nergal is a small, 9.6 kilometres (6.0 mi) crater located entirely within a bright surface feature on Ganymede called Byblus Sulcus, which, in turn, is within a dark region called Marius Regio. To its east is another sulcus called Akitu Sulcus.

Nergal is located within the Philus quadrangle (designated Jg4) of Ganymede.

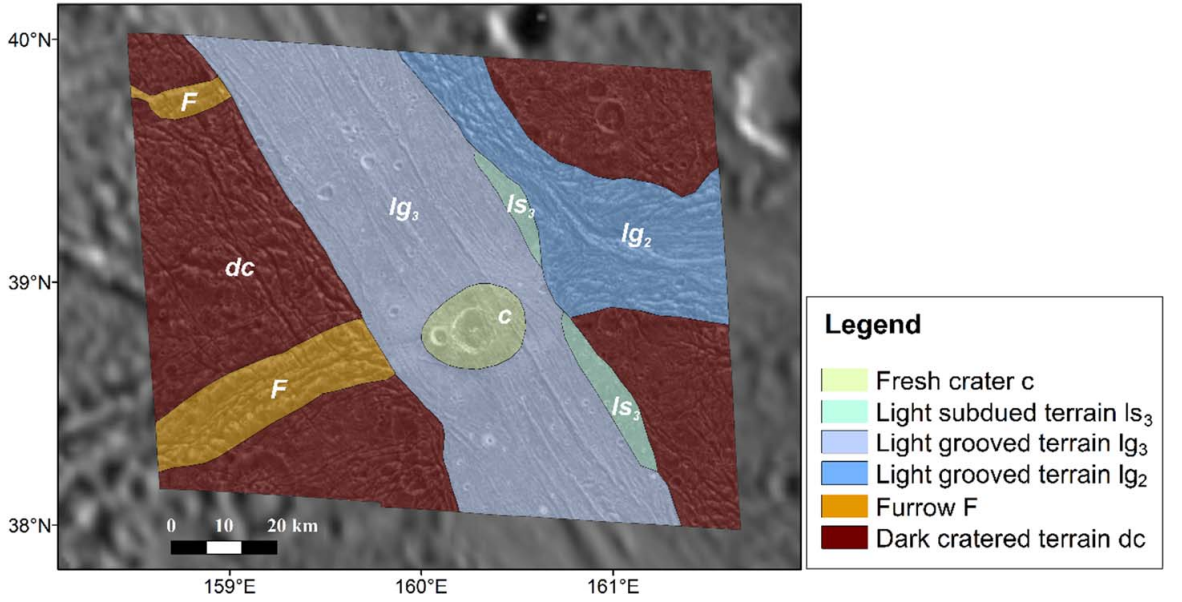
A color-coded stratigraphy map of the Nergal crater (area C). Older terrain is marked with a dark red color while the youngest ones are in pale lime (represented by the youthful Nergal crater).

Nergal is considered as the youngest feature within the sulcus and its vicinity. It has a satellite crater right beside it to its west, suggesting that it is a double impact crater that was formed when an asteroid or comet fragmented into two before crashing into the same area simultaneously, similar to how the comet Shoemaker-Levy 9 broke apart due to Jupiter's immense gravity before colliding with the planet.

Nergal is surrounded by a distinctive ejecta blanket that appears darker close to the crater and becomes brighter with distance. For this reason, it is considered in some research as a "dark-ray crater"—one of the smallest of its kind on Ganymede. The inner portion of this ejecta has a lobate, flow-like morphology, suggesting that a liquid or slushy material once moved across the surface. This flow was likely produced when the impact released enough energy to melt icy surface material. By the geological law of superposition, the ancient, dark regions of Marius Regio formed first. Afterward, Byblus Sulcus formed as tectonic activity disturbed the surface, erasing the dark terrain and replacing it with a newer, brighter surface produced by fresh water ice upwelling from beneath Ganymede's surface. Nergal formed later as a result of an impact, since it appears to be superimposed on Byblus Sulcus.

According to research, compared to other similar craters, Nergal's dark-rays are not very extensive with respect to the size of the crater itself.

Other examples of dark-ray craters on the moon are Antum, Khensu and Kittu. Dark-ray craters are considered rare on Ganymede.

== Exploration ==
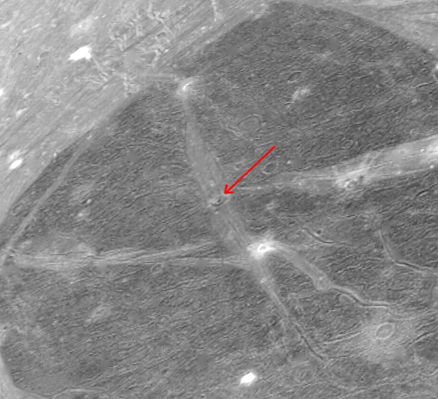
A highly zoomed-in, mosaic of northern Marius Regio showing Nergal crater (marked by a red arrow), as imaged by Voyager 2 in July 1979.

Voyager 2 and the Galileo space probe are the only missions that have observed and photographed Nergal.

The crater is very small, however, which makes it difficult to image with enough resolution. Because the crater was so tiny, Voyager 2 was not able to obtain any clear images of Nergal during its brief flyby of Jupiter and Ganymede in July 1979

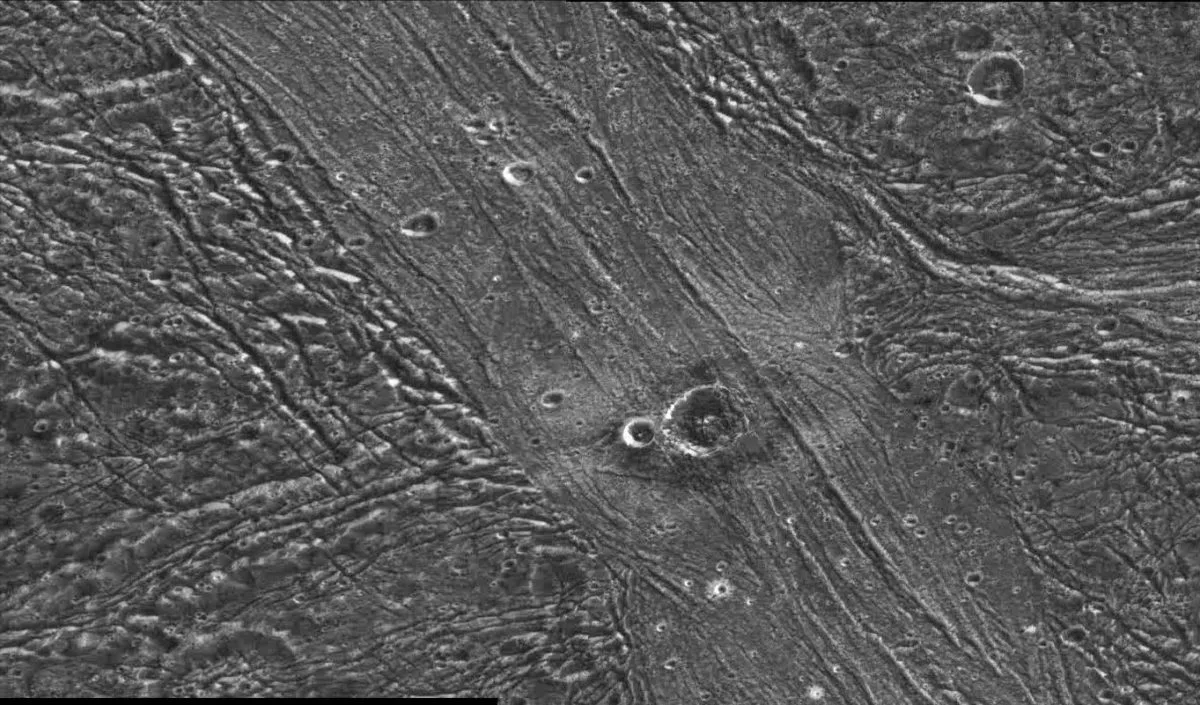
An image of Nergal within the grooved terrain of Byblus Sulcus (running diagonally from the upper right to the lower right), as imaged by the Galileo probe in September 1996. The older, more heavily-cratered and more rugged Marius Regio surrounds the crater and its host sulcus.

Galileo was able to fly pass Nergal at a very close distance during its orbit around Jupiter from December 1995 to September 2003. Its imaging system was able to see details as small as 86 metres (282 ft). As of 2025, Galileo's images are the only available clear images of Nergal.

== See also ==
- En-zu - another dark floor crater on Ganymede
- Khensu a dark floor crater near Ganymede's equator
- List of craters on Ganymede
- Meteor
