= El (crater) =

Crater on Ganymede

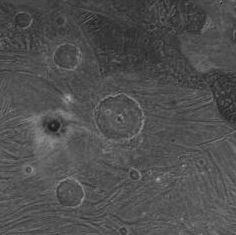
- An image of El (center), along with another dark crater named Khensu to the west, taken by Voyager 2 on July 9, 1979.
- Feature type: Multi-ringed, pit crater
- Coordinates: 1.01°N 151.36°W
- Diameter: 55 kilometres (34 mi)
- Eponym: El

El is a crater on Ganymede. It has a small "pit" in its center. Craters with such a "central pit" are common across Ganymede and are especially intriguing since they may reveal secrets about the structure of the satellite's shallow subsurface.

== Naming ==
El is the supreme deity and “father of all gods and goddesses” in many Middle Eastern mythologies, including Canaanite, Ugaritic, Hittite, and Hebrew mythologies, among others. His name, “El,” is also the generic term for “god” or “deity” in many Semitic and Anatolian languages, though its pronunciation and rendering vary across cultures. El assumed several different roles in mythology, ranging from a storm god to a sky god.

The International Astronomical Union (IAU) chose this name in line with the theme that craters on Ganymede be named after deities, figures and places from Ancient Middle Eastern mythologies. The name was approved by the IAU in 1997.

== Location ==
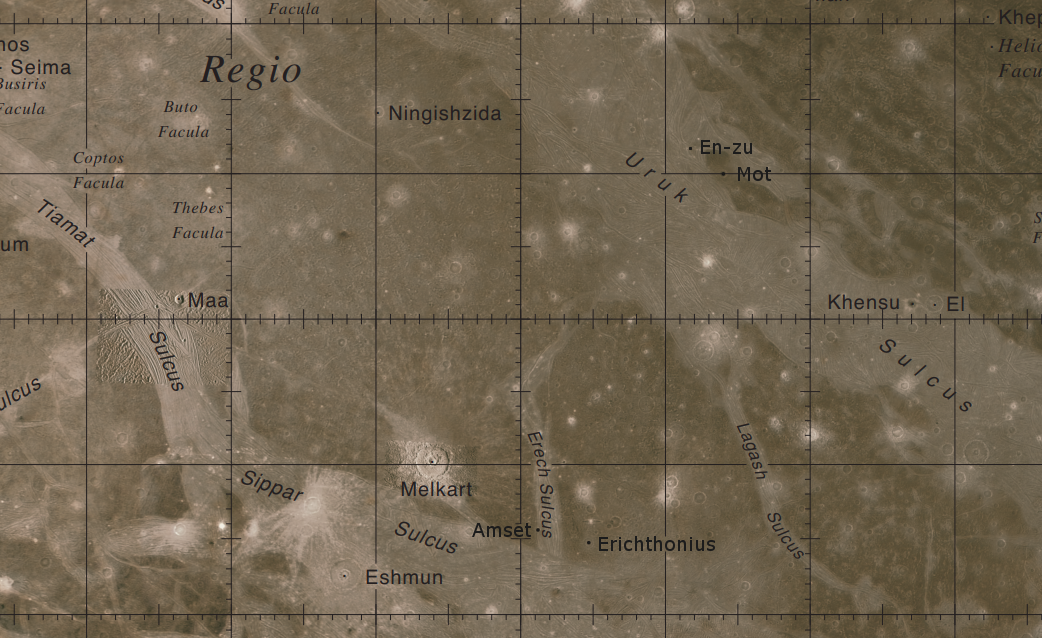
A map of the Uruk Sulcus quadrangle of Ganymede, showing the location of El crater on the right side of the map.

El is located entirely within Uruk Sulcus. To its west is the dark-ray crater Khensu. To its north east is the dark region called Galileo Regio while to its southwest is another massive dark region called Marius Regio.

El is located in the Uruk quadrangle on Ganymede (designated Jg8).

== See also ==
- List of craters on Ganymede
- Meteor
