= Uruk Sulcus =

Bright region on Ganymede

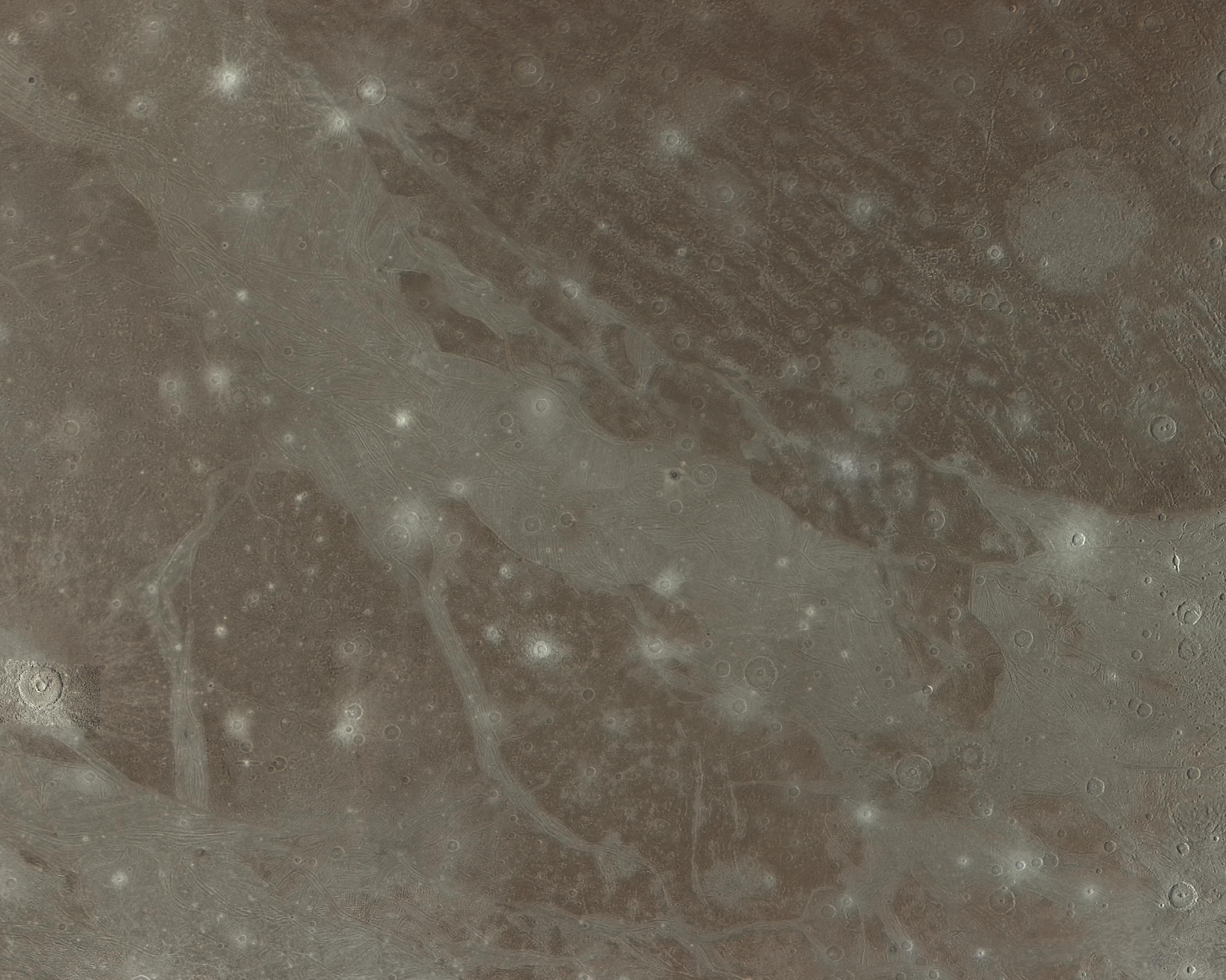
- A Mercator projection image of Uruk Sulcus
- Feature type: Sulcus
- Coordinates: 0.8°N 160.3°W
- Length: 2,200 km (1,400 mi)
- Eponym: Uruk

Uruk Sulcus is a bright region of grooved terrain on Jupiter's largest moon Ganymede. Its length is approximately 2,200 km (1,400 mi) and is thought to be younger than the darker material in nearby Galileo Regio and similar regions elsewhere on the moon.

== Naming ==
The feature is named after Uruk, a Mesopotamian city that, in myth and literature, was ruled by the legendary Gilgamesh,—the protagonist of the Epic of Gilgamesh, one of the oldest surviving literatures in history. The name was adopted by the International Astronomical Union (IAU) in accordance with the theme that surface features and craters on Ganymede should be named after deities, heroes and places from Ancient Middle Eastern mythology, such as Mesopotamian mythology. The sulcus's name was approved by the IAU in 1979.

== Geography ==
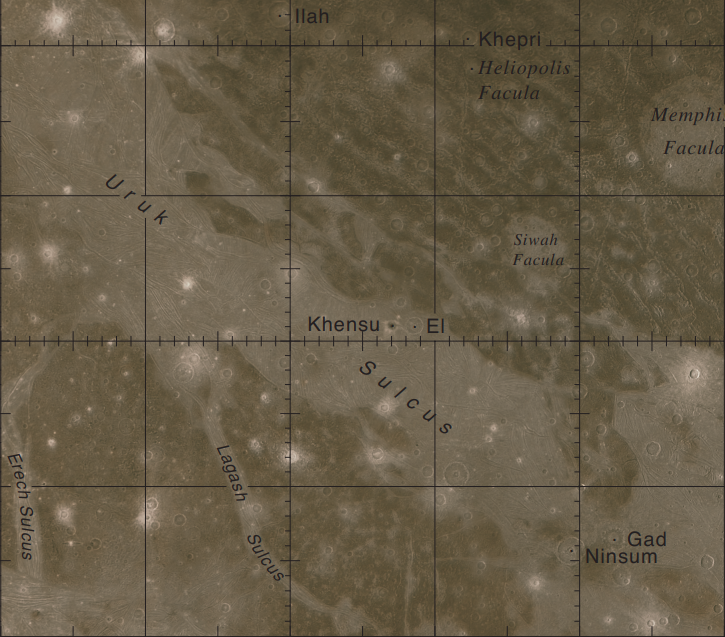
A map of Uruk Sulcus and its surrounding vicinity

Uruk Sulcus is located between two dark regions on Ganymede—Marius Regio to the southwest, and Galileo Regio to the northeast. The sulcus forms the boundary between the two.

Uruk Sulcus begins between the vicinity where two other sulci, Nippur Sulcus and Masha Sulcus, meet each other, running from the northwest to the southeast before terminating at the point between the craters Ninsum and Gad.

A handful of craters within the sulcus have been given names by the IAU such as Khensu and El, which are beside each other, and En-zu and Mot.

The Uruk quadrangle of Ganymede (designated Jg8) is named after this sulcus. Most of Uruk Sulcus is located within this quadrangle, but officially, a small portion of its eastern part belongs to the Memphis Facula quadrangle (designated Jg7), and a very small portion of its northwesternmost parts crosses over into the Philus quadrangle (designated Jg4).

== Geology and Characteristics ==
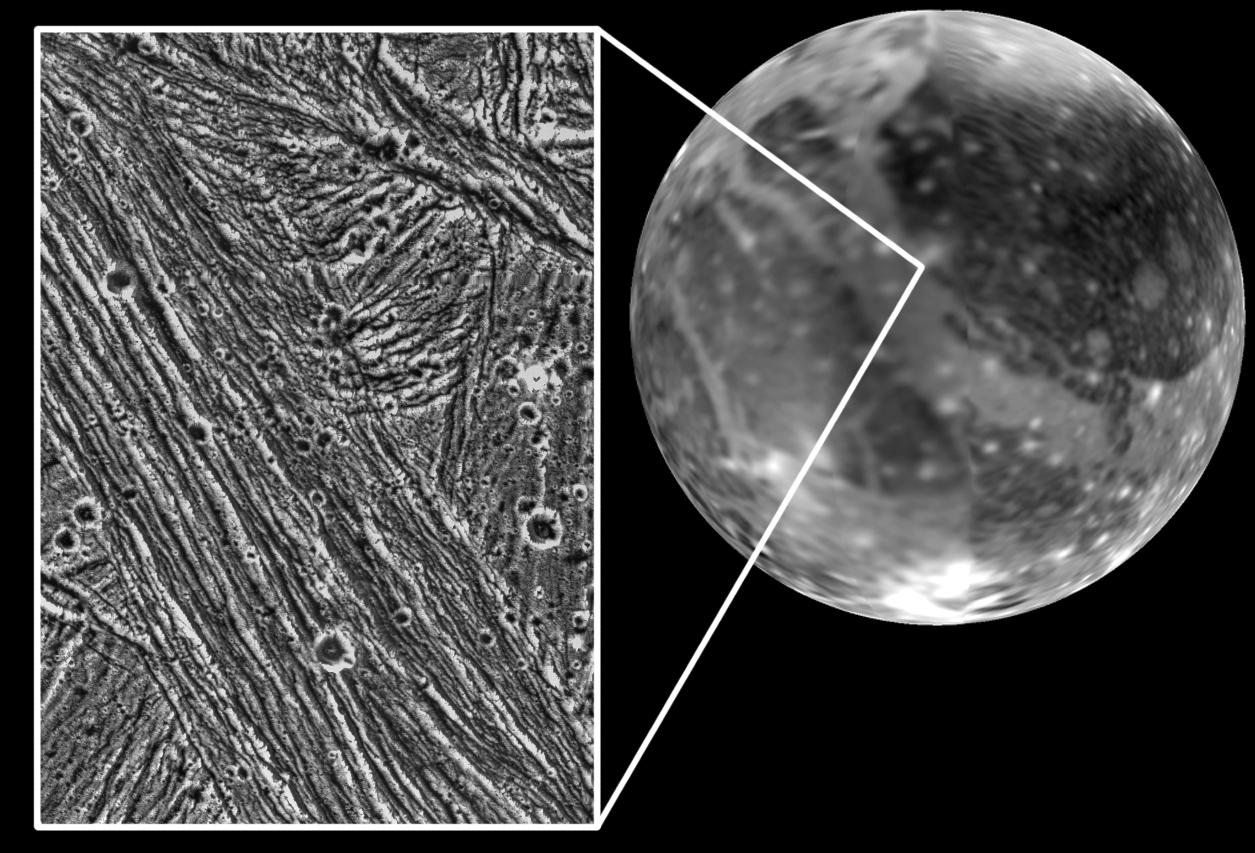
View of a portion of the Uruk Sulcus region on Ganymede, showing the fine details of the grooved terrain that are the principal features in the brighter regions of this moon

Like many bright regions on Ganymede, Uruk Sulcus is a bright-terrain feature characterized by multiple sets of ridges and grooves. These younger, sinuous, trending grooves clearly cut across older, darker terrains such as the nearby Galileo and Marius Regiones, apparently disrupting or destroying them in the process. This process, in which older terrain is erased or overlain by newer, fresher terrain through tectonic activity, is widespread across the moon’s surface and plays a major role in shaping its overall appearance. Fresh, clean reflects a lot of sunlight, making them brighter than older regions with ice that have been contaminated by dark materials accumulated over the eons.

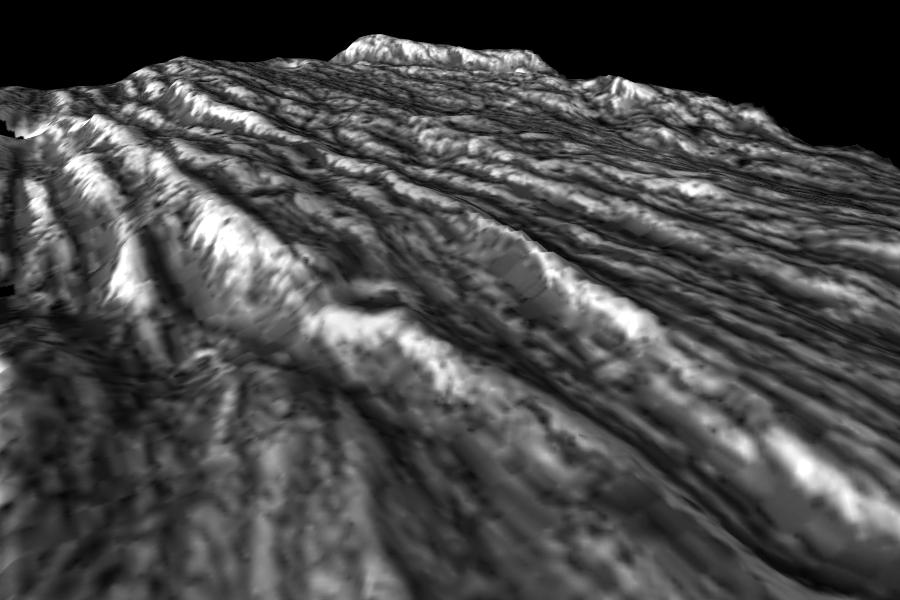
A computer-generated 3D perspective view of ridges in the Uruk Sulcus. Bright materials seem to have been exposed at the top of the ridges.

Bright terrains on Ganymede such as Uruk Sulcus are analogous to the dark Lunar maria on the Earth's Moon in terms of age, as both are considered the youngest parts of their respective moons’ surfaces. The dark basaltic lava flows that formed the younger regions of the Moon’s surface are instead represented or replaced by bright water ice on Ganymede. Dark terrains on Ganymede, in turn, are analogous to the bright Lunar highlands, which are older than the Lunar maria.

Attempts to construct a three-dimensional map of the grooves and troughs of Uruk Sulcus have shown that bright, icy material is exposed along their ridge crests, while darker material has accumulated in the lower-lying areas.

== Exploration and Observation ==
As of 2025, a total three spacecraft were able to explore Uruk Sulcus—Voyager 1, Voyager 2 and the Galileo spacecraft

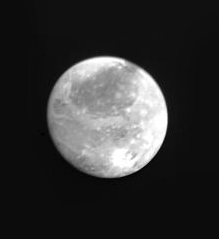
A distant image of Ganymede, taken by Voyager 1 in February 1979. Uruk Sulcus is the bright area running in between the two dark regions in this image.

Voyager 1 imaged Uruk Sulcus only from a distance during its approach to the Jovian system in late February 1979. By the time it reached its closest approach to Ganymede in March 1979, Uruk Sulcus had rotated onto the moon's far side, precluding high-resolution imaging.

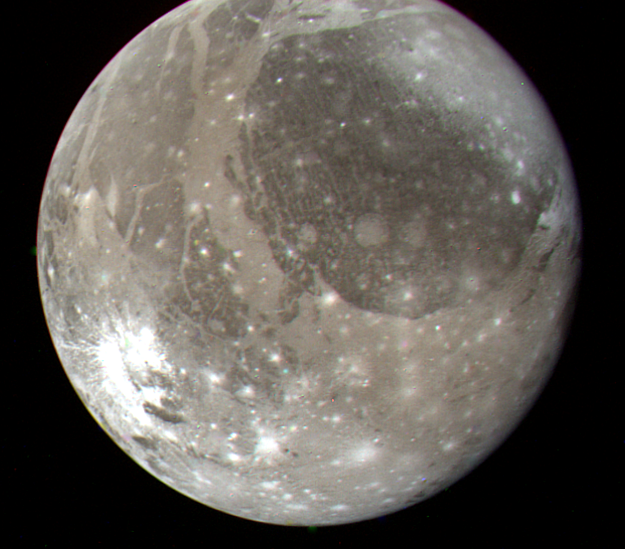
A mosaic photograph of Ganymede, showing Uruk Sulcus at the center of the image, taken by Voyager 2 in July 1979.

Voyager 2 also conducted a brief flyby of Ganymede in July 1979. It obtained medium-resolution images of Uruk Sulcus that were of significantly higher quality than those acquired by Voyager 1. However, because the encounter was only a brief flyby, the spacecraft did not pass close enough to the sulcus to obtain close-up images.

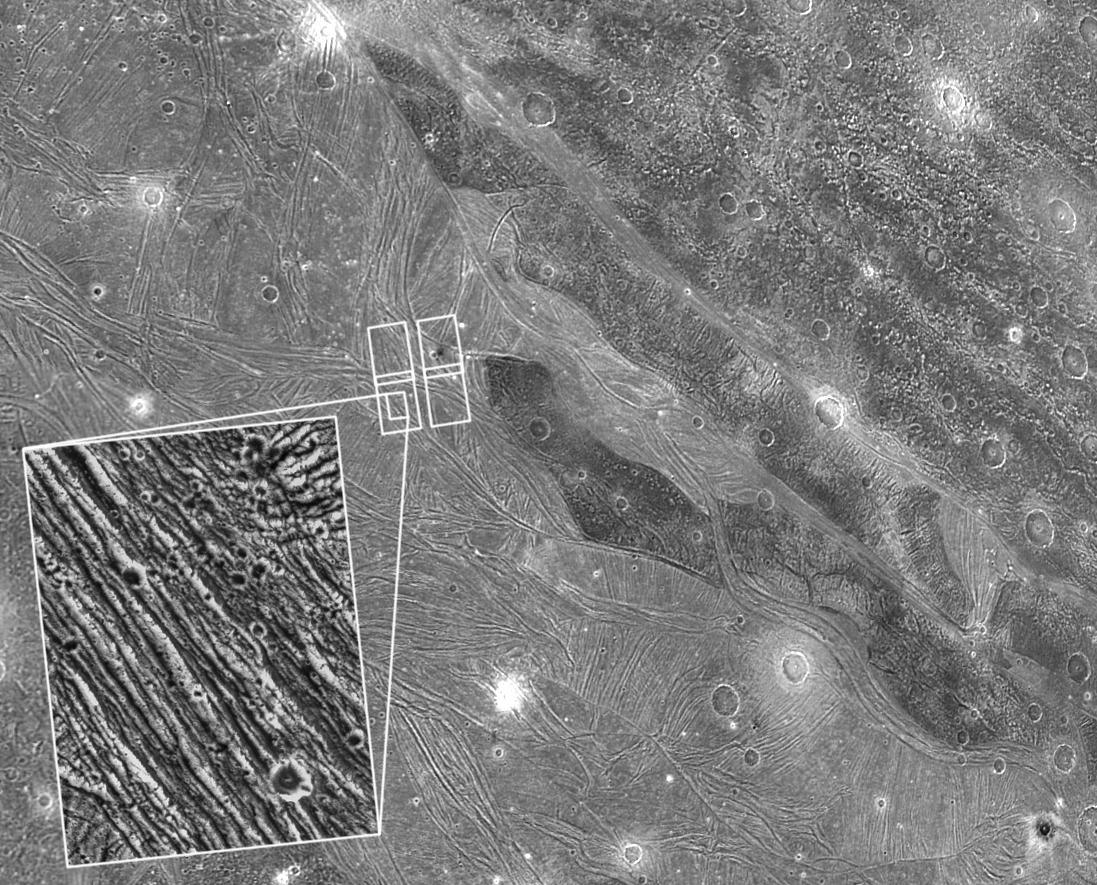
A comparative view of a region of Ganymede's Uruk Sulcus. Galileo's close-up image is placed on top of a lower resolution Voyager 2 image that was taken 17 years earlier.

Uruk Sulcus was observed in detail when the Galileo orbiter conducted two close flybys with Ganymede on 27 June and 6 September 1996. The encounter allowed stereo images to be acquired, though 30% of the Galileo images were lost on both passes due to onboard data processing and transmission limitations. During its other encounters with Ganymede, the images sent back by Galileo was able to see details as small as 74 m (243 ft) across. As of 2025, Galileo's close-up images of the Uruk are the best available images of the sulcus.

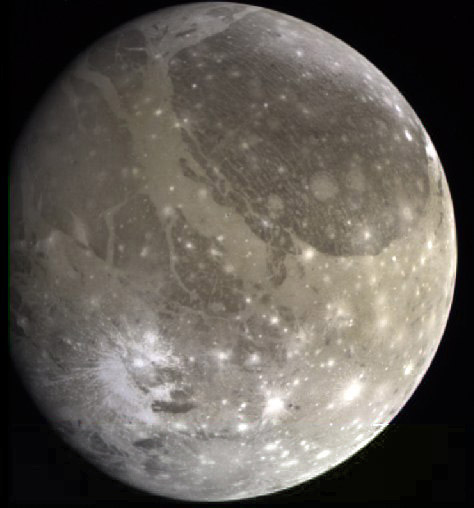
An gibbous image of Ganymede, showing the entirety of Uruk Sulcus, taken by Galileo in June 1996

In 2021, Uruk Sulcus was once again the subject of 3D geographic mapping. The said study is currently waiting for more data from the European Space Agency's (ESA) upcoming Jupiter Icy Moons Explorer (Juice) mission.

=== Future Mission ===
ESA's Juice mission is expected to reach the Jovian system in July 2031, and it will later start closely orbiting Ganymede around the year 2034 at a distance of as low as 500 kilometres (310 mi). It is expected to send high resolution images of Uruk Sulcus, outperforming even the best close-up images of Galileo.

== Gallery ==
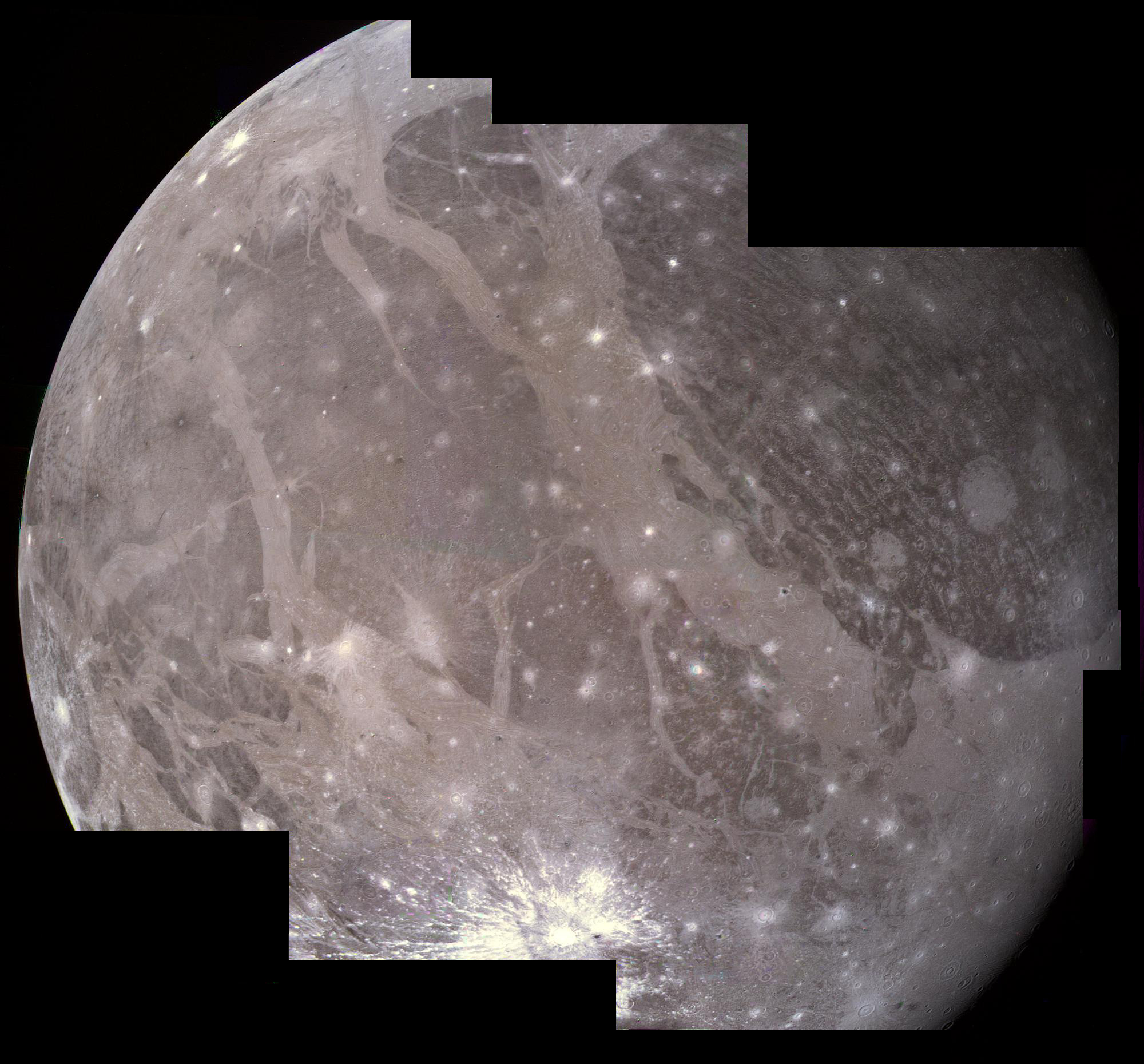
A mosaic image of Ganymede showing Uruk Sulcus, taken by Voyager 2 in July 1979

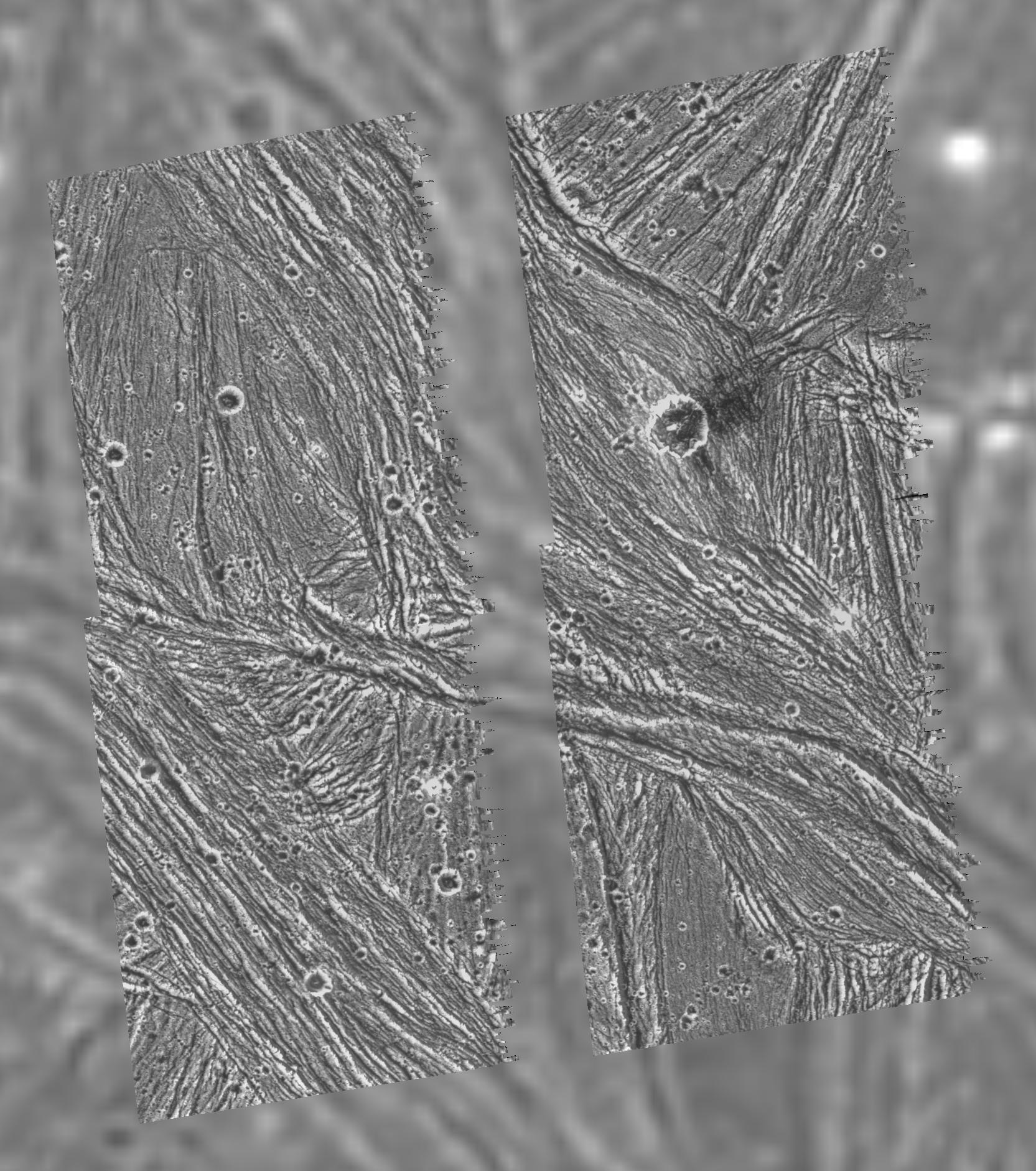
A comparative image of Uruk Sulcus, showing Galileo's higher-resolution images superimposed on Voyager 2's lower-resolution images of the same region, which revealed details of its parallel ridges and troughs. The Galileo version was taken in September 1997.

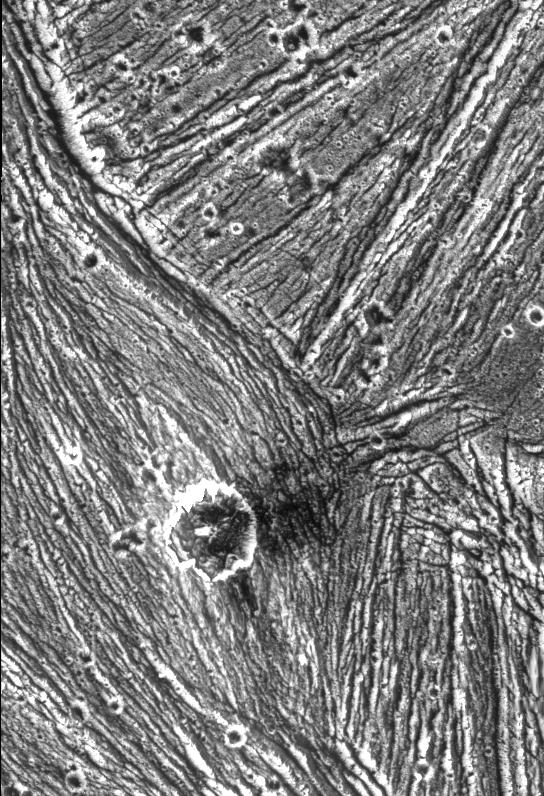
An image of between Uruk Sulcus, taken by the Galileo spacecraft in June 1996 The dark crater in the image is En-zu.

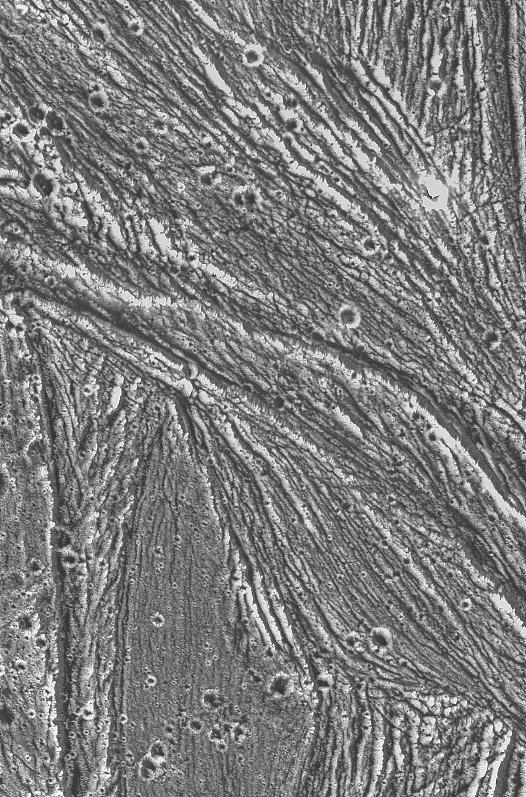
A close-up of a chaotic section of Uruk Sulcus, where older and newer terrains are mixing and merging, imaged by the Galileo in September 1997

== See also ==
Sulcus (geology)
