= Abba b. Martha =

Babylonian scholar

- Occupation: Talmudist
- Years active: Late 3rd century - early 4th century
- Known for: Escaping debt to the exilarch, adherence to Talmudic law despite pecuniary straits

Abba b. Martha was a Babylonian scholar of the end of the third century and beginning of the fourth. He seems to have been in poor circumstances. Once he incurred a debt to the resh galuta (exilarch), which he could not repay, and only by disguising himself did he at the time escape arrest for it. Later he was apprehended and sorely pressed for payment; but when the exilarch discovered that his debtor was a rabbinical scholar, he released him. His mother, Martha, seems to have been in easy circumstances; for, when Abba was bitten by a rabid dog and, in accordance with contemporary therapeutics, was obliged to drink through a tube of copper, Martha substituted one of gold. Notwithstanding his pecuniary straits, Abba did not take advantage of the Biblical and Talmudic law, according to which the Sabbatical year cancels all debts. He once owed some money to Rabbah, and paid it in the year of release, using the form of a donation.
