= Khensu (crater) =

Crater on Ganymede

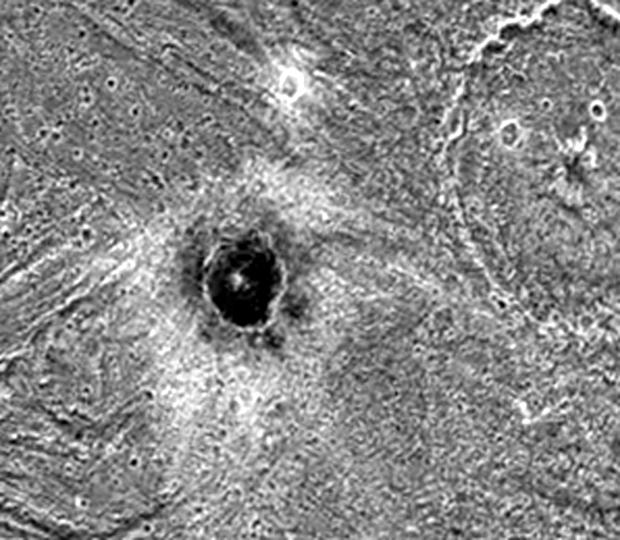
- A Galileo image of Khensu, taken on September 6, 1996. The crater to the east is El.
- Feature type: Darked-floor Crater
- Coordinates: 1.0°N 152.9°W
- Diameter: 14.2 kilometres (8.8 mi) 17 kilometres (11 mi)
- Eponym: Khensu

Khensu is an impact crater on Ganymede, the largest moon of Jupiter. It is a dark-floored crater with a bright ejecta blanket located in the grooved terrain region called Uruk Sulcus.

== Naming ==
Khensu is named after the Egyptian god Khensu (also known as Khonsu), the youthful god of the Moon, the lunar phases, and travelers. According to Egyptian mythology during the New Kingdom of Egypt, he is the son of the supreme Egyptian god Amun-Ra and his wife Mut whose worship was centered in Thebes, the capital of Ancient Egypt.

According to one myth, he gambled with another moon god named Thoth and lost, which caused Khensu to lose a significant portion of his moonlight, thus explaining why the Moon is undergoing phases why and is not as bright as the Sun anymore. The International Astronomical Union (IAU) approved the name for Khensu in 1999.

The IAU ruled that craters on Ganymede like Khensu should be named after deities, heroes or places from Ancient Middle Eastern mythologies, including Egyptian mythology. The IAU approved the named for Khensu in 1997.

Another crater on Ganymede called Khonsu shares the same deity from whom Khensu derives its name (Khonsu being an alternative transliteration of Khensu).

== Location ==
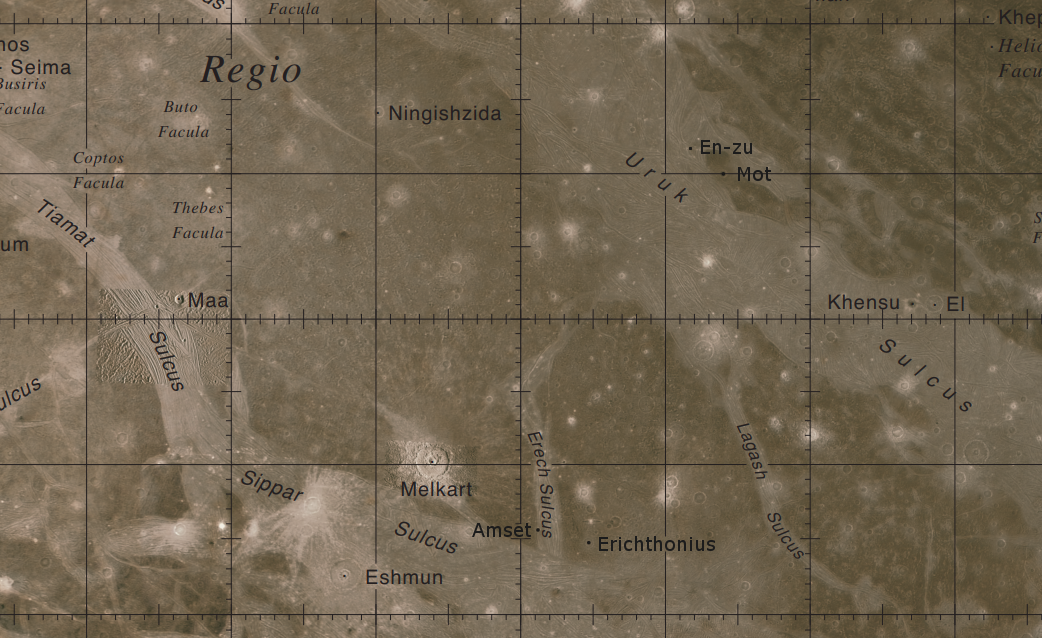
A map of the Uruk Sulcus quadrangle of Ganymede, showing the location of Khensu crater. The crater is on the right side of the map.

Khensu is a relatively small crater located entirely within the bright and young surface feature called Uruk Sulcus. It is only 14.2 kilometres (8.8 mi) across according to NASA, or 17 kilometres (11 mi) across according to the United States Geological Survey. To the crater's north is the extensive dark, ancient terrain called Galileo Regio, while to the south is another dark region called Marius Regio.

A few kilometers directly to the east of Khensu lies the crater El.

Khensu is a part of the Uruk quadrangle (designated Jg8) of Ganymede.

Khensu lies on the hemisphere of Ganymede that permanently faces away from Jupiter. This situation is a result of the moon's synchronous rotation around its parent planet. As a consequence, an observer standing at Khensu would never see Jupiter in the sky. (Note: For moons in synchronous rotation, such as Ganymede, 0° longitude corresponds to the part of the surface that always faces Jupiter. Regions between 90° W and 270° W longitude never face the moon's parent planet.)

== Morphology and Formation ==
Little information is known about Khensu. There is no definitely explanation as to why the crater's interior is very dark. The dark component may be residual dark material from the impactor that formed the crater. According to the book "Atlas of the Galilean Satellites" by Paul Schenk, the redness and darkness of Khensu are consistent with contamination of the ejecta by an unusual impactor.

Another possibility is that the impactor may have punched through the bright surface of Ganymede, revealing a darker sublayer beneath. According to a study by Namitha Baby, the dark material found on Khensu's floor came from within Ganymede rather than from outside it. The study suggests that the dark material excavated by the impactor that created Khensu crater was located approximately 1.36 kilometres (0.85 mi) beneath the surface at the site where the crater formed.

Because of its characteristic, Khensu has been classified as a "dark-floored" or "dark halo" crater by researchers.

Other craters that are identified as dark craters include Kittu and Nergal.

== Exploration ==
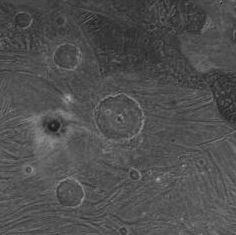
The craters Khensu (left) and El (center), taken by Voyager 2 in July 1979.

As of 2026, a total of two spacecraft have photographed Khensu and its neighboring craters: Voyager 2 and Galileo

The first spacecraft to explore and photograph Khensus was Voyager 2, which flew by Ganymede in July 1979. It revealed Khensu's mysterious, dark nature.

The next and last spacecraft to visit Khensu was Galileo, which flew above Khensu in September 1996. The probe was able to resolve details as small as 111 metres (364 ft) in its images.

=== Future Mission ===
The next spacecraft dedicated to studying Ganymede is the European Space Agency's (ESA) Jupiter Icy Moons Explorer (Juice) spacecraft. The probe will arrive at Jupiter in July 2031, and after spending approximately three and a half years orbiting Jupiter and performing multiple flybys of Europa, Callisto and Ganymede, Juice will settle into a low polar orbit around Ganymede at a distance of just 500 kilometres (310 mi). Juiceis expected to provide clearer images of Khensu, surpassing even the quality of Galileo's.

== See also ==
- List of craters on Ganymede
- Meteor
