= Tiamat Sulcus =

Bright region on Ganymede

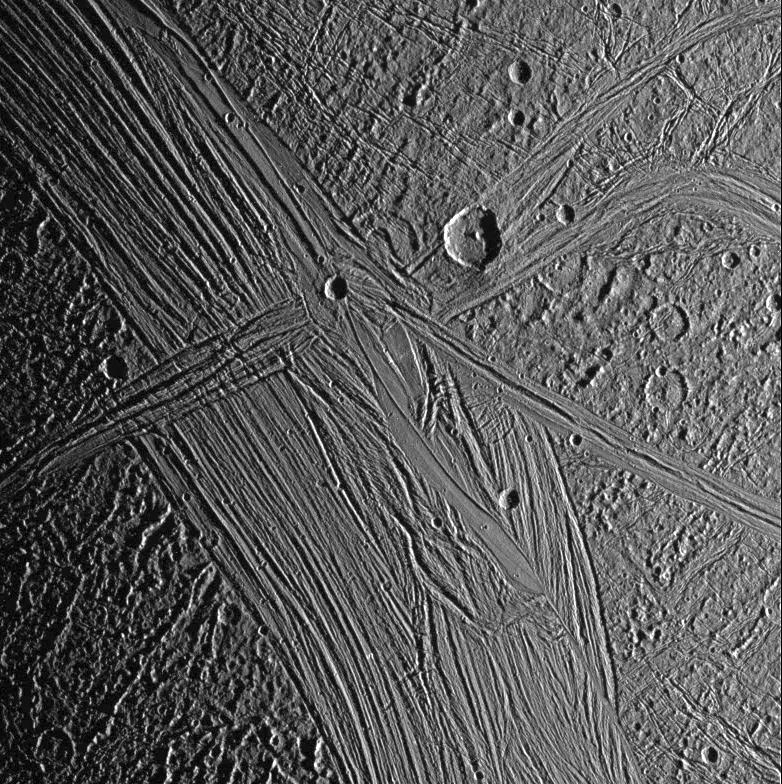
- An image of a section of Tiamat Sulcus, taken by the Galileo space probe on July 15, 1998. The large crater slightly to the upper right is Maa, while another sulcus called Kishar Sulcus (running from left to upper right) cuts through and divides Tiamat Sulcus in half.
- Feature type: Sulcus
- Location: Ganymede, Jupiter
- Coordinates: 4°08′N 209°06′W
- Length: 1,330 km (830 mi)
- Naming: 1979
- Eponym: Tiamat

Tiamat Sulcus is a bright, grooved terrain, or sulcus, on Ganymede, the largest moon of the planet Jupiter.

== Naming ==
The sulcus is named after Tiamat, the embodiment of the primordial sea of chaos who gave birth to the gods in Assyro-Babylonian mythology, but was defeated by her own children when the gods decided to bring order out of the chaos. The International Astronomical Union (IAU) chose this name in line with the theme that all surface features on Ganymede, such as sulci and craters, should be named after deities, heroes, personifications and places from Ancient Middle Eastern mythologies, including Assyro-Babylonian mythology.

The IAU approved the name for Tiamat Sulcus in 1979.

== Geography ==
Tiamat Sulcus is at least 1,330 kilometres (830 mi) long. It is located between two dark areas on Ganymede (called regiones)—Melotte Regio to the southwest, and Marius Regio to the northeast. Tiamat Sulcus marks the boundary between the two aforementioned regiones.

Tiamat Sulcus starts from the southwest of a palimpsest, or "ghost crater", called Busiris Facula, running towards the southeast before terminating at the starting point of another sulcus called Sippar Sulcus.

About two-thirds of the way before reaching its end, Tiamat Sulcus is dissected by another, narrower sulcus called Kishar Sulcus. The crater called Maa is located near this divide. The southern segment of Tiamat Sulcus across the Kishar Sulcus is broader than its northern segment, suggesting that the extension of Tiamat was greater south of Kishar than to the north. In addition, the section of Kishar Sulcus east of Tiamat Sulcus appears to have undergone horizontal displacement relative to the western section, which is consistent with motion along a northwest–southeast–trending strike-slip fault.

Tiamat Sulcus has a grooved appearance, which is typical of all sulci on Ganymede. The bright, grooved terrains on Ganymede (including Tiamat Sulcus) are areas where fresher, newer materials—such as clean water ice—well up from beneath the moon’s surface, erasing preexisting, older terrain marked by dark regions such as the aforementioned Marius and Melotte Regio, and recoating it with brighter material. Clean ice reflects a lot of sunlight, making Tiamat Sulcus look brighter than the dark regiones surrounding it.

Bright terrains on Ganymede are analogous to the dark Lunar maria on the Earth's Moon in terms of age as both are considered the youngest parts of their respective moons. Dark terrains, in turn, are analogous to the bright Lunar highlands which are older than the surface of Lunar maria. However, instead of basaltic lava like those found on the Moon’s maria, bright water ice makes up Ganymede’s grooved terrain.

Tiamat Sulcus is also the namesake of one of the fifteen quadrangles on Ganymede. The Tiamat quadrangle is designated as Jg9. However, approximately half of Tiamat Sulcus is actually located in the neighboring Uruk quadrangle (designated Jg8) to the east.

== Exploration ==
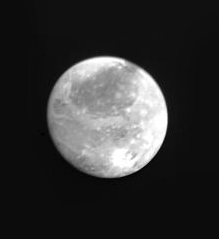
A low resolution image of Ganymede, taken by Voyager 1 in February 1979. Tiamat Sulcus is located in the lower left of the image, near the moon's terminator.

As Voyager 1 was approaching Ganymede on February 27 and 28, it was able to take distant images of Tiamat Sulcus from a few million kilometers away. The sulcus barely appeared in its low-resolution images, and by the time Voyager 1 made its closest approach to Ganymede in March 1979, Tiamat Sulcus was already on the night side of the moon.

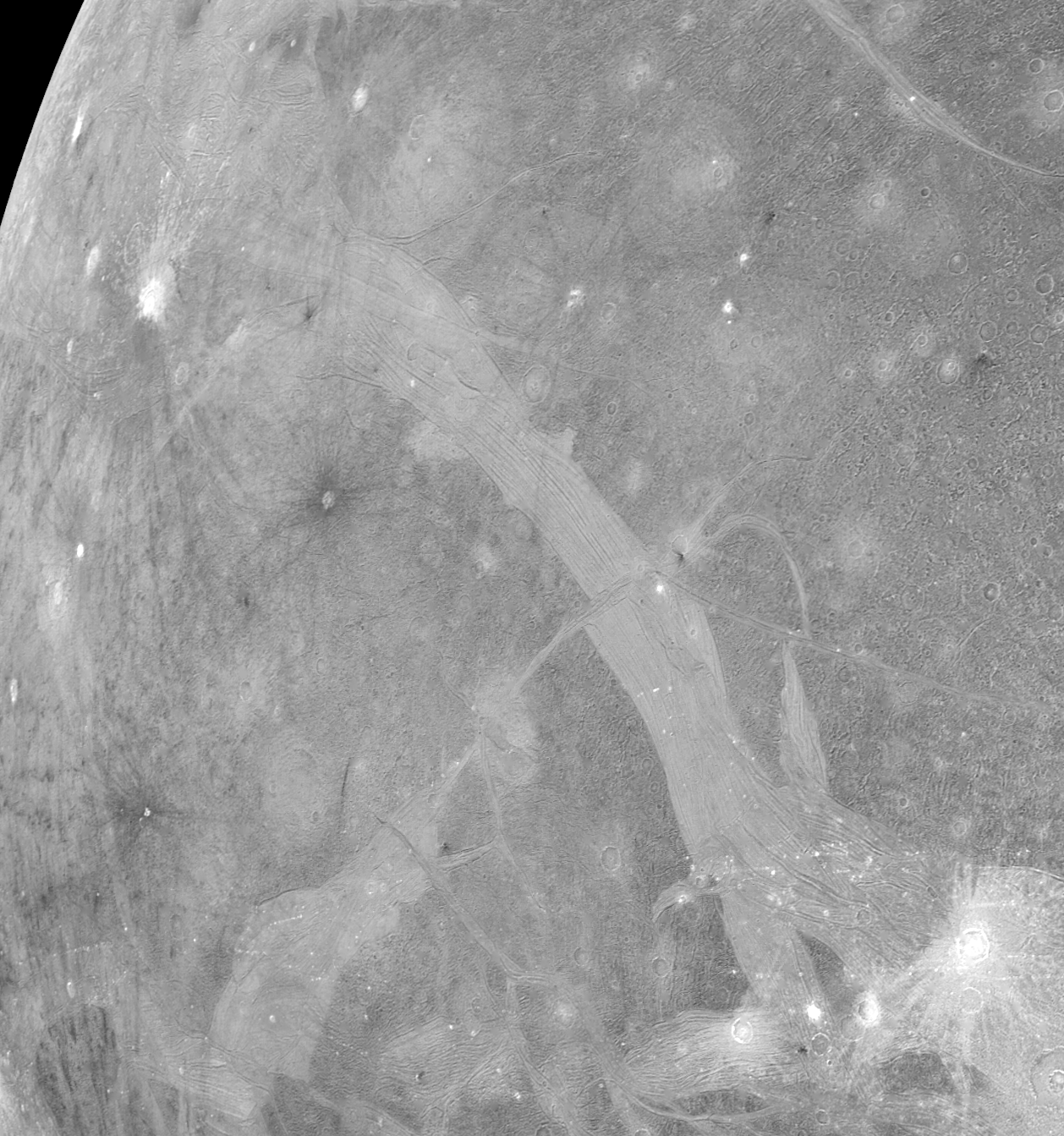
A mosaic image of Tiamat Sulcus (bright arc in the middle), taken by Voyager 2 in July 1979

Voyager 2 was in a good position when it made a brief flyby of Ganymede in July 1979. It appeared at the center and edges of its images.

Galileo became the next probe to observe Tiamat Sulcus and, as of 2025, was the last probe to have done so. It was able to fly as low as 49,000 kilometres (30,000 mi) when it took closeup images of Tiamat Sulcus, allowing it to see the tectonic interactions between it, Kishar Sulcus, and the surrounding regiones more clearly. Galileo obtained images with a resolution as high as 494 m (1,621 ft) per pixel during this flyby.

== See also ==
- Sulcus (geology)
- Ganymede (moon)
