= Kittu (crater) =

Crater on Ganymede

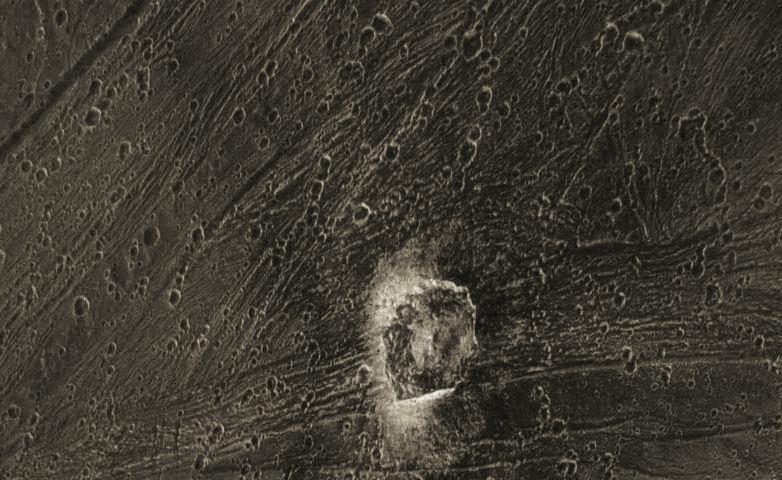
- The crater Kittu, imaged by the Galileo spacecraft on April 5, 1997.
- Feature type: Dark ray crater
- Coordinates: 0.4°N 334.6°W
- Diameter: 15.0 kilometres (9.3 mi)
- Eponym: Kittu

Kittu crater is a small crater on Jupiter's moon Ganymede. It is approximately 15 km (9.3 mi) in diameter and it exhibits a dark ray system which is rare on Ganymede.

== Naming ==
Kittu is named after the Mesopotamian goddess Kittu (also known as Kittum). She was the goddess of truth, justice and the law in Assyro-Babylonian mythology. The International Astronomical Union (IAU) has ruled that craters and features on Ganymede's surface be named after deities, heroes and places from Ancient Middle Eastern mythology, which includes Mesopotamian mythology. The IAU approved Kittu's name in 1985.

== Location ==
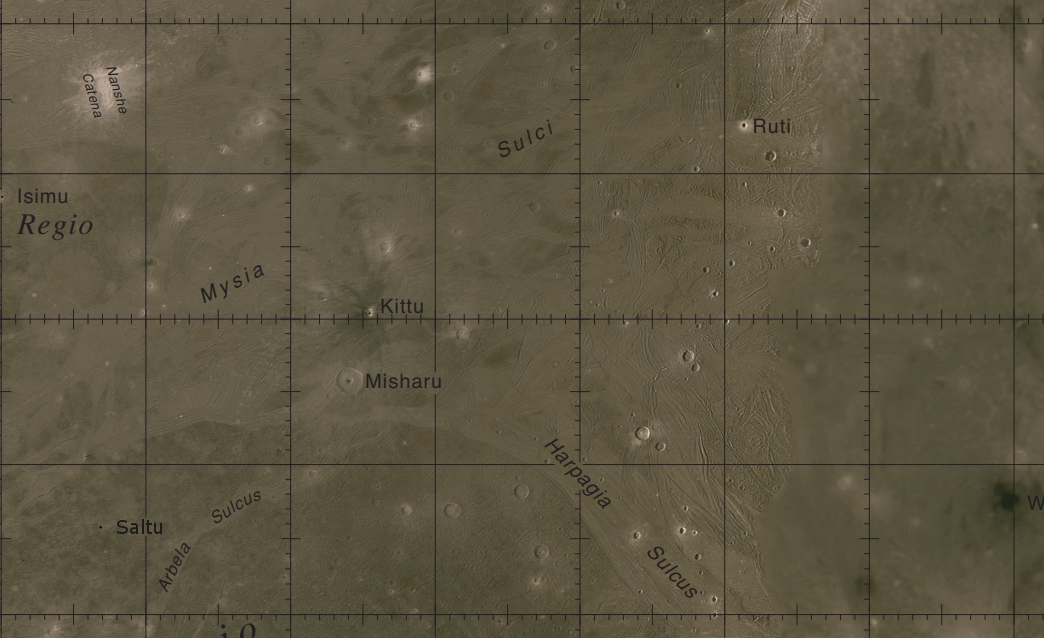
A map of Ganymede's Misharu quadrangle. Kittu lies near the middle of the map.

Kittu is located north of Nicholson Regio, and east of Barnard Regio along Ganymede's equator within the chaotic, grooved terrain of Mysia Sulcus. Dozens of bright ray craters and halo craters surround Kittu, but they are all unnamed and their rays and halos are relatively faint compared to brighter ray craters like Tros or Enkidu.

Kittu is part of the Misharu quadrangle of Ganymede (designated Jg10). A crater with the same name as the quadrangle lies to the south of Kittu.

Kittu is located on the side of Ganymede that is always facing Jupiter—a result of the moon's synchronous rotation—near its Subjovian point (i.e. the point on a moon directly facing Jupiter where the planet will always be overhead). This means that an observer standing inside Kittu crater will always see Jupiter almost overhead at all times. (Note: For moons in synchronous rotation, such as Ganymede, 0° longitude corresponds to the part of the surface that always faces Jupiter. Regions between 90° W to 0° to 270° W longitude always face the moon’s parent planet.)

== Age ==
A study by Baby suggests that Kittu is the youngest crater within the Mysia–Harpagia unit of Ganymede. Models place constraints on the crater’s age, ranging from 0.2 to 1.5 billion years (based on the lunar-derived model) to less than 100 million years (based on the Jupiter–comet model).

== Geology ==
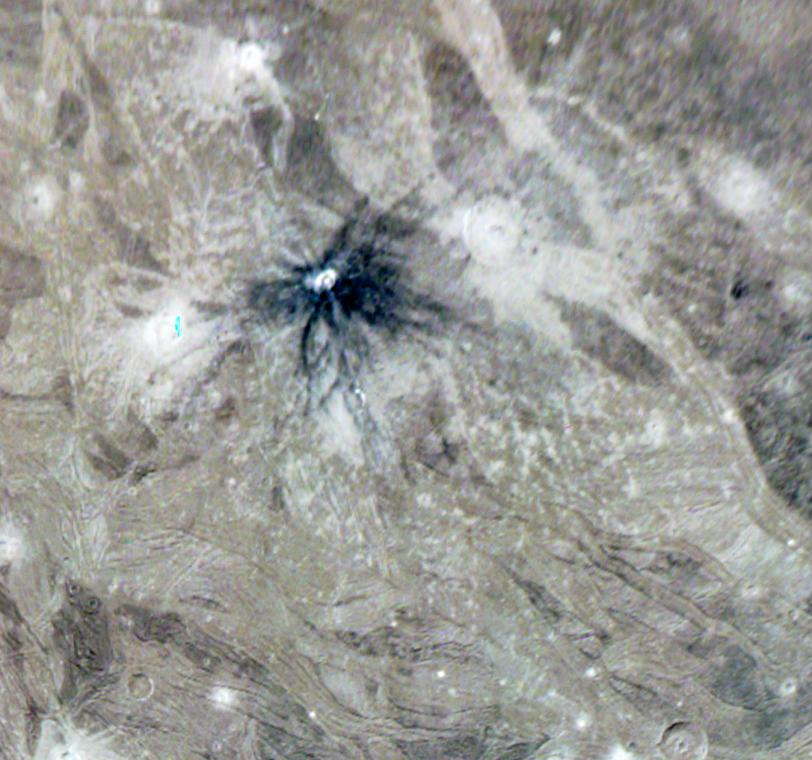
An enhanced color image of Kittu, taken by the Juno spacecraft in June 2021

Kittu exhibits a bright, white central peak and rim, but it is surrounded by dark, brownish materials. Because of these dark ejecta, Kittu is classified as a dark ray crater.

The diffused, dark rays emanating from the impact site are sprinkled thinly atop the surrounding grooved terrain. The dark material of the rays dusted across the surface is probably part of a dark impactor (an asteroid or comet) that contaminated the water ice that were strewn across the surface upon impact. As time went on, these dark materials started absorbing more heat from sunlight compared to the surrounding, brighter areas. This causes water ice molecules—which reflect a lot of sunlight—to evaporate and preferentially condense around brighter areas elsewhere since bright areas reflect more sunlight. This causes the dark areas to remain dark. A similar process is happening on Saturn's moon, Iapetus.

On the other hand, more recent studies strongly suggest that the rays from dark ray craters originate within Ganymede itself, rather than from the external impactors that formed the craters. The dark materials probably originated about 1.2 kilometres (0.75 mi) kilometer below the surface of the crater. The dark rays of Kittu have a reflectance of 6% in the near-infrared, which is significantly lower than that of other dark ray craters, such as Antum, which has a reflectance of 20%. Its ejecta is the darkest of all the dark ray craters on Ganymede, exhibiting a flatter and redder spectrum at visible to near-infrared wavelengths than the other dark ray craters. Spectroscopic studies reveal that the dark ejecta of Kittu consists of an approximately 50/50 mixture of carbonaceous material and hydrates. It is worth noting, however, that this situation is not unique to dark ray craters, as similar materials can be found on the surfaces of Ganymede’s dark regions.

The presence of carbonaceous material on Ganymede’s surface (including dark ray craters) may itself result from the long-term accumulation of impactor debris, which would obscure the distinction between impactor contamination and the excavation of indigenous Ganymede material. More data from future missions would be needed to successfully determine the source of the dark materials.

Other examples of dark ray craters on Ganymede are Antum, Khensu and Nergal.

The impactor hit one of Ganymede's grooved terrain and a straight segment of the crater's rim was created when a portion of the rim collapsed as it conformed to the trend of the older fault line.

== Observation and Exploration ==
Kittu is a relatively small and dark crater which makes it difficult to see. Only a few probes were able to image Kittu with enough details.

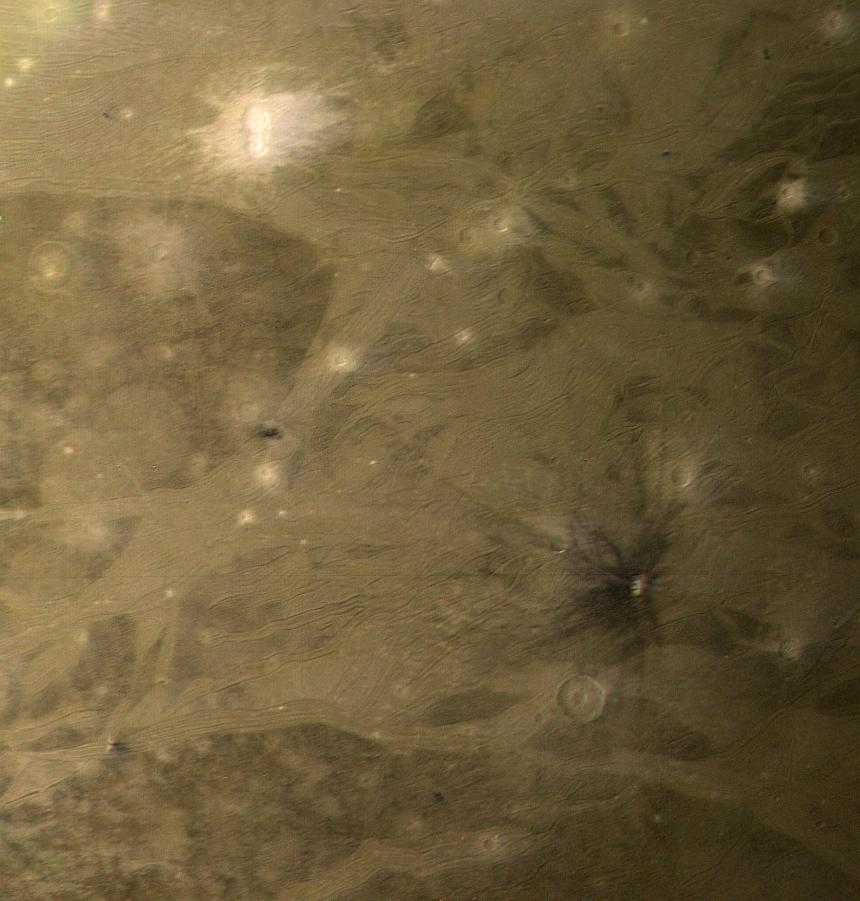
Kittu (lower right) with its dark rays, as seen in this image taken by Voyager 1 in March 1979

The Voyager 1 was the first probe to get a decent image of Kittu in March 1979.

However, it was not until the Galileo probe—which orbited Jupiter from December 1995 to September 2003—that the first high-resolution images of Kittu were taken. During its 7th orbit, Galileo captured exceptional photographs of the dark ray crater at a spatial resolution of 3 kilometres (1.9 mi) per pixel, making Kittu one of the best-photographed dark ray craters on Ganymede.

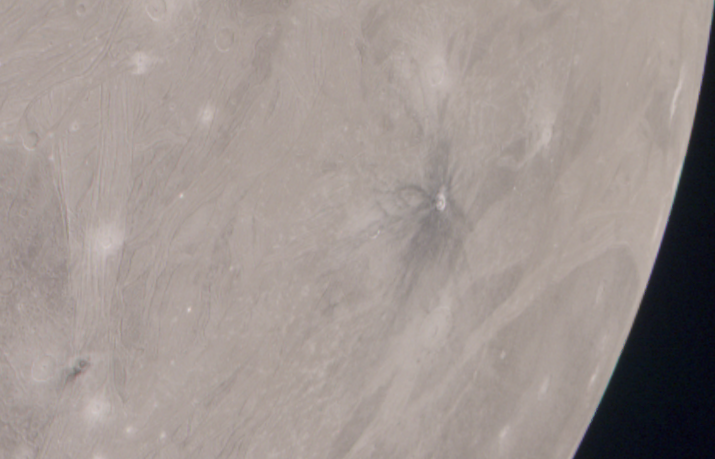
A flyover image of Kittu in natural color, taken by the Juno spacecraft in June 2021

In June 2021, the Juno spacecraft performed a close flyby of Ganymede during its 34th perijove in order to adjust its orbit around Jupiter. It was able to take decent photographs of the dark ray crater.

== Gallery ==
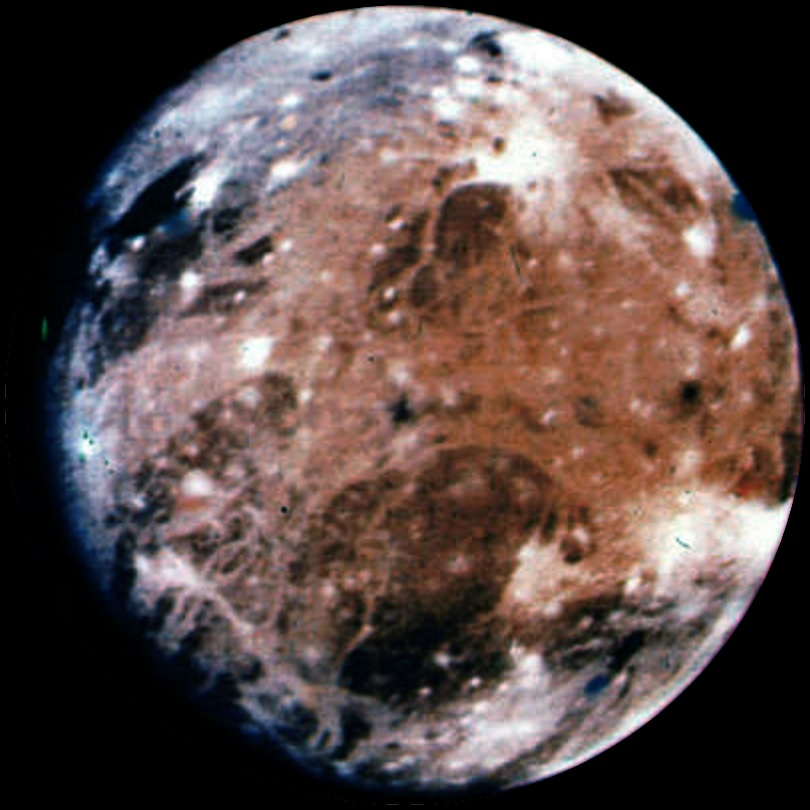
An enhanced color image of Ganymede showing Kittu crater (dark spot at the center), taken by Voyager 1.

== See also ==
- List of craters on Ganymede
- Meteor
