= Babylonian religion =

Religious practices of Babylonia

Babylonia's religion and mythology were largely influenced by its Sumerian counterparts and were written on clay tablets inscribed with the cuneiform script derived from Sumerian cuneiform. The myths were usually either written in Sumerian or Akkadian. Some Babylonian texts were translations into Akkadian from Sumerian of earlier texts, but the names of some deities were changed.

== Mythology and cosmology ==
Babylonian myths were greatly influenced by the Sumerian religion. Sometimes they were written on clay tablets inscribed with the cuneiform script derived from Sumerian cuneiform. The myths were usually either written in the Sumerian or Akkadian language. Some Babylonian texts were even translations into Akkadian from the Sumerian language of earlier texts, although the names of some deities were changed in Babylonian texts.

Many Babylonian deities, myths, and religious writings are singular to that culture; for example, the uniquely Babylonian deity, Marduk, replaced Enlil as the head of the mythological pantheon. The Enûma Eliš, a creation myth epic was an original Babylonian work. In it, Apsu and Tiamat created "the elements of the world", but fought for various reasons, with Tiamat winning but being slaughtered along with her army by Marduk. Marduk became the first king within Tiamat's split body, which created the earth and sky, and founded Babylon.

== Religious practices ==
Tablet fragments from the Neo-Babylonian period describe a series of festival days celebrating the New Year. The Festival began on the first day of the first Babylonian month, Nisannu, roughly corresponding to April/May in the Gregorian calendar. This festival celebrated the re-creation of the Earth, drawing from the Marduk-centered creation story described in the Enûma Eliš.

The pillaging or destruction of idols was considered to be a loss of divine patronage; during the Neo-Babylonian period, the Chaldean prince Marduk-apla-iddina II fled into the southern marshes of Mesopotamia with the statues of Babylon's gods to save them from the armies of Sennacherib of Assyria.

Babylonia mainly focused on the god Marduk, who is the national god of the Babylonian empire. However, there were also other gods that were worshipped such as Enlil, Enki, Inanna, Nabu, Nanna-Suen, Ninhursag, and Utu. At various times, a single god in Babylonian cities was assigned a primary "special duty" for each city, such as being "the god of earth and the air" or "the god of the sky", and seen as the god with the most influence in that city by far.

== See also ==
- Abba b. Martha, Babylonian scholar (third to fourth century)
- Ancient Mesopotamian religion
- Assyrian religion
- Religions of the ancient Near East
- Sumerian religion
- Tower of Babel
- Zoroastrianism
