= Thought (disambiguation) =

Thought is an instance of thinking.

Thought may also refer to:

- In philosophy, thought is also a synonym for idea
- School of thought, a collections of ideas that result from the adoption of a particular paradigm
- Thought: Fordham University Quarterly, published by Fordham University
- Thought: A Journal of Philosophy, published by Wiley-Blackwell for the Northern Institute of Philosophy
- "Thought" (essay), an essay by Gottlob Frege
- "Thought" (Myel), a short story by Leonid Andreyev
- Thought (film), a 1916 Russian silent film
- Thought (sculpture), a sculpture by S. D. Merkurov
- Thoughts (album), a 1985 album by Bill Dixon
- "Thoughts" (song), a 2013 song by Luna Sea
- "Thoughts", a 1969 song by Vanilla Fudge
- "Thoughts", a 2019 song by Charli XCX
- Pensées (trans. "Thoughts"), a 17th-century work by Blaise Pascal

== See also ==
- Thot (disambiguation)
