= Thoth (disambiguation) =

Thoth is an ancient Egyptian deity.

Thoth may also refer to:

== Arts and entertainment ==
- Thoth (film), a 2001 documentary
- Thoth (video game), 2016
- Thoth, a Goa'uld character in Stargate
- Thoth (DC Comics), the version of the deity appearing in DC Comics

== Other uses ==
- Thout or Thoth, the first month of the ancient Egyptian and Coptic calendars
- Thoth, a crater on Ganymede, the planet Jupiter's largest moon
- Thoth tarot deck, painted by Lady Frieda Harris according to instructions from Aleister Crowley
- S. K. Thoth (born c. 1956), or often just Thoth, American entertainer
- Thoth (operating system), developed at the University of Waterloo

== See also ==
- Jex Thoth, a band
- Society of Thoth, an undergraduate secret society at the University of British Columbia
- The Ring of Thoth a story by Arthur Conan Doyle
