= Anzu (crater) =

Crater on Ganymede

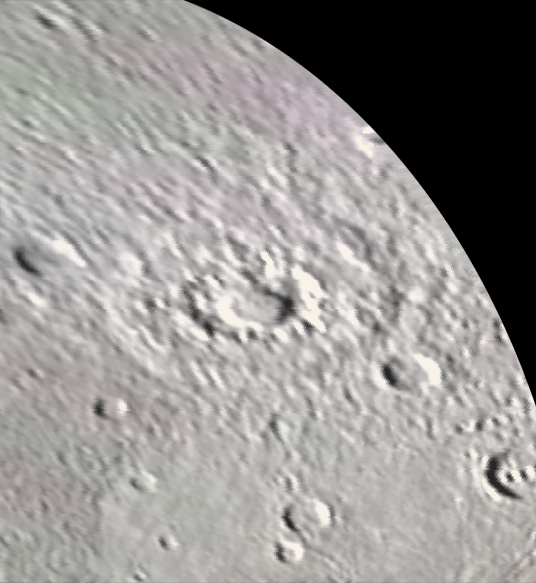
- A Mercator projection image of Anzu crater, taken by the Galileo space probe on June 26, 1997.
- Feature type: Anomalous Dome crater
- Coordinates: 63.51°N 62.73°W
- Diameter: 210 kilometres (130 mi)
- Eponym: Anzû

Anzu is a geologically uplifted and disrupted dome crater on Ganymede, the largest moon of Jupiter. It is approximately 210 kilometres (130 mi) wide.

== Naming ==
Anzu is named after a creature from Mesopotamian mythology called the Anzû (also known as Zu or Imdugud). It has the body and wings of an eagle and the head of a lion, and is famous for stealing the Tablet of Destinies, a sacred clay tablet that bestows supreme power upon its holder, from Enlil, the supreme god of Mesopotamian mythology. Anzû was eventually slain by the gods, and the tablet was recovered.

The International Astronomical Union (IAU) chose this name in accordance with the convention that surface features on Ganymede are to be named after deities, figures, and places from ancient Middle Eastern mythologies, including Mesopotamian mythology, from which Anzû originates.

The name for the crater was approved by the IAU in 2000.

The massive, furrow surface feature on Ganymede called Zu Fossae is named after the same character from Babylonian mythology.

In addition, another crater on Ganymede, called En-zu, has a name that is homonymous with Anzu.

== Location ==
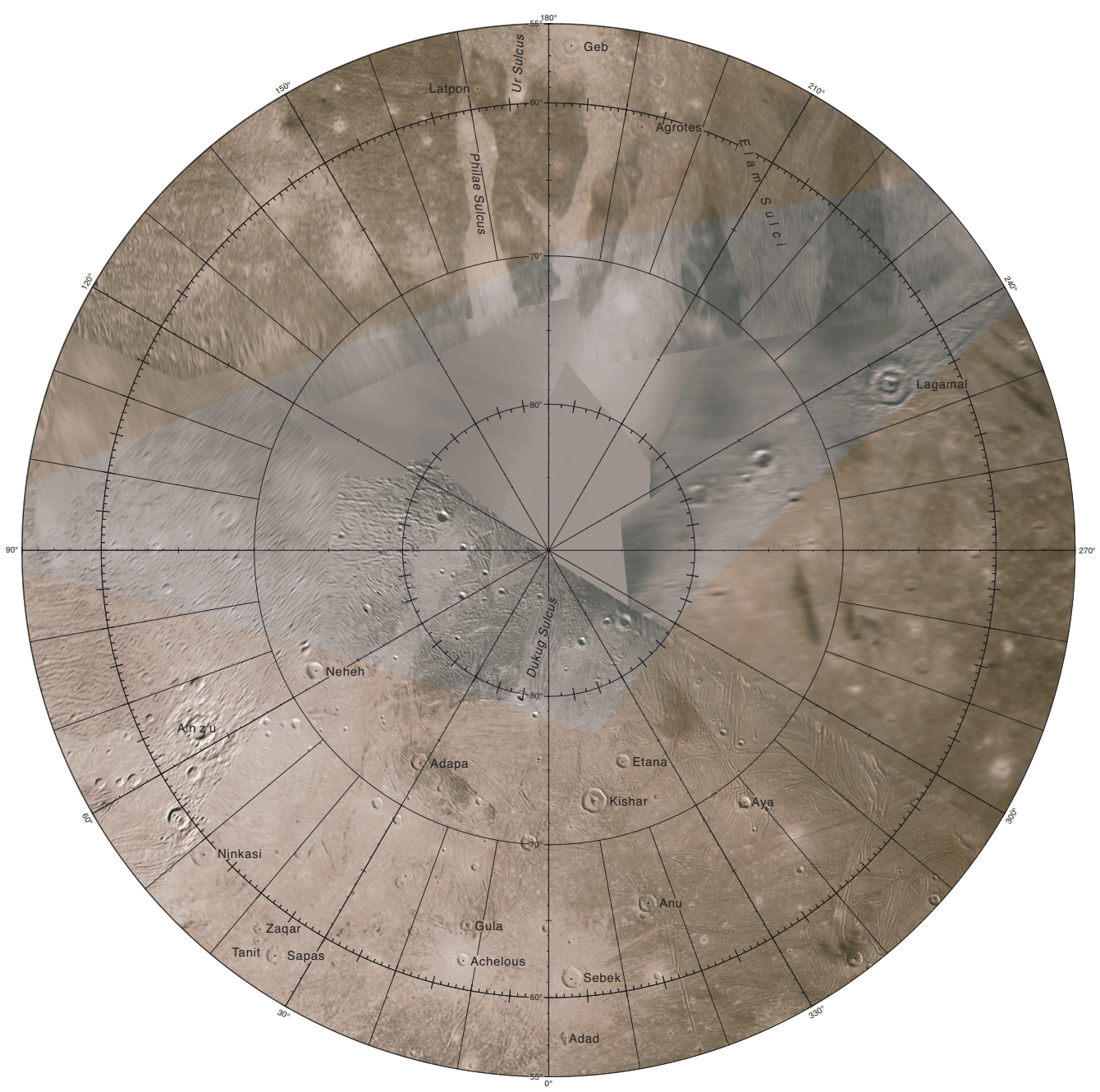
A map of Ganymede's north pole, showing Anzu at the lower left of the map.

Anzu is located in the far northern hemisphere of Ganymede, on the northwestern side of the bright grooved terrain known as Xibalba Sulcus. To the southeast of Anzu are the neighboring craters Ninkasi and Sapas.

Anzu is located within the northern edge of the Perrine Regio quadrangle (designated Jg2) of Ganymede.

Anzu crater lies on the Jovian-facing hemisphere of Ganymede, which permanently faces Jupiter due to the moon's synchronous rotation. As a result, an observer standing within Anzu crater would see Jupiter remain in the same position in the sky at all times. (Note: For moons in synchronous rotation, such as Ganymede, 0° longitude corresponds to the part of the surface that always faces Jupiter. Regions between 90° W to 0° to 270° W longitude always face the moon's parent planet.)

== Morphology and formation ==
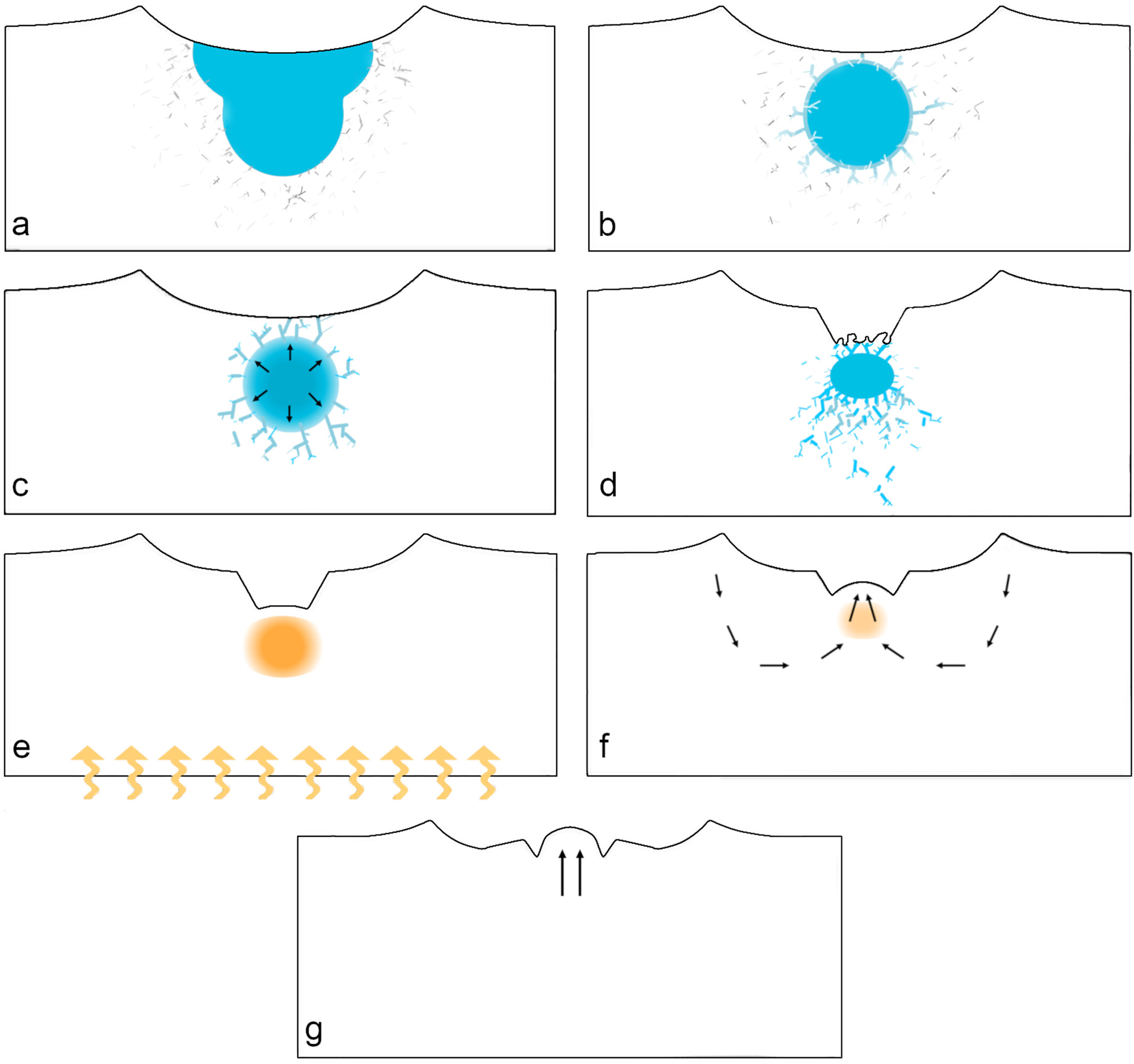
A diagram showing the steps in the formation of pits dome craters on icy moons. It shows how the refreezing of meltwater from meteorite impacts can cause both the formation of sinkholes and the dome-forming expansion of an icy crust.

Anzu is a penedome crater characterized by a central dome and a donut-shaped uplifted surface surrounding it, within which the rest of the crater floor is contained. It is also unusual in that it is elevated above the surrounding plains of Xibalba Sulcus—the opposite of most craters. Such penedome-pedestal craters are common on icy moons like Ganymede but are rare on rocky bodies such as the Earth's Moon or the planet Mercury.

According to a brief study by Dr. Oliver White, the icy Galilean moons Ganymede and Callisto display a wide range of impact crater morphologies that differ markedly from those found on rocky bodies such as the Earth's Moon and Mercury. These differences are attributed to variations in impactor size and to the physical structure of the moons' ice shells at the time of impact, including the presence of a cold, rigid surface layer of water ice, warmer and more ductile ice at depth, and, in some cases, subsurface liquid water.

Smaller impact features, including pit craters and dome craters, are generally younger and exhibit relatively high topographic relief. These craters are interpreted as having formed within a cold, rigid near-surface ice layer. Their characteristic central pits and surrounding annuli are thought to result from the drainage and subsequent freezing of subsurface pockets of impact-generated melt.

Larger impact features, such as anomalous dome craters like Anzu, typically display lower topographic relief and more subdued rims and floors. These craters are interpreted as having formed when impacts penetrated through the cold surface ice into a mechanically weak subsurface layer composed of warm, ductile ice.

Impact melt is thought to have played a secondary role in the formation of dome craters, which primarily result from deformation and relaxation within warm subsurface ice. Studies suggest that dome features formed when meltwater accumulated beneath a crater after impact heating melted the icy surface. As this meltwater refroze, it produced fractures and structural weakening beneath the crater floor, leading to collapse of the central region and the formation of a circular pit. Continued freezing of the meltwater then caused volumetric expansion—because water expands upon freezing—uplifting the crater's center into an icy dome and transforming the pit into a circular trench. Dome craters of this type generally occur only in craters with diameters greater than approximately 60 kilometres (37 mi).

Other examples of dome craters on Ganymede are Neith and Menhit.

== Exploration ==
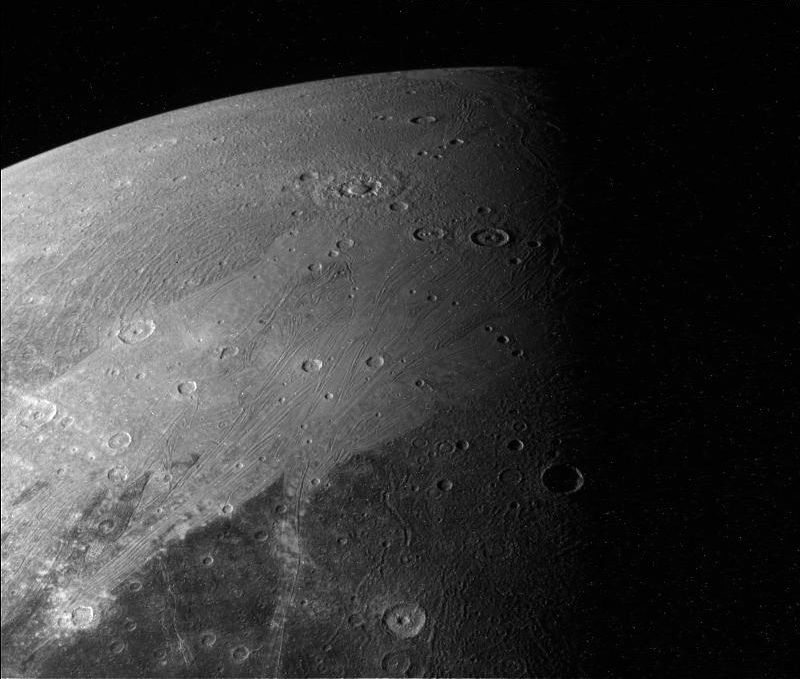
An image of Ganymede showing the northern section of Xibalba Sulcus. The crater Anzu is slightly above the center of the image. This image was taken by Galileo in June 1997.

As of 2026, Galileo is the only spacecraft that has obtained images of Anzu, which it accomplished during its orbit around Jupiter from December 1995 to September 2003, particularly when it flew by Ganymede in June 1997.

=== Future missions ===
The European Space Agency (ESA) space probe Jupiter Icy Moons Explorer (Juice) is scheduled to arrive at Jupiter in July 2031. In July 2034, Juice will settle into a low orbit around Ganymede at an altitude of just 500 kilometres (310 mi). The spacecraft is expected to return higher-resolution close-up images of Anzu crater.

== See also ==
- List of craters on Ganymede
- Meteor
