= Xibalba Sulcus =

Bright region on Ganymede

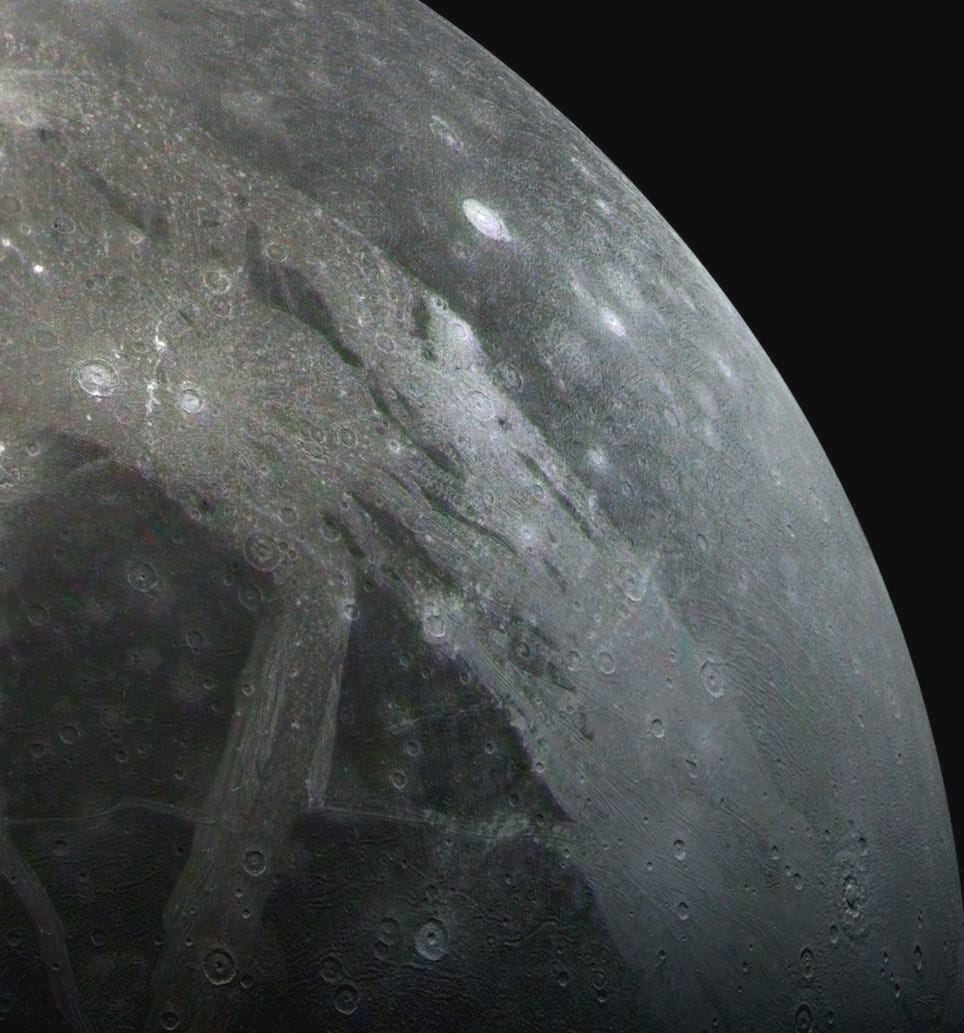
- An image Xibalba Sulcus, taken by the Galileo space probe on 25 June 1997. Galileo Regio and the bright crater Harakhtes are at the top, while Perrine Regio is at the bottom left.
- Feature type: Sulcus
- Location: Ganymede, Jupiter
- Coordinates: 43°00′N 71°06′W
- Length: 2,200 km (1,400 mi)
- Naming: 1997
- Eponym: Xibalba

Xibalba Sulcus is a bright, grooved terrain, or sulcus, on Ganymede, the largest moon of the planet Jupiter.

== Naming ==
Xibalba Sulcus is named after the underworld and the world of dead souls in Maya mythology. Although the International Astronomical Union (IAU) has established a rule that sulci on Ganymede may be named after places from any mythology or culture on Earth, every other sulci on Ganymede besides Xibalba Sulcus is named either after places from Ancient Near Eastern mythologies or after places associated with the Trojan prince Ganymede and his home kingdom of Troy. Xibalba Sulcus does not follow this trend and it is the only named feature on Ganymede whose name derives from Maya mythology.

The IAU approved the name for Xibalba Sulcus in 1997.

== Location ==
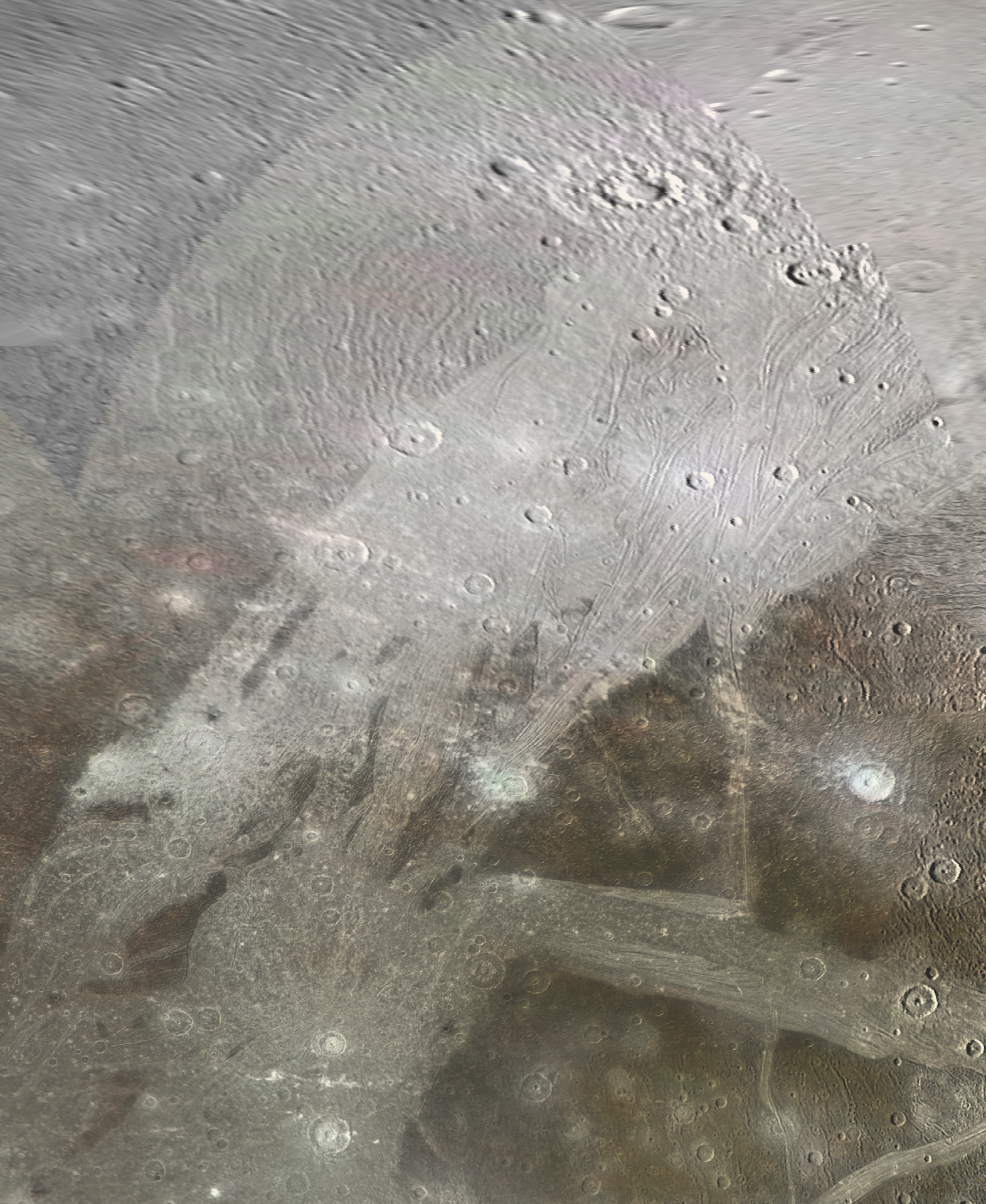
A Mercator projection map of Xibalba Sulcus. The dark region to the upper left is Galileo Regio, while the dark area to the lower right is Perrine Regio.

Xibalba Sulcus is located in the northern hemisphere of Ganymede. It lies between two extensive dark regions on Ganymede: Galileo Regio to the northwest and Perrine Regio to the southeast. The sulcus separates the two regiones. The sulcus then runs from the northeast to the southwest.

To its south is another sulci structure called Babylon Sulci, and it marks the southern terminus of Xibalba Sulcus, while an unnamed sulcus defines its northern and northeastern boundaries. To the southeast, it crosses paths with Nineveh Sulcus.

Xibalba Sulcus hosts a few of craters with names. The crater Ninkasi and the anomalous dome crater Anzu are located in the sulcus's north, while the crater Laomedon is situated near the sulcus's southern boundary.

Xibalba Sulcus is mostly within the Perrine Regio quadrangle of Ganymede (designated Jg2), but its northernmost section is crossing over into the Etana quadrangle (designated Jg1).

Because Ganymede is in synchronous rotation as it orbits Jupiter, one hemisphere of the moon always faces its parent planet, while the opposite hemisphere never does. Xibalba Sulcus is mostly located on the hemisphere that permanently faces Jupiter. As a result, an observer within most of Xibalba Sulcus would see Jupiter fixed in the same position in the sky at all times. The westernmost portions of the sulcus, however, are situated on the hemisphere that never faces Jupiter, so Jupiter would gradually sink below the horizon as an observer reaches Xibalba Sulcus's westernmost extent. (Note: For moons in synchronous rotation, such as Ganymede, 0° longitude corresponds to the part of the surface that always faces Jupiter. Regions between 270° W to 0° to 90° W longitude always face the moon's parent planet.)

== Geography ==
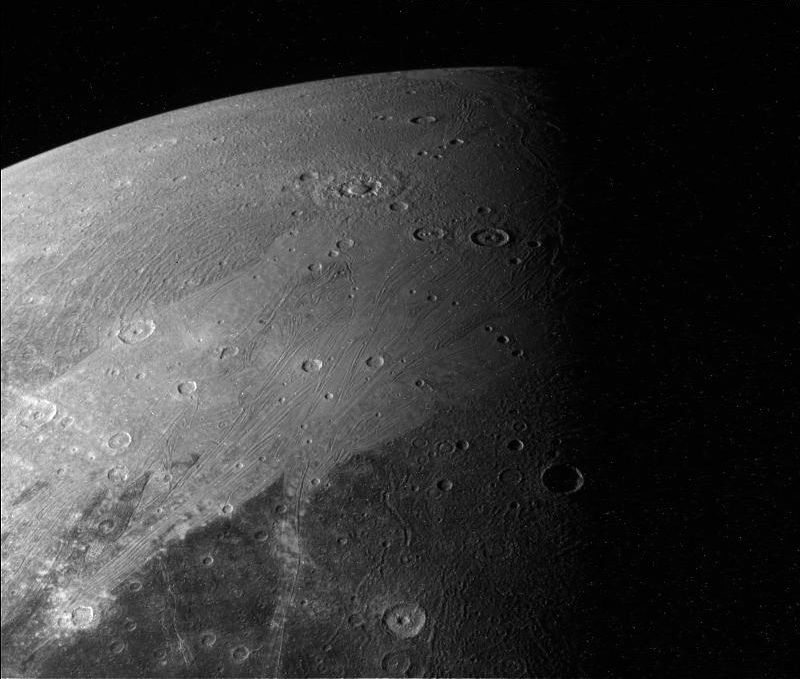
An image of the northern section of Xibalba Sulcus, taken by Galileo in June 1997. The dome crater near the top of Ganymede is Anzu.

Xibalba Sulcus is approximately 2,200 kilometres (1,400 mi) long. Like most bright, grooved terrains on Ganymede, Xibalba Sulci is a relatively young terrain distinguished by multiple generations of nearly-parallel ridges and grooves. Bright, grooved terrains on Ganymede are widely interpreted as having formed after the moon's older, dark, heavily cratered terrains.

Most bright terrains are thought to have originated from the upwelling of relatively clean, fresh water ice from beneath Ganymede's crust. In the process, they erased, smoothed out, and overprinted the moon's dark regions. These fresh ices reflect a large proportion of incoming sunlight, giving Xibalba Sulci a higher albedo than surrounding dark regions as the sulcus reflects more incoming sunlight. This ongoing process of resurfacing of ancient terrain through tectonic activity is common on Ganymede and plays a huge role in determining the moon's appearance and shaping its surface. In the case of Xibalba Sulcus, it overprinted the surfaces of the older Galileo Regio and Perrine Regio.

In terms of relative age, Ganymede's bright terrains are broadly comparable to the dark lunar maria on the Earth's Moon, as both represent the youngest major surface units on their respective bodies. On the Moon, these younger surfaces consist of dark basalt lava flows, whereas on Ganymede, bright water ice plays an analogous role. By contrast, Ganymede's dark terrains are more comparable to the Moon's bright Lunar highlands, which are older than the lunar maria.

== Topography ==
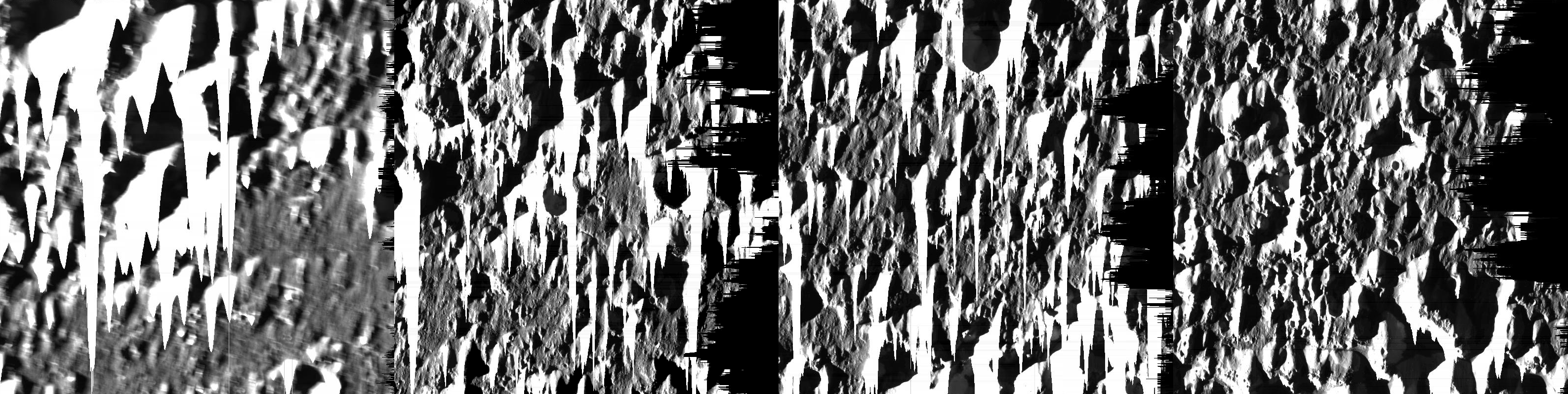
An extremely high-resolution mosaic image of Xibalba Sulcus, taken by Galileo in June 1996. Unfortunately, the images were afflicted with an excessive amount of bleeding, a phenomenon due to overexposure and saturation.

Although Xibalba Sulcus is relatively smoother than the more rugged, ancient dark terrains on Ganymede, super-high-resolution images reveal that its western sections are more rugged than other sulci of the same age. The western parts of Xibalba Sulcus also lack the characteristic grooved terrain found in other Ganymedean bright terrains. Instead, this area of Xibalba Sulcus is dominated by rounded, broken hills and impact craters, causing it to resemble Ganymede's dark terrain a bit more than the moon's bright terrain.

The eastern part of Xibalba Sulcus, on the other hand, more closely resembles other bright, grooved terrains on Ganymede because it has densely packed, well-defined grooves. Overall, Xibalba Sulcus does not resemble most other sulci on Ganymede, sharing only a few similarities with Uruk Sulcus in terms of ridge and trough orientations. Instead, its overall appearance most closely matches boundary-type bright terrain, especially Philae Sulcus, where bright and dark terrains meet.

The surface of Xibalba Sulcus shows signs that it has been heavily broken down into a loose, fragmental layer called a regolith. This reworking appears to result from several geological processes. Tectonic activity is evident from the way the massifs are aligned and from the large grooves cutting through the area, showing that the surface was strongly shaped by crustal movement. Impact processes have contributed to surface reworking as well, as ejecta from nearby fresh craters appears to have blanketed portions of the region. Mass wasting events are inferred from the accumulation of smoother material in low-lying areas, likely transported downslope from adjacent elevated terrain.

Localized geological processes continue to influence the terrain. The accumulation of boulders at the bases of massifs may result from the preferential removal of finer material through sublimation or the downslope movement of debris. Crater morphology, including preferentially eroded north–south rims and lineaments within craters, further indicates that tectonic activity has modified the landscape at small scales. These observations suggest that post-formation tectonic and regolith processes have contributed to the present-day morphology of Xibalba Sulcus.

== Potential Minor Cryovolcanism ==
Although Xibalba Sulcus resembles regions previously interpreted as cryovolcanic, high-resolution imagery reveals no direct evidence of recent cryovolcanic activity within the G1 image footprint. Cryovolcanism may have contributed to the initial emplacement of high-albedo ice but does not appear to have been a dominant process in the recent geological history of the western part of Xibalba Sulcus. Morphologically, the terrain differs from areas considered prime candidates for cryovolcanism, such as Nippur Sulcus and Sippar Sulcus.

== Exploration ==
Xibalba Sulcus was first explored and imaged by the spacecraft Voyager 1 and Voyager 2 during their brief flybys of Ganymede in March and July 1979, respectively. Unfortunately, the sulcus was located near the limb of the moon during both flybys, and little detail could be discerned in the images.

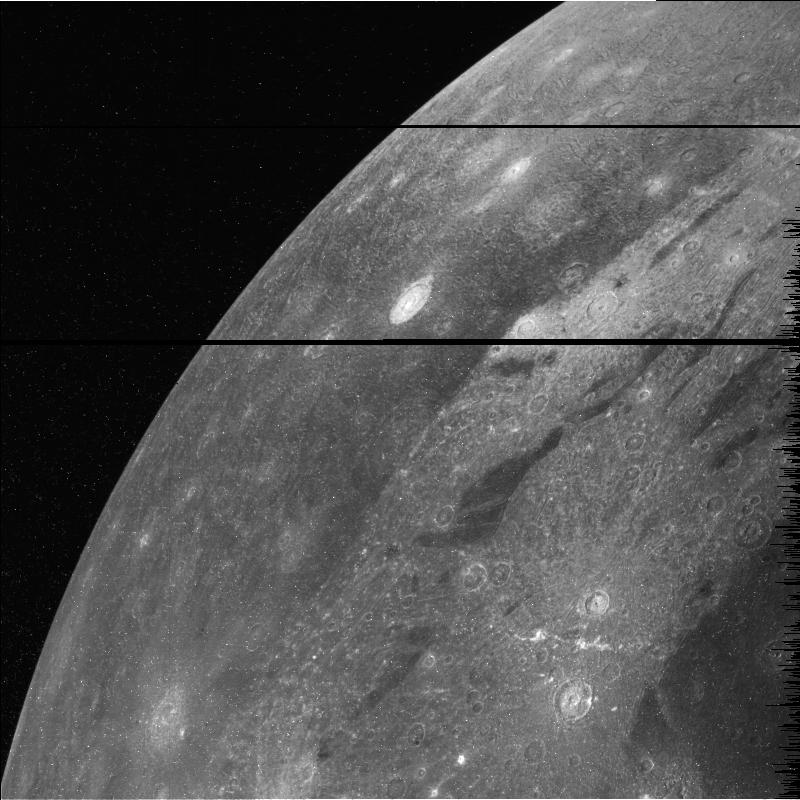
The southern part of Xibalba Sulcus as imaged by Galileo in June 1997. The bright crater slightly above the center is Harakhtes.

The next probe to visit Jupiter and Ganymede was Galileo, which orbited around Jupiter from December 1995 to September 2003. Galileo provided the first close-up images of Xibalba Sulcus in June 1996, allowing it to resolve details as small as 11 m (36 ft) per pixel. Unfortunately, all the images suffered from significant image bleeding resulting from overexposure and saturation. Galileo was able to visit Xibalba Sulcus again in May and June 1997 during its G8 and C9 orbits, respectively, but it flew by Ganymede from a much greater distance than during its 1996 visit.

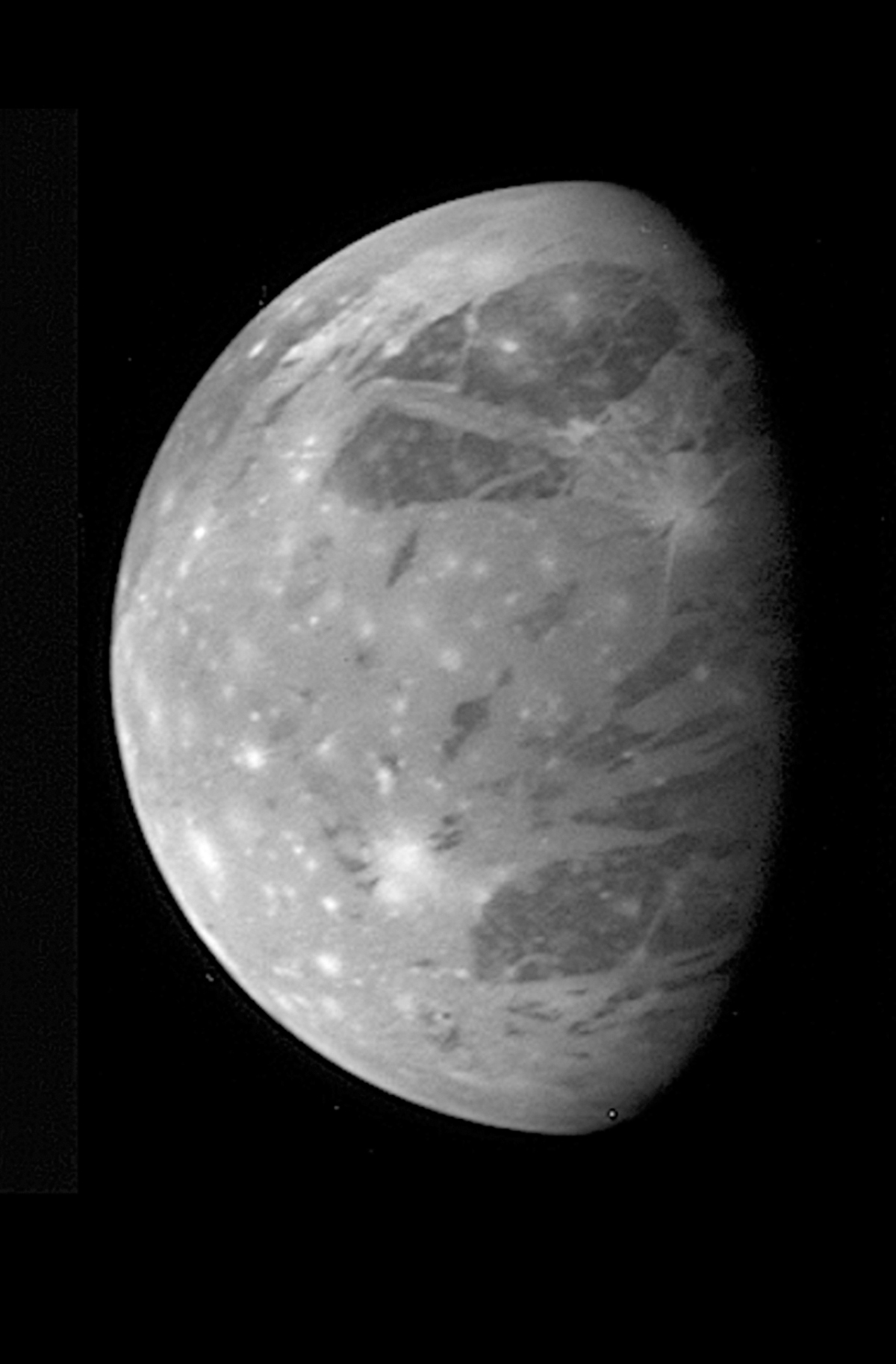
An image of Ganymede, showing Xibalba Sulcus at the upper left of the moon's disc. This image was taken by the New Horizons probe in February 2007.

The next probe to observe Xibalba Sulcus was New Horizons, which flew past Jupiter and Ganymede for a gravity assist in February 2007, enabling the spacecraft to reach Pluto more quickly. Xibalba Sulcus appeared in New Horizons' images despite the probe being more than 3,000,000 km (1,900,000 mi) away from Ganymede during the flyby.

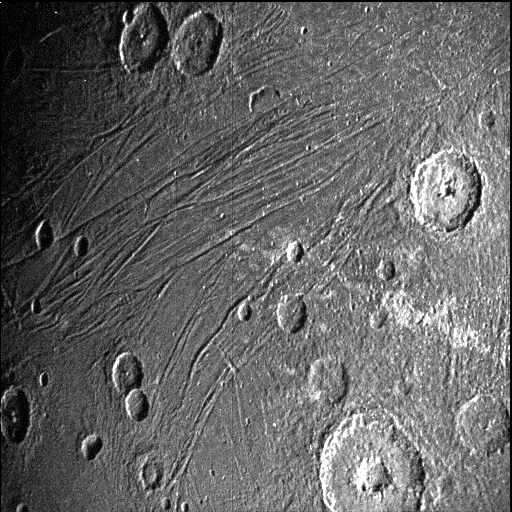
A high-resolution image of Xibalba Sulcus and Laomedon crater (slightly above the right), taken by the Juno spacecraft in June 2021.

The most recent probe to image Xibalba Sulcus was Juno, which flew past Ganymede in June 2021 during the spacecraft's 34th perijove, its closest approach to Jupiter. Although Xibalba Sulcus was on Ganymede's night side during Juno's flyby, the spacecraft was, impressively, still able to image the sulcus clearly using sunlight reflected from Jupiter alone, captured by its low-light-sensitive Stellar Reference Unit (SRU) navigation camera.

As of 2026, the images returned by Juno provide the clearest overall views of Xibalba Sulcus, although the Galileo mission still achieved higher spatial resolution in terms of meters per pixel.

=== Future Missions ===
The European Space Agency's (ESA) space probe called the Jupiter Icy Moons Explorer (Juice) was launched in April 2023 is currently on its way to Jupiter. The probe will arrive at Jupiter in July 2031 and, in 2034, after spending three and a half years in orbit around Jupiter and performing multiple flybys of Europa, Ganymede and Callisto, it is expected that Juice will settle into a low polar orbit around Ganymede at a distance of just 500 kilometres (310 mi) Juice's high-resolution images of Xibalba Sulcus is expected to surpass the quality of the images of both Galileo and Juno.

== Gallery ==
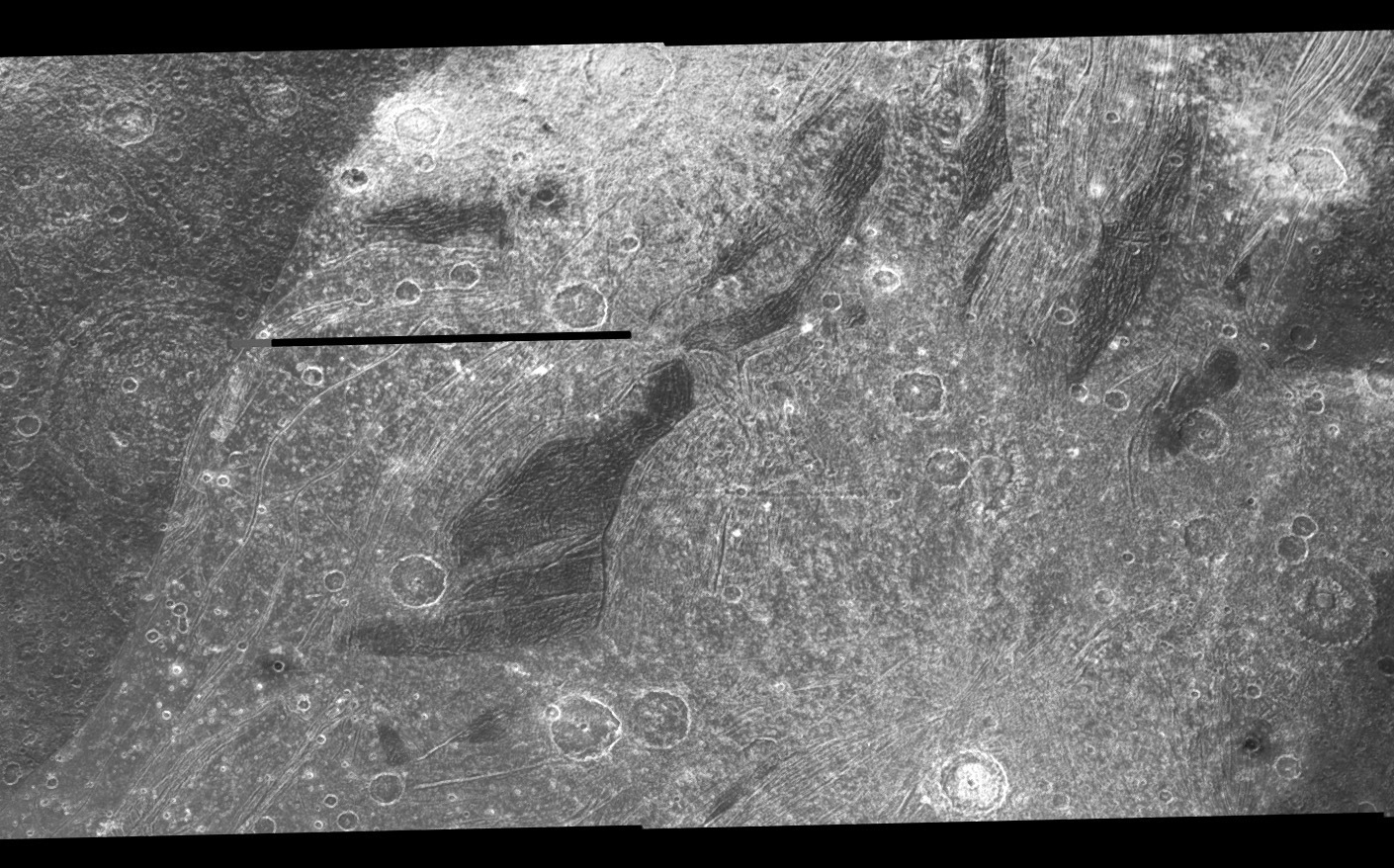
A medium-resolution map of the middle section of Xibalba Sulcus. The circular patch and dark area to the left are Bigeh Facula and Galileo Regio, respectively.

== See also ==
- Sulcus (geology)
- Ganymede (moon)
