= Thot =

Thot may refer to:

- Duckie Thot (born 1995), Australian model
- Nim Thot, Cambodian politician
- Thốt Nốt district, in Vietnam
- a subgroup of the fictional Breen in Star Trek

== See also ==
- Thoth (disambiguation)
- Thot Shit, a 2021 song
