= Harakhtes (crater) =

Crater on Ganymede

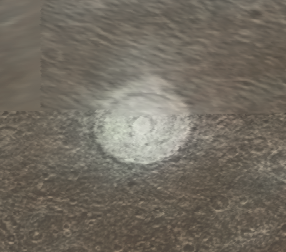
- An image of Harakhtes crater
- Feature type: Bright floor dome crater
- Coordinates: 35.95°N 100.26°W
- Diameter: 108 kilometres (67 mi)
- Eponym: Horakhty

Harakhtes is a major crater on Ganymede, the largest moon of Jupiter. It is a bright dome crater located in the northern part of Ganymede's leading hemisphere. The crater is 108 kilometres (67 mi) in diameter.

== Naming ==
Harakhtes is named after Horakhty, one of the many forms of Horus, the national god of the Ancient Egyptians who was believed to grant pharaohs the authority to rule Egypt. The pharaohs of Egypt believed that they are living incarnations of Horus. During Ancient Egypt's 3,100-year history, Horus underwent several transformations and changes in identity. Horakhty (literally "Horus of the Horizon") is a form of Horus that represents the eastern horizon, where the Sun rises. Some Ancient Egyptians believed that the Sun rose into the sky at dawn through a gateway located on the eastern horizon.

The International Astronomical Union (IAU) has ruled that craters on Ganymede, including Harakhtes, are to be named after deities, heroes, or places from ancient Middle Eastern mythologies, including Egyptian mythology.

The IAU approved the name Harakhtes in 2000.

== Location ==
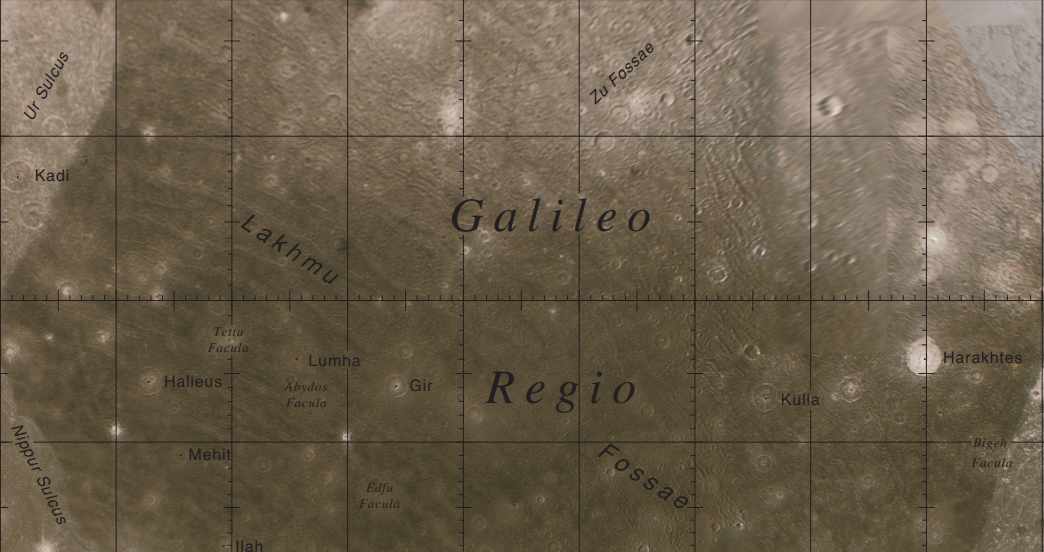
A map of Ganymede's Galileo Regio quadrangle, showing Harakhtes on the right side of the map.

Harakhtes is located in the mid-latitudes of Ganymede's northern hemisphere and on the moon's leading hemisphere. It lies at the eastern edge of Galileo Regio, a vast, roughly oval-shaped region of rugged terrain that is among the oldest surface features on Ganymede. In contrast to the ancient, heavily cratered terrain of Galileo Regio, the younger and brighter Xibalba Sulcus lies immediately to the east of Harakhtes.

The region surrounding Harakhtes is saturated with impact craters and palimpsests (ancient impact structures whose topographic relief has largely been erased by tectonic activities) since Galileo Regio contains some of the oldest terrain on Ganymede. Some of the major impact features surrounding Harakhtes include the Kulla crater to the west and the Bigeh Facula palimpsest to the southeast.

Harakhtes is located within the same quadrangle as Galileo Regio (designated Jg3). The crater is situated on the hemisphere of Ganymede that permanently faces away from Jupiter. This situation is caused by Ganymede's synchronous rotation, which keeps the same hemisphere facing Jupiter as the moon orbits the planet. As a result, an observer at Harakhtes would never see Jupiter above the horizon. (Note: For moons in synchronous rotation, such as Ganymede, 0° longitude corresponds to the part of the surface that always faces Jupiter. Regions between 90° W and 270° W longitude never face the moon's parent planet.)

== Coloration ==
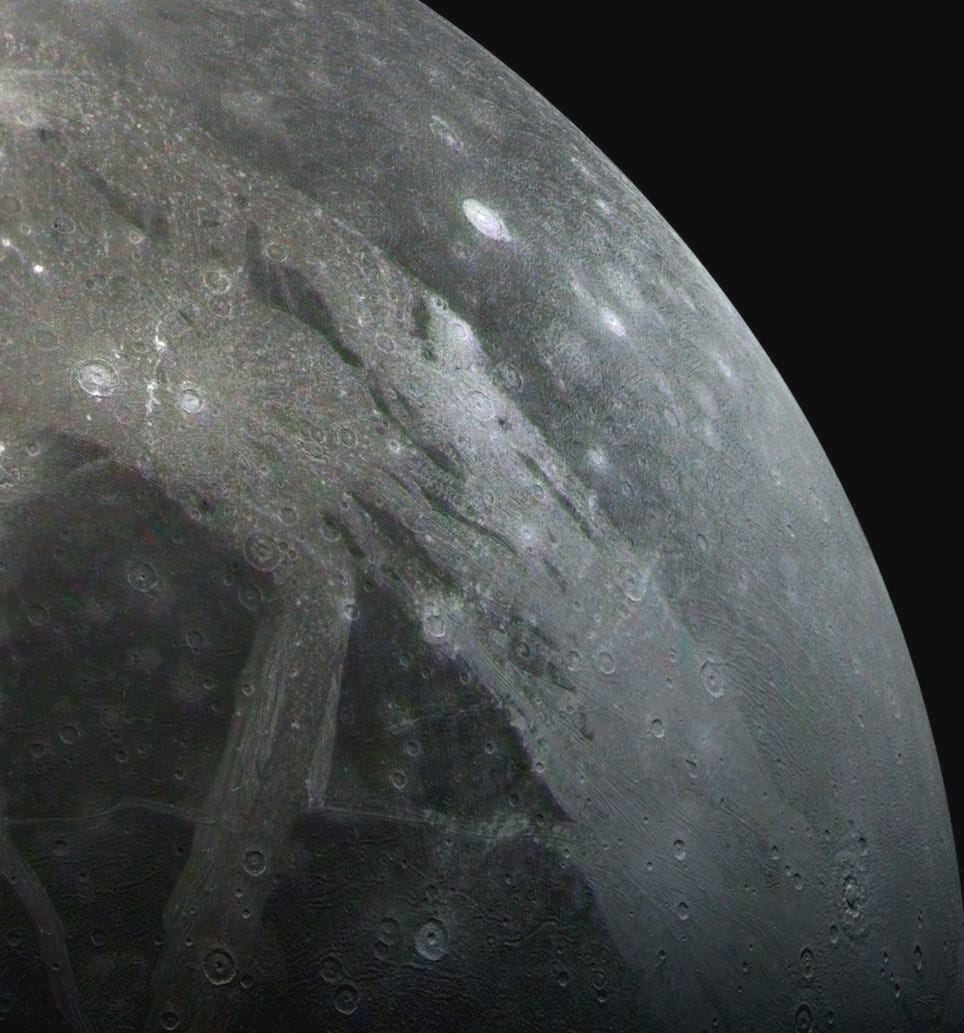
Harakhtes crater (slightly above from the center), and Xibalba Sulcus.

Harakhtes is a crater with a very bright floor. Its brightness is in stark contrast to the dark, ancient terrain of Galileo Regio that surrounds it. However, it does not possess any bright rays despite its bright floor. This is similar to the case of the crater chain Enki Catena, where craters that formed on Ganymede's bright terrain have bright rays, whereas those that formed on its dark terrain lack rays. Based on observations of Enki Catena as an example, this may be because the impact that created Harakhtes excavated and mixed dark material into the surrounding ejecta, making the resulting deposits difficult to distinguish from the dark background.

== Morphology ==
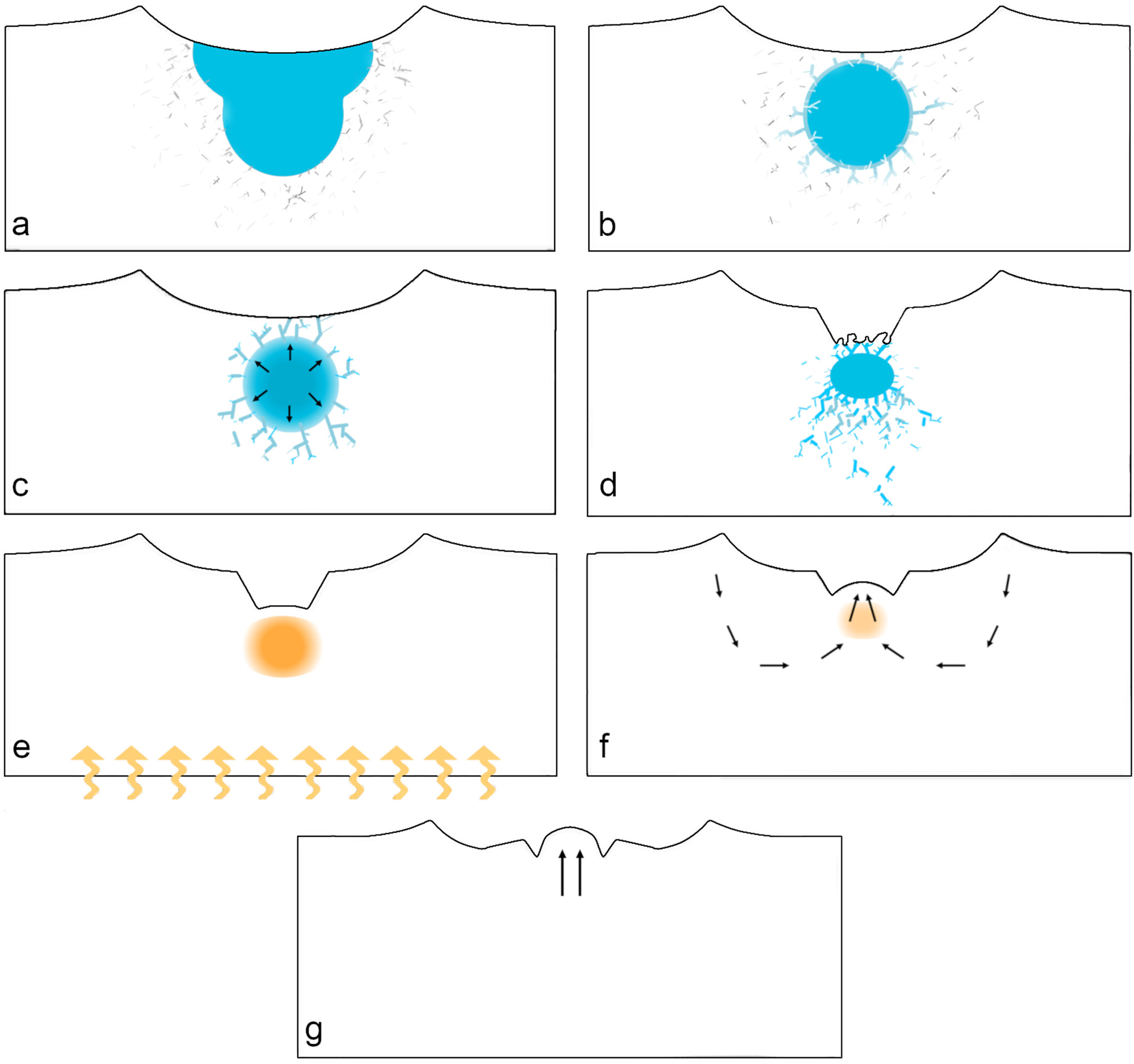
A diagram showing the steps in the formation of dome craters on icy moons. It shows how the refreezing of meltwater from meteorite impacts can cause both the formation of sinkholes and the dome-forming expansion of an icy crust.

Like many other craters on the surfaces of icy moons, and unlike most craters on rocky bodies such as the Moon, Harakhtes has a central dome. According to studies, such domes form when heat generated by an asteroid impact melts subsurface ice beneath the crater floor. As the meltwater refreezes, it expands—because water expands upon freezing—fracturing the crater floor and causing a central pit to form, similar to a sinkhole. If meltwater remains beneath the crater floor, continued freezing and expansion can gradually uplift the pit into a dome, producing dome craters such as Osiris and Hershef.

== Exploration ==
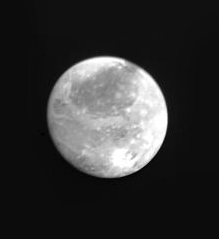
A distant image of Ganymede, taken by Voyager 1 in February 1979. Harakhtes is the bright oval on the upper side of the Moon.

Although Voyager 1 was able to image Harakhtes for the first time in history in February 1979, it did so from a great distance of several million kilometers, preventing the probe from obtaining clear images.

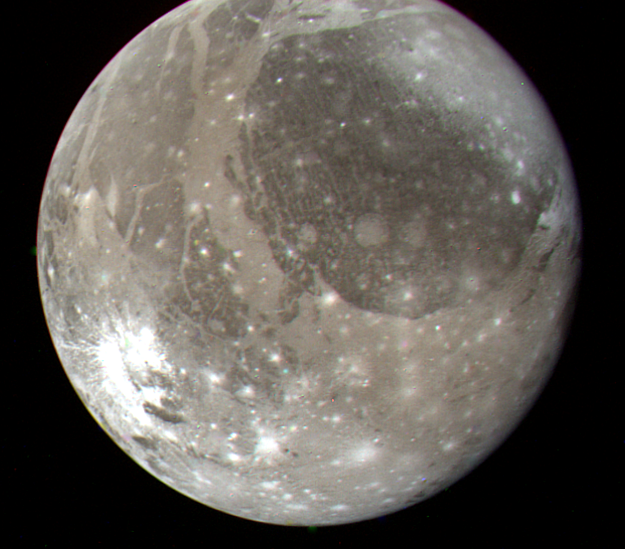
A mosaic image of Ganymede, taken by Voyager 2 in July 1979. Harakhtes is the bright crater to the right.

Voyager 2 was the first spacecraft to send back clear images of Harakhtes when it flew by Jupiter in July 1979. The bright crater was near the eastern limb of Ganymede during this flyby.

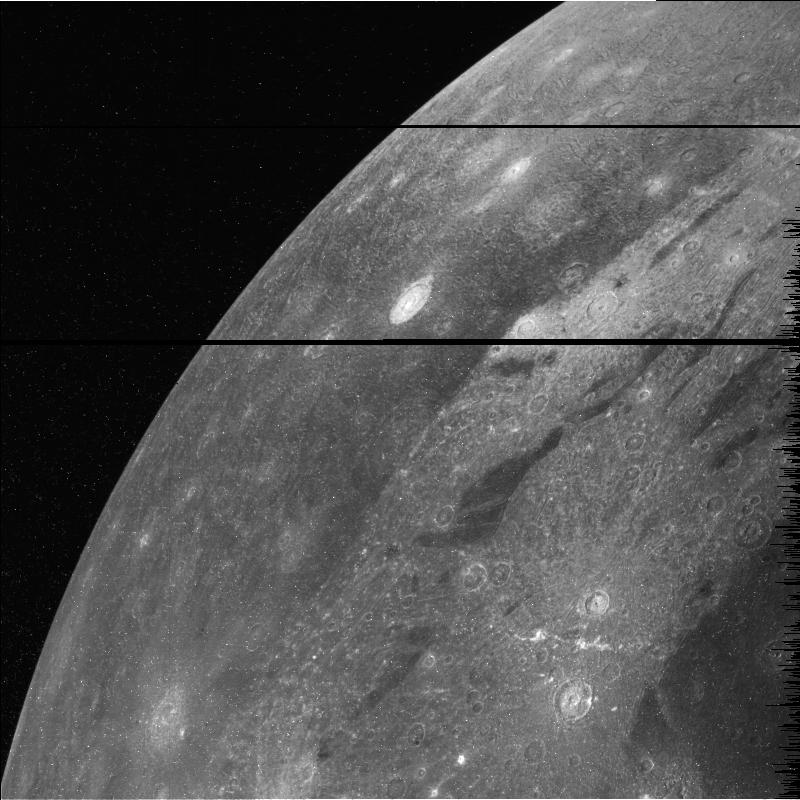
An image of Harakhtes crater (slightly above from the center), taken by Galileo in June 1997

Galileo became the next probe to study Ganymede when it orbited Jupiter from December 1995 to September 2003. It was able to fly near Harakhtes in June 1997 as it flew above the nearby Xibalba Sulcus. To date, Galileo's images are the best available images of Harakhtes crater.

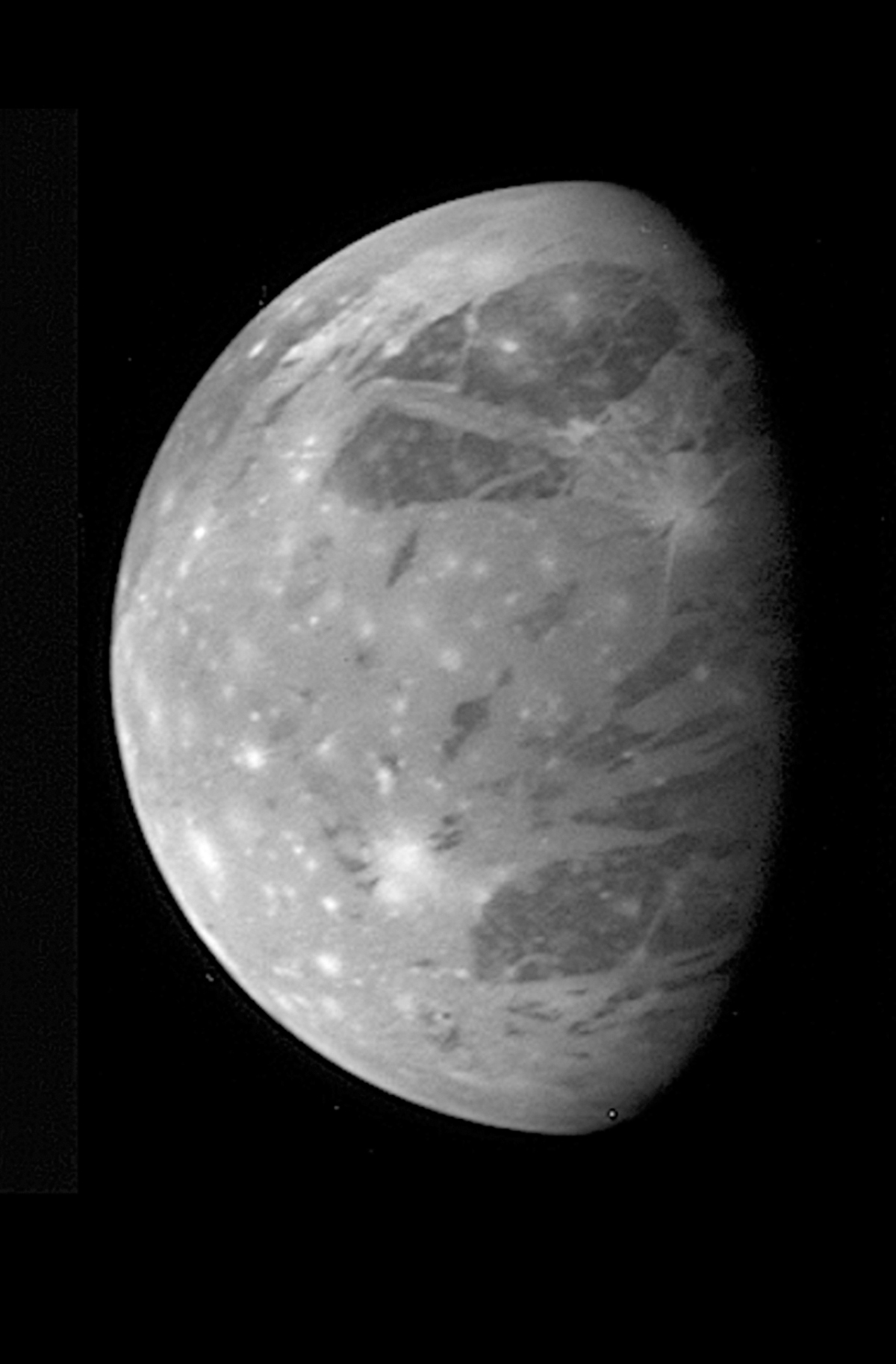
Harakhtes crater appears near the upper left edge of Ganymede in this image taken by the New Horizons spacecraft in February 2007.

The most recent spacecraft to image Harakhtes was New Horizons, which flew past Ganymede at a distance of 3,500,000 kilometres (2,200,000 mi) in February 2007. Although the spacecraft was too far away to resolve any meaningful details of the crater, the sharp contrast between Harakhtes and the dark terrain of Galileo Regio made it appear highly conspicuous in the images. During the flyby, Harakhtes was located near Ganymede's western limb.

=== Future exploration ===
The European Space Agency's (ESA) Jupiter Icy Moons Explorer (Juice) will arrive at Jupiter in July 2031. After spending about three and a half years orbiting Jupiter and conducting multiple flybys of the icy Jovian moons Europa, Callisto, and Ganymede, Juice will enter a low polar orbit around Ganymede at an altitude of 500 kilometres (310 mi). From this orbit, the spacecraft is expected to obtain images of Harakhtes at a much higher resolution than ever before.

== See also ==
- List of craters on Ganymede
- Meteor
