= Menhit (crater) =

Crater on Ganymede

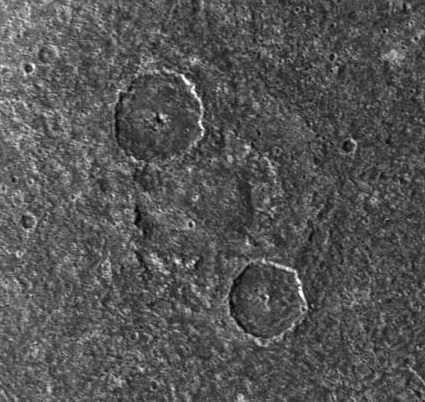
- An image of Menhit crater, taken by Voyager 2 on 9 July 1979.
- Feature type: Dome crater
- Coordinates: 36.31°S 140.32°W
- Diameter: 140 kilometres (87 mi)
- Eponym: Menhit

Menhit is an impact crater on Ganymede, the largest moon of planet Jupiter. Although it is a relatively wide crater, with a diameter of 140 kilometres (87 mi), much of its structure has already been degraded and erased. Menhit exhibits a wide central dome that is commonplace among craters on Ganymede, and it has been partly obscured by two unnamed craters.

== Naming ==
Menhit is named after a lion-headed goddess of war who is believed to have originated in Nubian mythology – from a region called Nubia that is now part of modern-day Sudan. Menhit later became part of Egyptian mythology through thousands of years of close contact between Egypt and Nubia.

Menhit's name was approved by the International Astronomical Union (IAU) in accordance with the convention stipulating that craters on Ganymede are to be named after deities, heroes, or places from ancient Middle Eastern mythology, including Egyptian and Nubian mythologies. The name for Menhit was approved by the IAU in 2006.

Another crater on Ganymede, called Mehit, has a name that can easily be confused with Menhit.

== Location ==
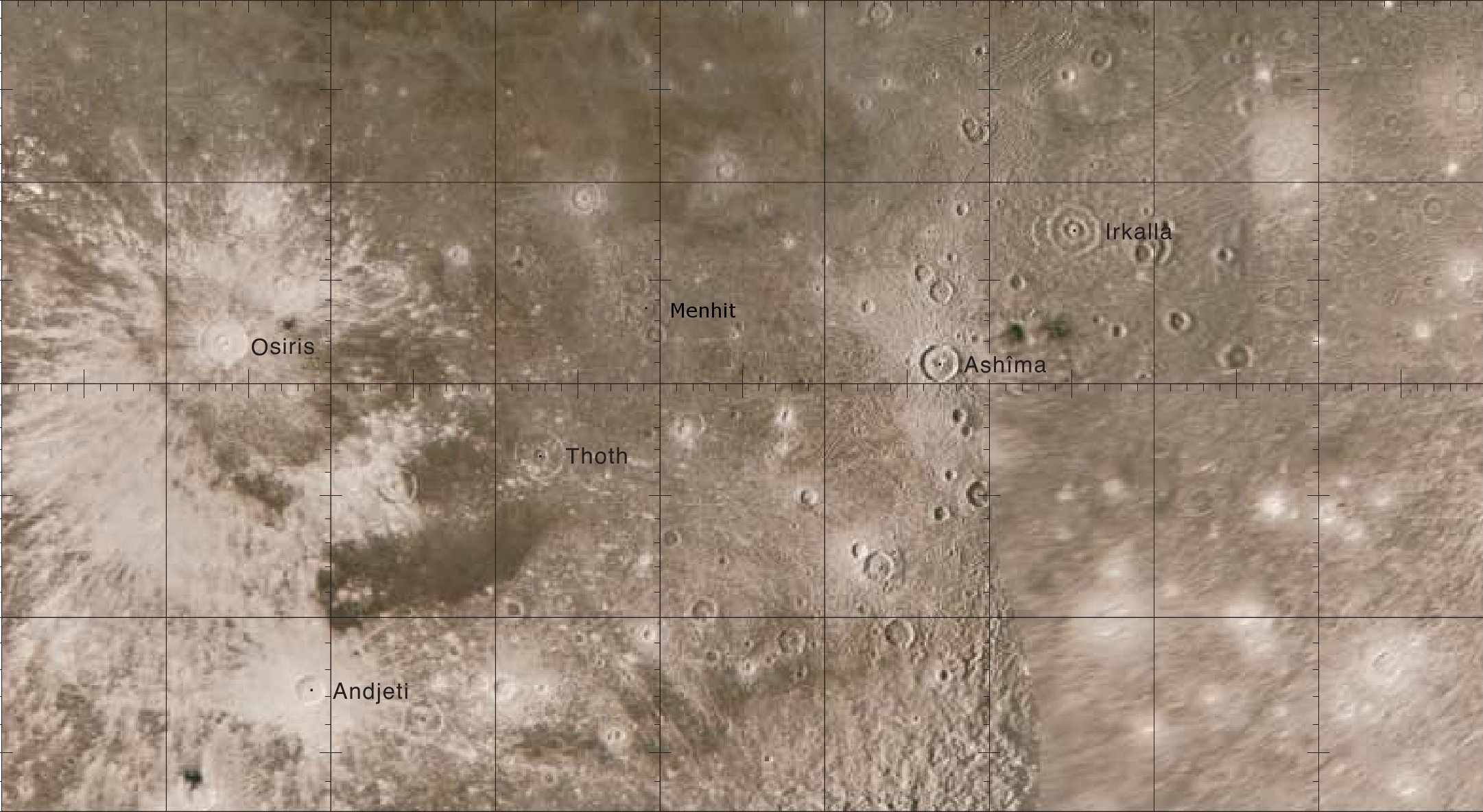
A map of the Osiris quadrangle where Menhit is located.

Menhit crater is located within an unnamed, bright terrain on Ganymede. It is situated to the southeast of the terminus of the bright terrain Sippar Sulcus.

To Menhit's west lies a prominent ray crater named Osiris, while to its southwest lies the crater Thoth. To its south is the surface depression Yaroun Patera, and to the east are two other craters, Ashîma and Irkalla.

Menhit is located within of the Osiris quadrangle (or section) of Ganymede (designated Jg12).

Menhit is located on the hemisphere of Ganymede that always faces away from Jupiter. Because of the moon's synchronous rotation during its orbit, one hemisphere of Ganymede always points towards Jupiter while the opposite hemisphere never does. Therefore, an observer at Menhit would never see Jupiter in the sky. (Note: For moons in synchronous rotation, such as Ganymede, 0° longitude corresponds to the part of the surface that always faces Jupiter. Regions between 90° W and 270° W longitude never face the moon’s parent planet.)

== Morphology and Formation ==
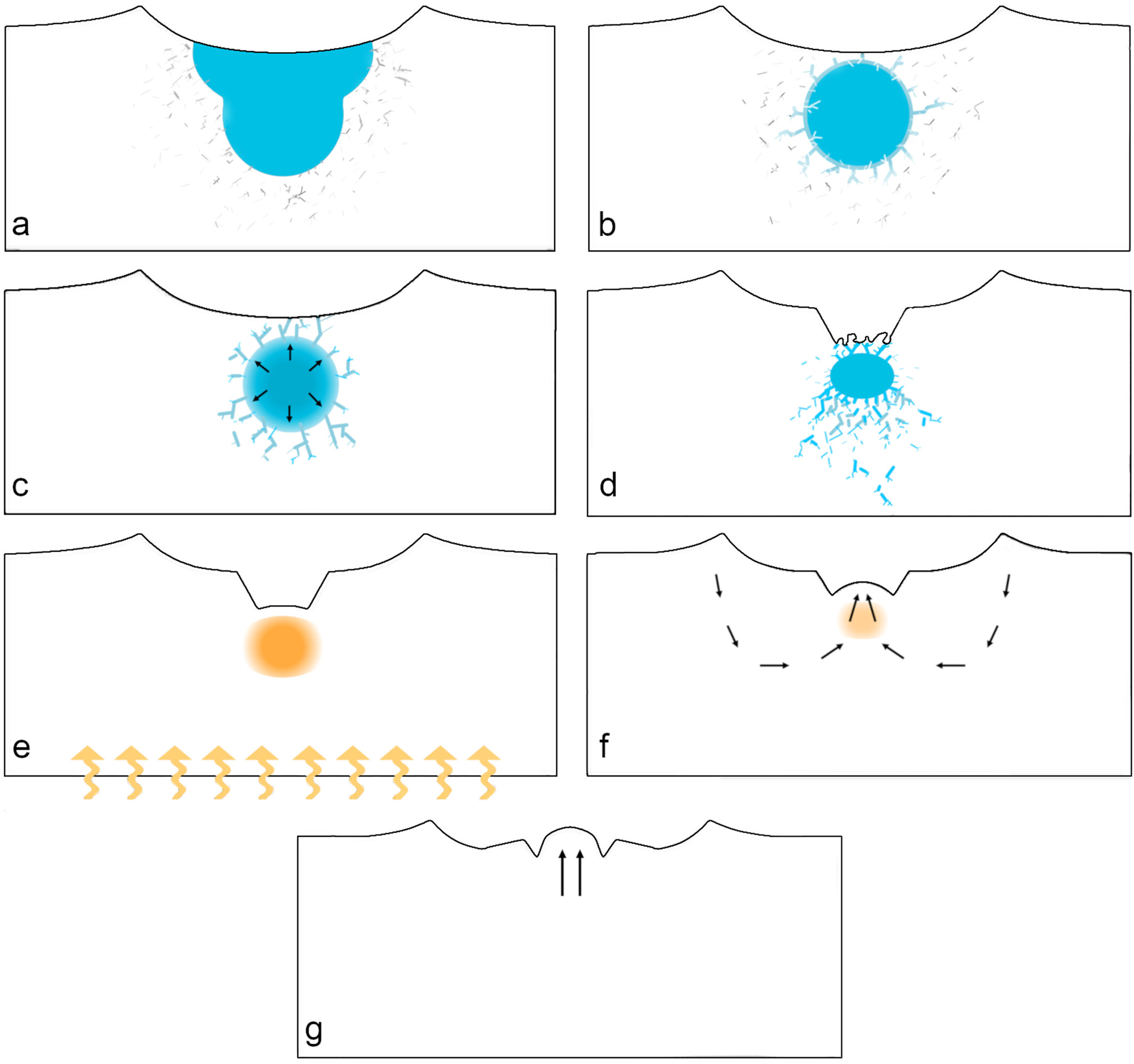
A diagram showing the steps in the formation of dome craters on icy moons. It shows how the refreezing of meltwater from meteorite impacts can cause both the formation of sinkholes and the dome-forming expansion of an icy crust.

Menhit is probably a very old crater, based on how much of its original structure has already disappeared. All that is left of its original crater rim are concentric zones of broken massifs and ridges surrounding the central dome. According to a study conducted by Caussi, Dombard, Korycansky, White, Moore and Schenk, dome craters on Ganymede form when meltwater develops beneath craters after an asteroid or comet impacts the moon's surface, causing the impact site to heat up greatly. As the underground meltwater subsequently refreezes – and since water ice expands when it freezes – it damages the crater's floor, causing a central pit to appear, similar to how sinkholes develop.

As more time passes, the meltwater continues to expand as additional portions freeze, pushing the crater floor upward and forming the distinctive dome found in many of Ganymede's craters. Eventually, the dome expands to such an extent that it effectively covers most or all of the crater. This results in the gradual erasure of the crater as it is consumed by the dome. Domes usually only form if a crater is more than 60 kilometers in diameter.

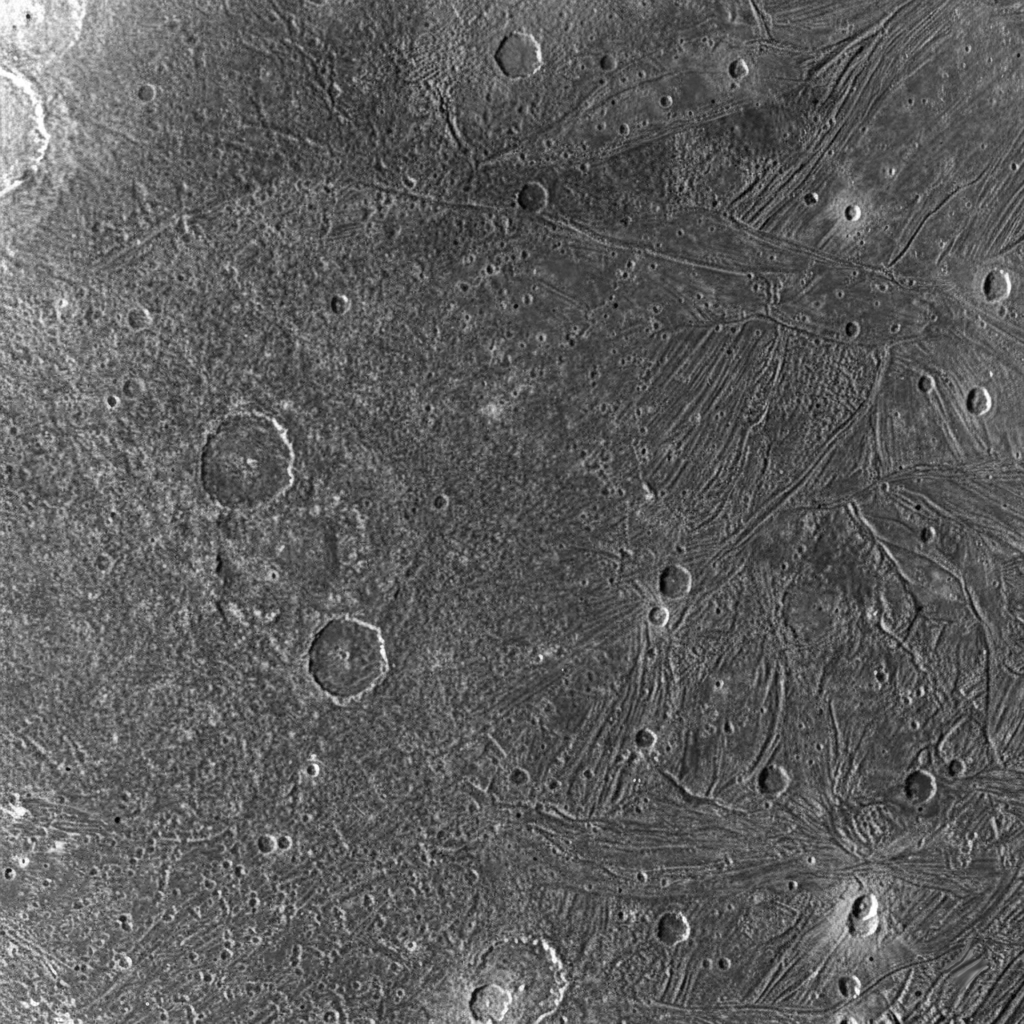
An image of Menhit crater (left), taken by Voyager 2 in July 1979

The terrain surrounding Menhit rises approximately 500 metres (1,600 ft) above the surrounding plains. This system is considered very unusual, as the floors of impact craters are normally at or below the elevation of the surrounding surface. The exact cause of this formation is not yet known.

Another dome crater that is comparable to Menhit in terms of age and stage of formation is Neith which is located on the opposite side of Ganymede.

Two pit craters of similar size overlap Menhit's rim on its northwest and southeast, almost perfectly diametrically opposite each other with respect to Menhit.

== Exploration ==
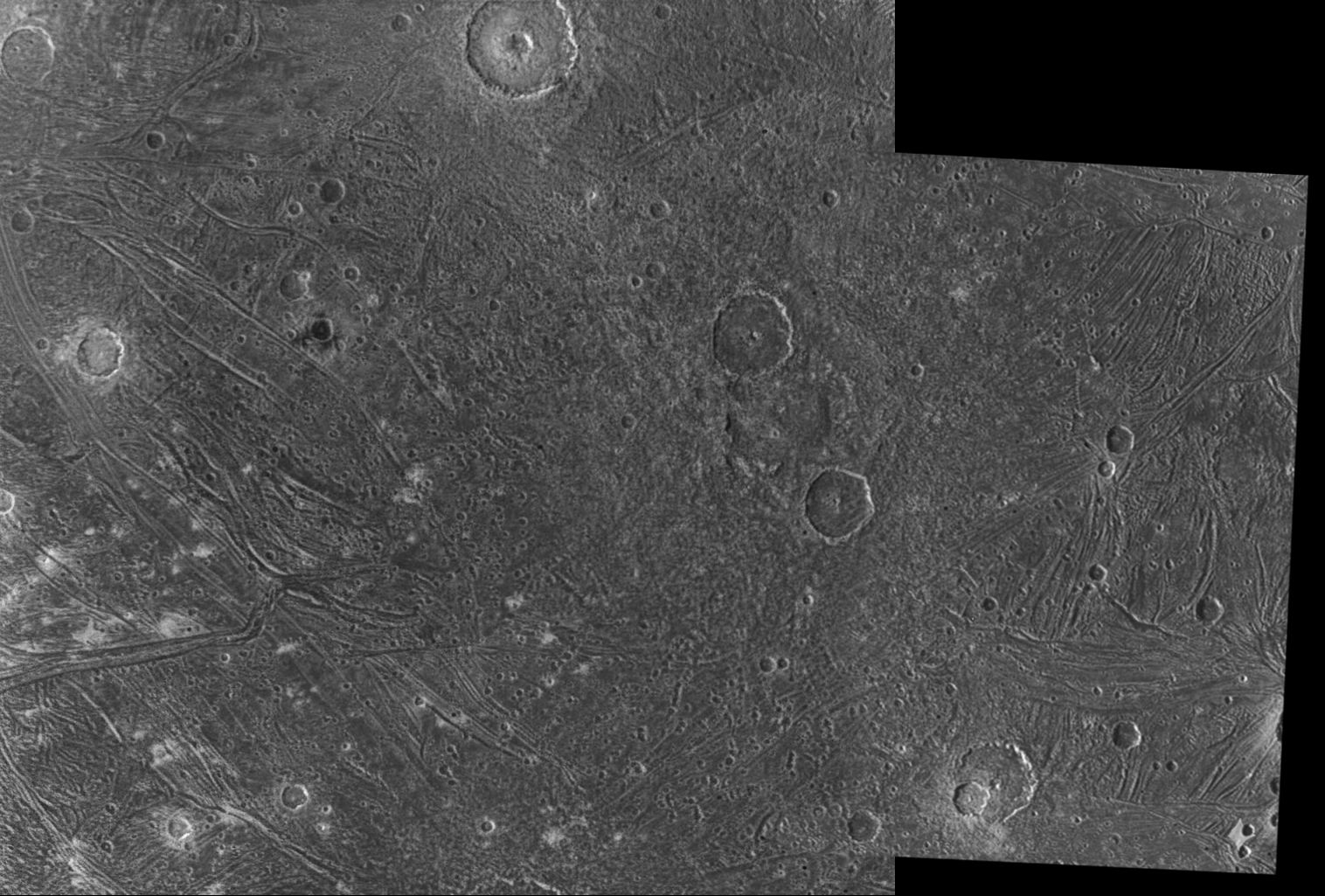
A photomosaic image of Menhit crater and its surroundings, taken by Voyager 2 in July 1979.

As of 2026, Voyager 2 is the only space probe to have imaged Menhit crater up close.

Voyager 2 arrived at Jupiter in July 1979. During its brief flyby of Ganymede, it was able to capture high-resolution images of the southern hemisphere of the moon's anti-Jovian side (i.e., the side of Ganymede that never faces Jupiter). This area included Menhit, and the crater was clearly visible when the spacecraft photographed the area.

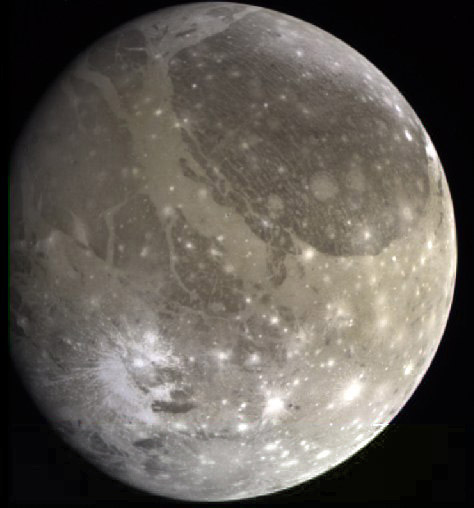
A global image of Ganymede, barely showing the degraded Menhit crater (located about halfway from the center toward the bottom edge of the moon), taken by Galileo in June 1996.

Although Galileo captured close-up images of areas near Menhit during its multiple flybys of Ganymede from 1995 to 2003, no close-up images of Menhit itself exist in Galileo's imagery database. Galileo only managed to image Menhit from a distance, such as during its flyby of Ganymede in June 1996.

=== Future Missions ===
The European Space Agency's (ESA) Jupiter Icy Moons Explorer (Juice) is scheduled to arrive at Jupiter in July 2031. After spending three and a half years orbiting Jupiter and performing several flybys of Europa, Ganymede, and Callisto, in 2034, Juice will settle into a low orbit around Ganymede at a distance of just 500 kilometres (310 mi). Juice is expected to obtain the first close-up images of Menhit, which can help planetary scientists better understand the nature and formation of dome craters on icy moons like Ganymede.

== See also ==
- List of craters on Ganymede
- Meteor
