= Thought (sculpture) =

Coordinates: 55°43′28″N 37°33′22″E

- Мысль
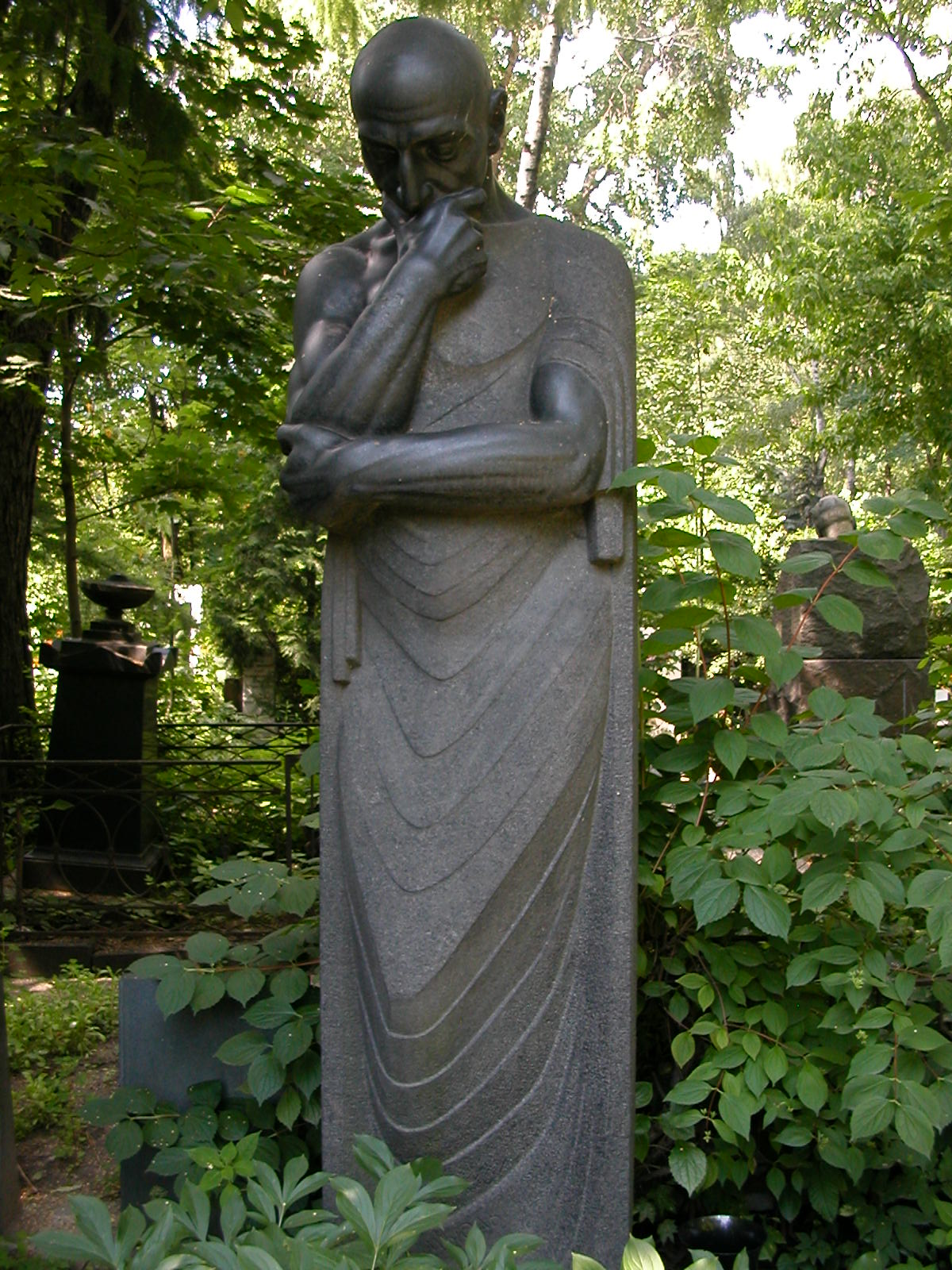
- Location: Novodevichye Cemetery, Moscow
- Designer: Sergey Merkurov
- Opening date: 1911–13

Thought (Russian: Мысль) is a sculpture made by S. D. Merkurov in 1911–1913 (gabbro, porphyry). In 1955 it was installed on Merkurov's grave at the Novodevichy Cemetery.

== History and description ==
On the sculpture Thought S. D. Merkurov worked in 1911–1913 in his workshop on Tsvetnoy Boulevard. It was created as the central element of the triptych, the extreme figures of which were a monument to F. M. Dostoyevsky and a monument to Leo Tolstoy, made at the same time.

In 1918, Thought was purchased from the sculptor and installed at the entrance to Tsvetnoy Boulevard from Trubnaya Square in the framework of the Leninist plan for monumental propaganda. In 1936, in connection with the reconstruction of the boulevard, the sculpture was moved to Povarskaya Street (then Vorovsky Street) to the Rostov House, where the Union of Writers of the USSR was located. In 1955, the sculpture was transferred to the Novodevichy cemetery at the grave of its author S. D. Merkurov (site number 2).

The monument was made in the style typical of the pre-revolutionary works of Merkurov. The statue is made of a large piece of black granite. The sculptor was clearly inspired by Rodin's The Thinker. Merkurov portrayed a man in full growth in the characteristic pose of The Thinker. The lower part of the face is covered with a hand, the bald head is tilted forward. At his feet are the circular folds of the garment, which resembles the vestments of the eastern priests.

Art historian N. D. Sobolevsky in 1947 noted: "Static, stiffness figures get on in sculpture with a bold realistic interpretation of the head". Merkurov himself characterized his work: "I created the" Thought ". This sculpture depicts a man who tried to find his ways with his own mind to remake the world ".
