= Thoth (film) =

- Directed by: Sarah Kernochan
- Produced by: Lynn Appelle; Curt Johnson
- Starring: S. K. Thoth
- Production company: Amateur Rabbit
- Distributed by: Direct Cinema
- Release date: 2001
- Running time: 40 minutes
- Country: United States
- Language: English

Thoth is a documentary film by Sarah Kernochan and Lynn Appelle about the life of New York–based street performer S. K. Thoth. In 2002, the film won the Oscar for Best Documentary Short Subject at the 74th Academy Awards.

== Awards and nominations ==
Incomplete list of awards for Thoth
Year	Award	Category	Result
2001	74th Academy Awards	Best Documentary Short Subject	Won

== See also ==
- List of documentary films
- List of American films of 2001
