= S. K. Thoth =

American performance artist

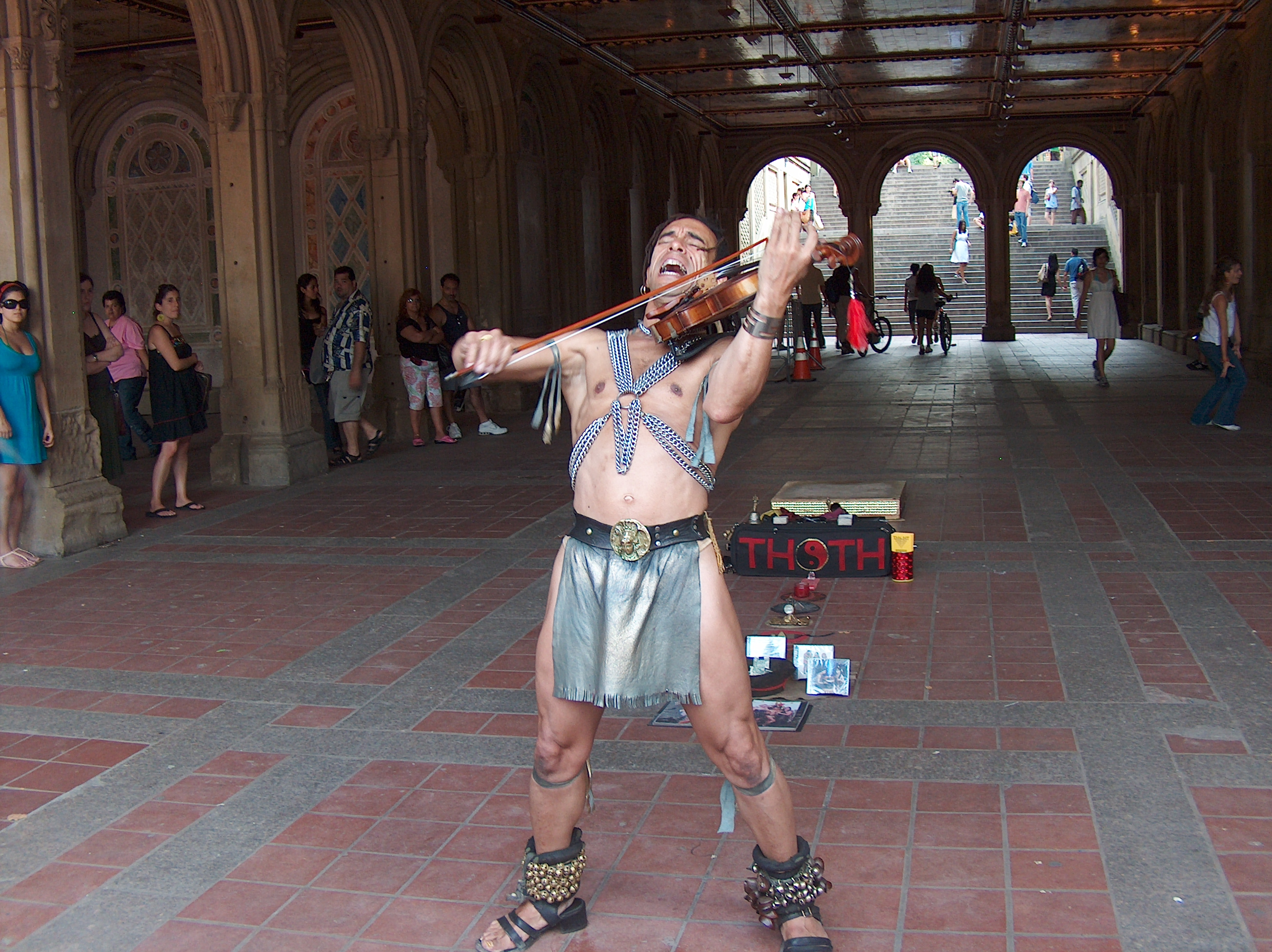
Thoth performing in Central Park, New York City in 2008

S. K. Thoth (or often just Thoth) is a New York-based performance artist known for his eclectic mix of violin, voice, and dance performance who was the subject of the Academy Award winning documentary Thoth. Thoth calls his work "prayformance", emphasizing a spiritual dimension. His motto from his website is "I heal through divine prayformance". He sings in a language he himself created, the language of the Festad, a mythical people and land in his "Solopera", his one-man opera.

== Early life ==
Thoth was born Stephen Kaufman in New York City around 1956. His father, Dr. George Kaufman, was a Russian Jew and chairman of the Queens branch of the Congress of Racial Equality, and his mother, the pioneering percussionist Elayne Jones, was born in Harlem. Stephen Kaufman attended LaGuardia High School of the Arts in Manhattan and holds a degree in comparative literature from San Francisco State University.

His mother was the first African-American timpani player for the New York Philharmonic, and Thoth was exposed to classical music at a young age. His mother's connections allowed him access to education from professional musicians.

In the early 1990s Thoth worked occasionally as a model in life drawing classes at the Sharon Art Studio in San Francisco's Golden Gate Park. He also performed in the park and in BART and MUNI stations.

== Career ==
Kaufman chose the name of Thoth, an ancient Egyptian deity, because he perceived Egypt to historically be "the center for mixed races". Thoth invented his own world, the Festad, from which his solopera The Herma: The Life and Land of Nular-In is taken. Thoth began performing this one-man opera in San Francisco, and then New York.

With various musicians including Scott Kungha Drengsen, Boris Goldman, and Rhan Wilson, Thoth recorded three CDs.

The band dissolved in 1998 and Thoth began performing solo and created an original epic opera, “THE HERMA: The Life and Land of Nular-in” based on a mythical land called the Festad which he has been writing about since a child.

Thoth's manner of street performance involves playing his violin while singing in a language he invented and dancing with various chimes and bells attached to his attire providing percussion for the performance. He has called this form of entertainment a "Prayformance" because it is a prayer as well as a performance, together. Thoth frequently performs in a gold lamé loincloth.

Thoth auditioned for the reality show America's Got Talent.

== Documentary and Academy Award ==
Documentary filmmakers Sarah Kernochan and Lynn Appelle won an Academy Award in 2002 for Best Documentary Short Subject for chronicling Thoth's life and public performances in New York City. Another short documentary by multimedia artist Mithaq Kazimi, captures Thoth & Lila' Angelique in San Diego as they perform the last song of their day and discuss life afterwards.

== Personal life ==
Lila'Angelique, coloratura soprano and violinist, became Thoth's protégée in 2009. They began touring on November 17, 2009 and have been performing in several countries ever since as Tribal Baroque. They were married on May 17, 2014. In 2015, they wrote "Esh and Ee-ay", their first original opera. It debuted on September 6 of the same year in Martha's Vineyard. As of 2026, Lila and Thoth currently live in Ubud, Bali, Indonesia, with their white mini Pomeranian, Mimi.
