= Thoth (crater) =

Crater on Ganymede

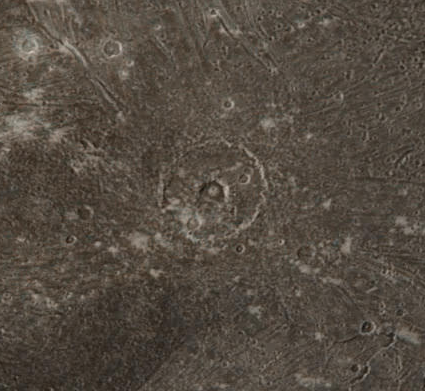
- An image of Thoth crater, taken by Voyager 2 on 9 July 1979. The lobate scarp on the lower right is Yaroun Patera.
- Feature type: Pit crater
- Coordinates: 43.22°S 147.25°W
- Diameter: 102 kilometres (63 mi)
- Eponym: Thoth

Thoth is a crater on Ganymede, the largest moon of Jupiter. The crater is approximately 102 kilometres (63 mi) wide and it has a pit at its center which is quite common on Ganymede.

== Naming ==
Thoth is named after the ibis-headed Egyptian deity Thoth, the god of wisdom, learning, and writing. According to the Ogdoad tradition of Ancient Egyptian belief, in the beginning of time, Thoth created himself and then he used his magical words to create the universe. He is credited as the inventor of writing and mathematics and was also considered the mediator of disputes between the gods, as well as the one who records the judgment of people after death on behalf of Osiris, the ruler of the Egyptian afterlife.

The International Astronomical Union (IAU), the organization responsible for formally naming surface features on celestial bodies, chose the name Thoth in accordance with the convention specifying that craters on Ganymede are to be named after deities, heroes, or places from Ancient Middle Eastern mythology. Ancient Egyptian mythology is traditionally considered one of the Middle Eastern mythologies.

The IAU approved the name for Thoth in 1985.

== Location ==
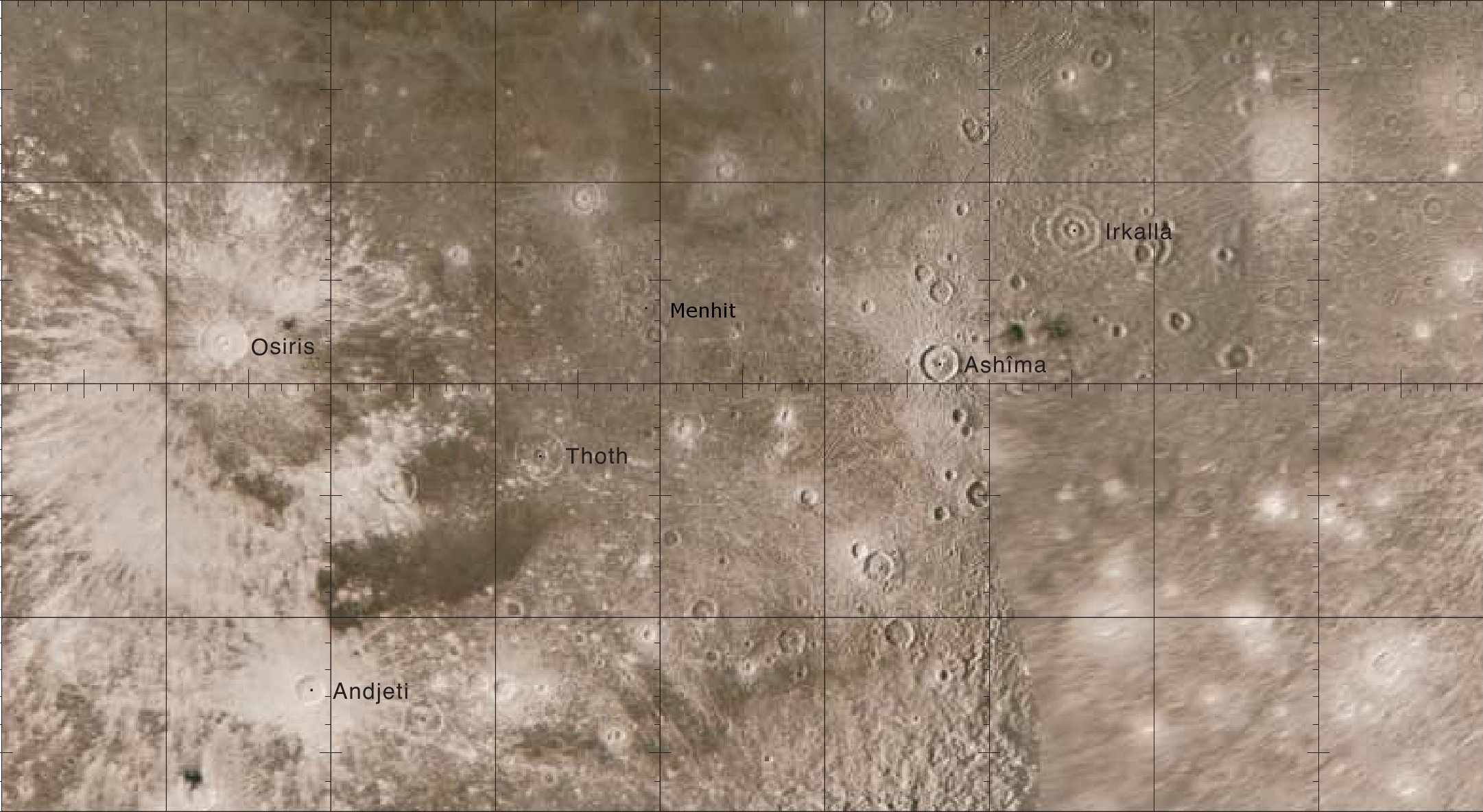
The Osiris quadrangle where Thoth is located.

Thoth is located at mid-latitudes in the southern hemisphere of Ganymede.. The area in Thoth's vicinity is populated by different kinds of craters. To its west lies the prominent ray crater Osiris which dominates the region.

To the northeast is the crater Menhit, while to the southeast is a surface depression called Yaroun Patera, which is a possible ground-level cryovolcano. Another ray crater called Andjeti lies to the southeast.

Thoth is situated within the Osiris quadrangle (or section) of Ganymede (designated Jg12).

Thoth is located on the hemisphere of Ganymede that never faces Jupiter as a result of the moon's synchronous rotation. From this location, Jupiter would never be visible in the sky. (Note: For moons in synchronous rotation, such as Ganymede, 0° longitude corresponds to the part of the surface that always faces Jupiter. Regions between 90° W and 270° W longitude never face the moon's parent planet.)

== Morphology and Geology ==
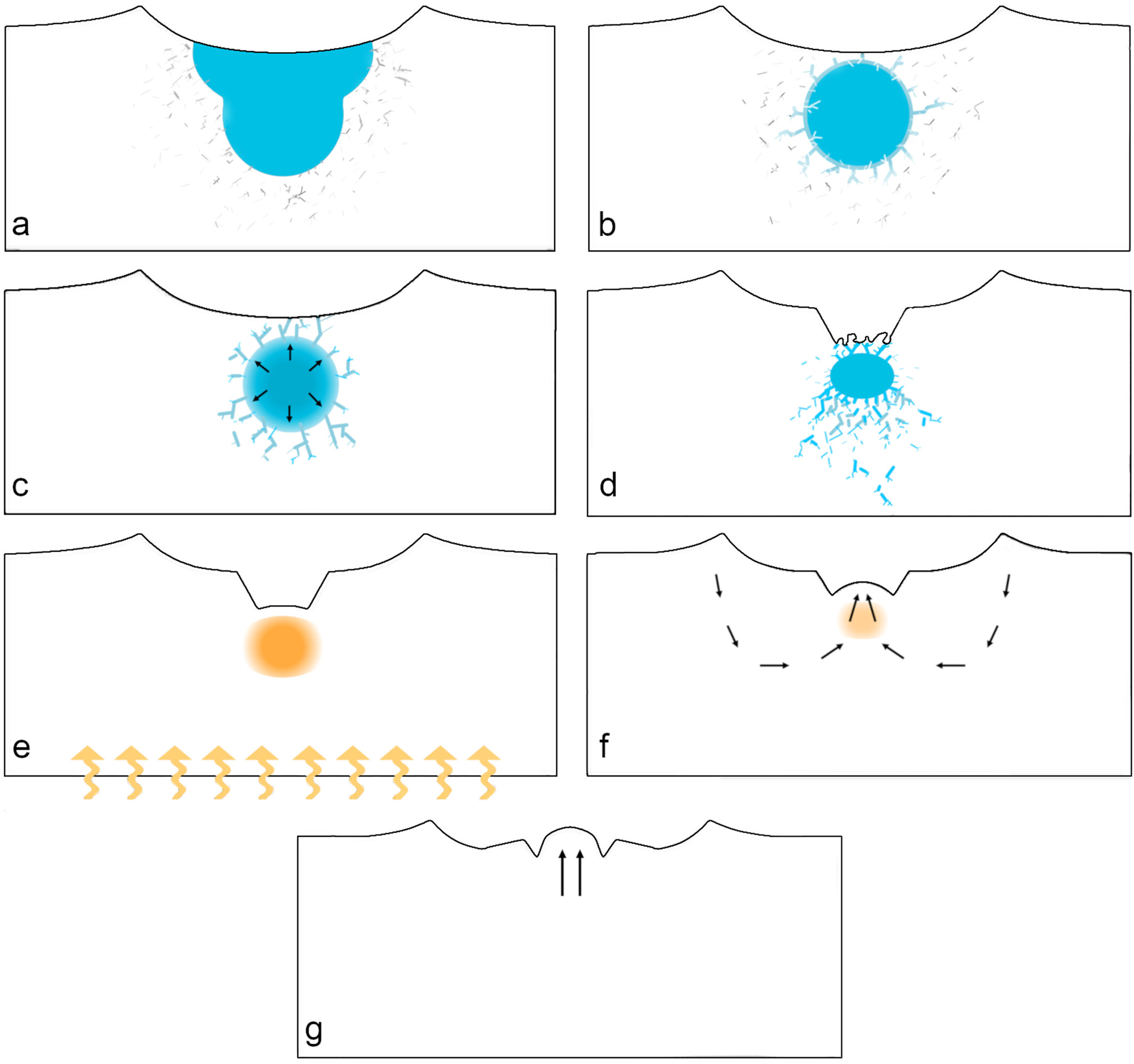
A diagram showing the steps in the formation of pits dome craters on icy moons. It shows how the refreezing of meltwater from meteorite impacts can cause both the formation of sinkholes and the dome-forming expansion of an icy crust.

Thoth is a crater with a pit at its center. This crater morphology is rare on rocky bodies like the Moon or planet Mercury, but common on icy moons like Ganymede. It is believed that this is due to the nature of Ganymede's crust being made of water ice. Central pits form when heat from an asteroid impact generates meltwater beneath the crater floor. As this water refreezes, it expands—because water increases in volume upon freezing—fracturing and weakening the floor and causing it to collapse into a sinkhole-like pit, often near the center of the crater. These pit craters may continue to evolve if meltwater persists below the surface, as repeated freezing and expansion can eventually uplift the pit into a dome, similar to the one found in the nearby Osiris crater.

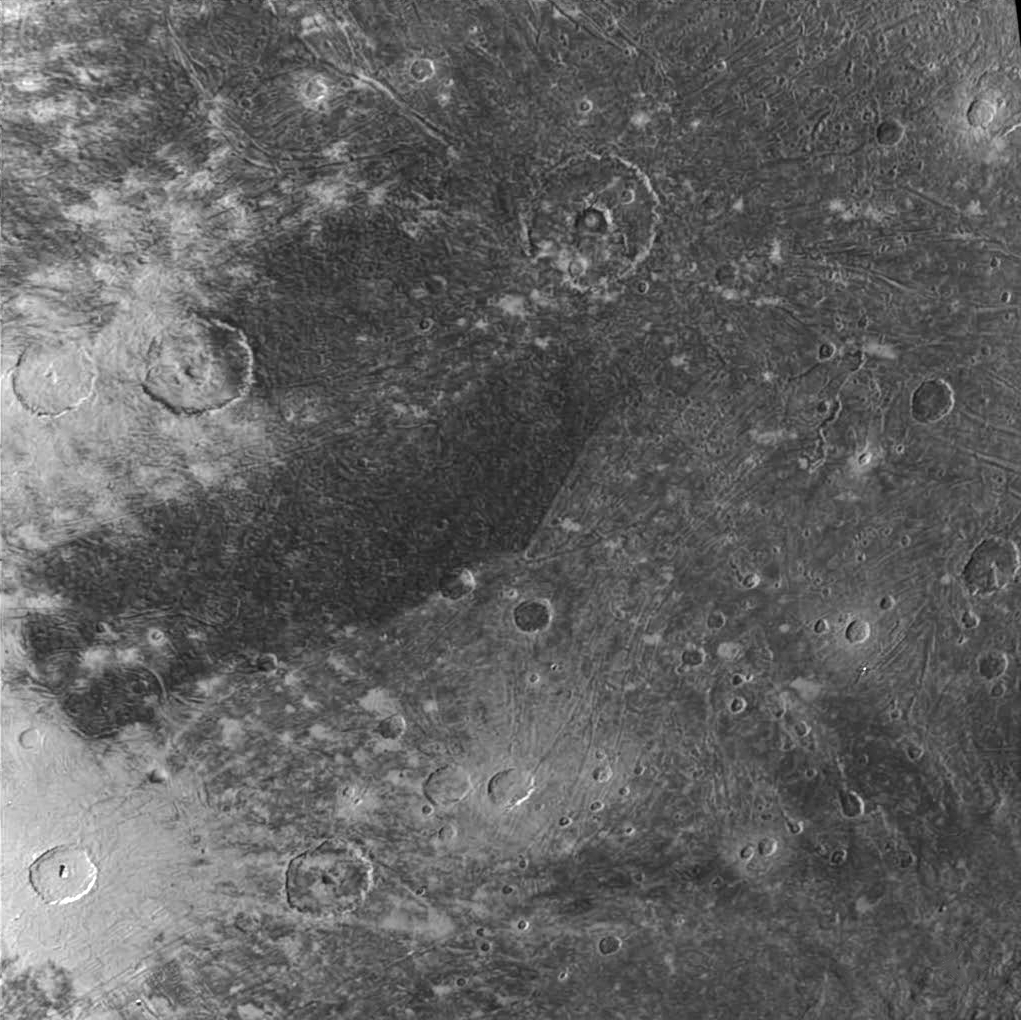
The area south of crater Thoth (above the center), taken by Voyager 2 in July 1979. The bright crater on the lower left corner is Andjeti.

Thoth does not have any crater rays, unlike the nearby ray craters Osiris and Andjeti. The exact reason for this is not yet fully known, but it is possible that Thoth is a much older crater that has lost its rays long ago due to space weathering. Some of the extensive bright rays and secondary craters from Osiris coat portions of Thoth's structure, strongly indicating that Osiris is more recent than Thoth.

== Exploration ==
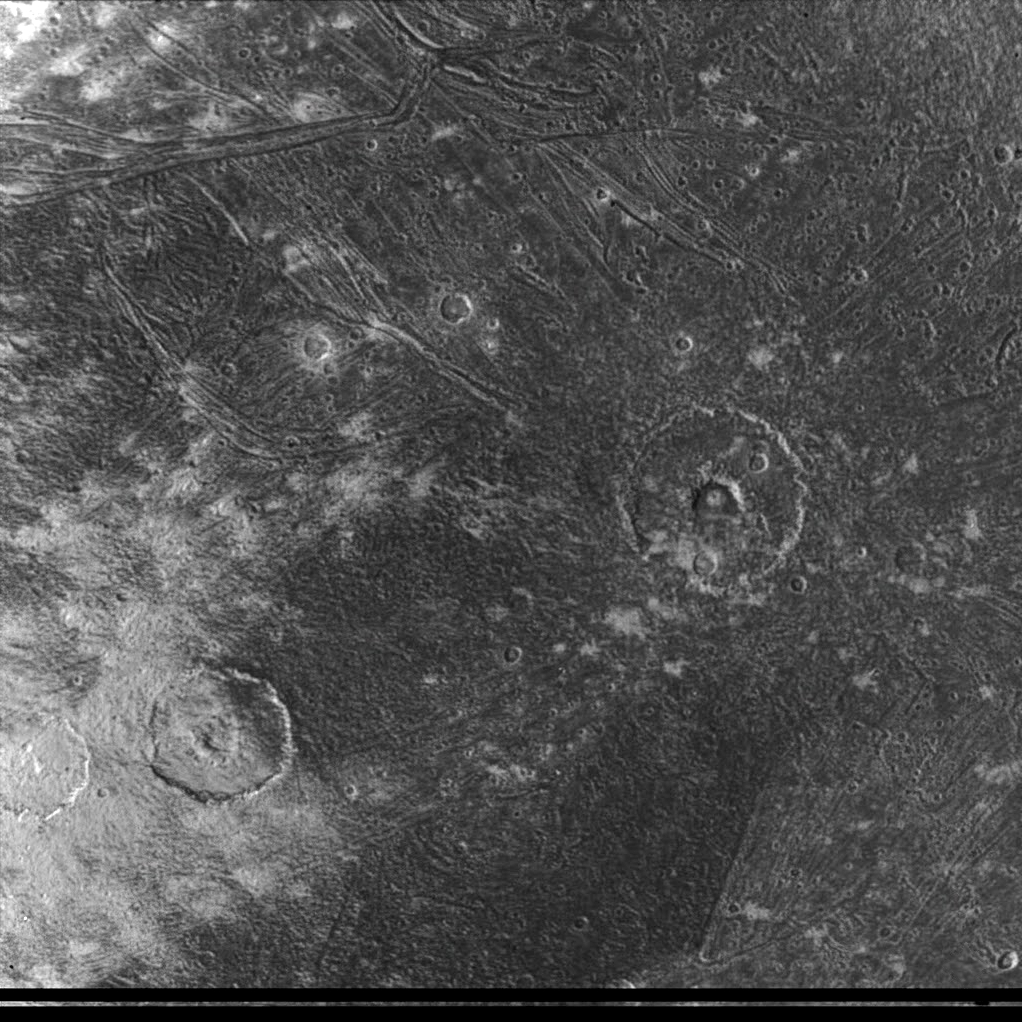
An image of Thoth crater (slightly to the right from the center), taken by Voyager 2 in July 1979.

Voyager 2 was the first spacecraft to image the side of Ganymede that never faces Jupiter during its flyby in July 1979. Owing to its slightly southward trajectory during the encounter with Jupiter and Ganymede, the probe captured high-quality images of the regions surrounding Thoth.

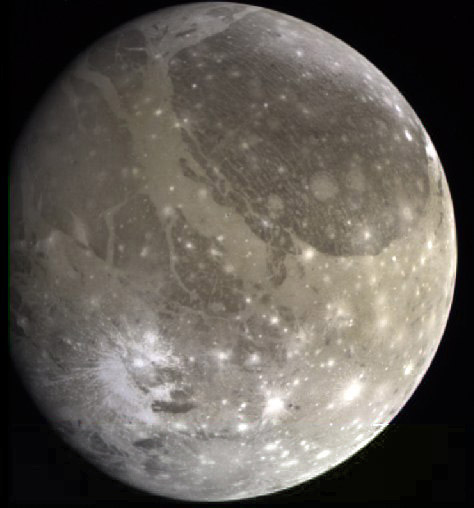
A full-disk image of Ganymede, taken by Galileo in June 1996. The bright ray crater Osiris is visible at the bottom left of the image, and just east of it lies Thoth, a barely visible crater.

The Galileo probe was the next—and, as of 2026, the most recent—spacecraft to observe Thoth while orbiting Jupiter between December 1995 and September 2003. However, it imaged Thoth crater only from a distance, and no high-resolution images of the crater are available in its image archive.

=== Future Missions ===
The European Space Agency's (ESA) Jupiter Icy Moons Explorer (Juice) is scheduled to arrive at Jupiter in July 2031. After performing several flybys of Europa, Ganymede, and Callisto while orbiting Jupiter for three and a half years, Juice is set to enter a low orbit around Ganymede at a distance of just 500 kilometres (310 mi) in July 2034. The probe is expected to return clear images of Thoth.

== See also ==
- List of craters on Ganymede
- Meteor
