= Shu (crater) =

Crater on Ganymede

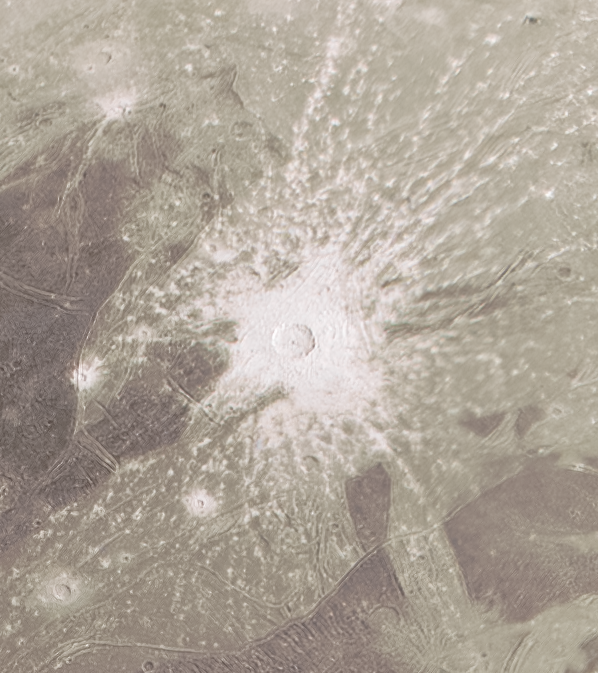
- An image of Shu crater, taken by the Juno space probe on 7 June 2021.
- Feature type: Bright ray crater
- Coordinates: 43.16°N 356.84°W
- Diameter: 44 kilometres (27 mi)
- Eponym: Shu

Shu is a prominent bright ray impact crater in the northern hemisphere of Ganymede, the largest moon of Jupiter. The crater is approximately 44 kilometres (27 mi) in diameter, and its bright ray system extends for several hundred kilometers in all directions.

== Naming ==
Shu is named after the Ancient Egyptian god of the air and wind, Shu. He is the firstborn son of Ra, the sun god and king of the Egyptian gods. The Ancient Egyptians believed that, as the god of the air and wind, Shu separated the earth (the god Geb) from the sky (the goddess Nut), and he fills the space in between the two.

The crater's name follows the International Astronomical Union's (IAU) naming convention, under which craters and other surface features on Ganymede are named after deities, heroes, and places from Ancient Near Eastern mythology, including Ancient Egyptian mythology.

The name for Shu was approved by the IAU in 1988.

== Location ==
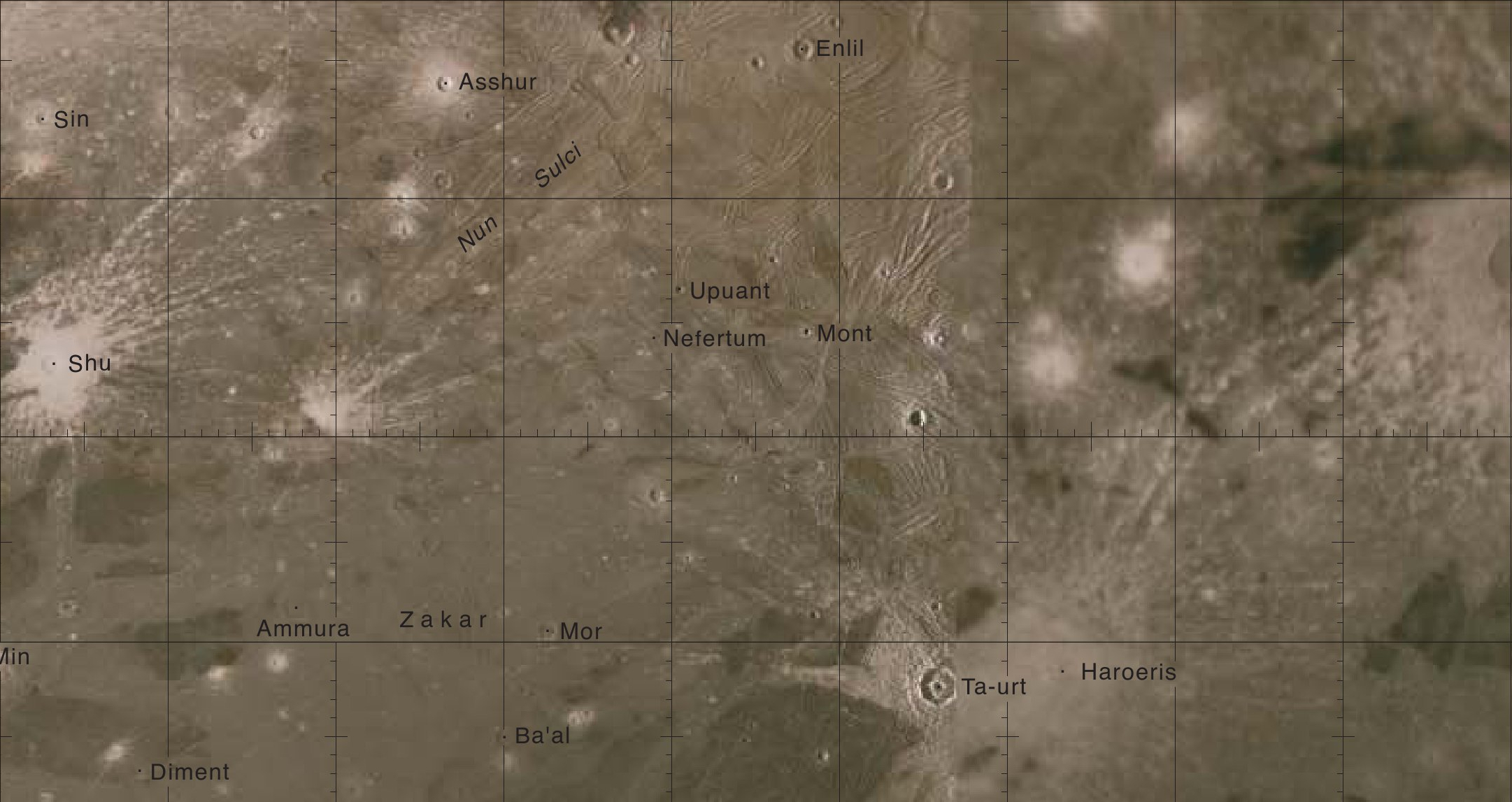
The Nun Sulci quadrangle on Ganymede. Shu crater is located on the western end of the quadrangle.

Shu is located in the mid-latitudes of Ganymede's northern hemisphere. It lies almost exactly on the eastern boundary of the dark region Perrine Regio. Its bright ray system extends across much of the surrounding dark terrain, making the crater stand out prominently.

To the west of Shu lies the crater chain Enki Catena, while the crater chain Khnum Catena lies to the southeast. To the north are the grooved terrain of Aquarius Sulcus and the crater Sin.

To the south and southwest of Shu is the terminus of the bright grooved terrain Sicyon Sulcus.

Shu lies within the western edge of the Nun Sulci (designated Jg5) quadrangles of Ganymede, though many of its rays are intruding into the adjacent Perrine Regio quadrangle.

Because Ganymede is in synchronous rotation with Jupiter, the same hemisphere of the moon always faces its parent planet, while the opposite hemisphere always faces away from it. Consequently, because Shu is located on Ganymede's Jupiter-facing side, Jupiter would always appear in the sky, as seen from the crater. (Note: For moons in synchronous rotation, such as Ganymede, 0° longitude corresponds to the part of the surface that always faces Jupiter. Regions between 90° W and 270° W longitude never face the moon’s parent planet.)

== Characteristic ==
At 44 kilometres (27 mi) in diameter, Shu is a medium-sized impact crater and one of Ganymede's many bright-ray craters. Its ray system is among the brightest on Ganymede's surface. However, because no high-resolution images of Shu are available, it remains uncertain whether the crater contains a central pit or a central peak, both of which are common features of Ganymedean impact craters.

== Exploration ==
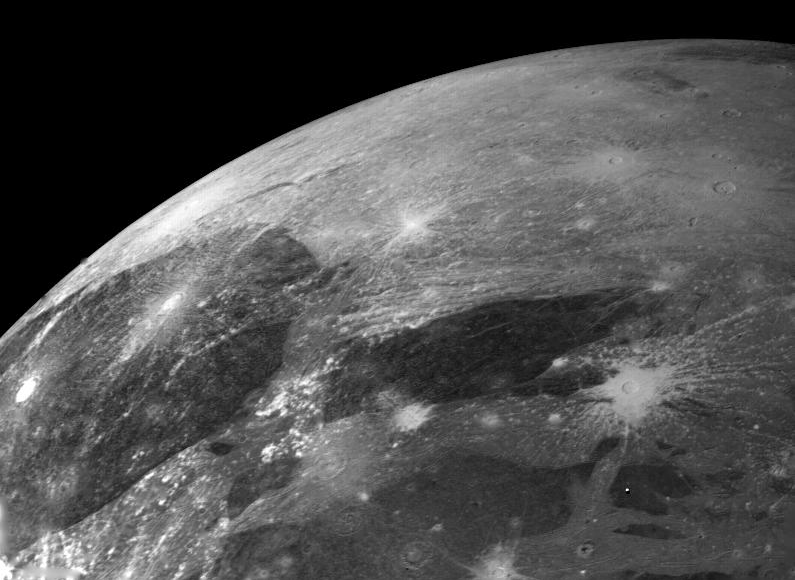
A narrow-angle image of Ganymede's northern hemisphere, taken by Voyager 1 in March 1979. Shu crater (the bright ray crater to the right) is clearly visible in this image.

Voyager 1 became the first spacecraft to observe and image Shu during its flyby of the Jovian system in March 1979. During the encounter, Voyager 1 imaged the Jupiter-facing hemisphere of Ganymede, where Shu is located.

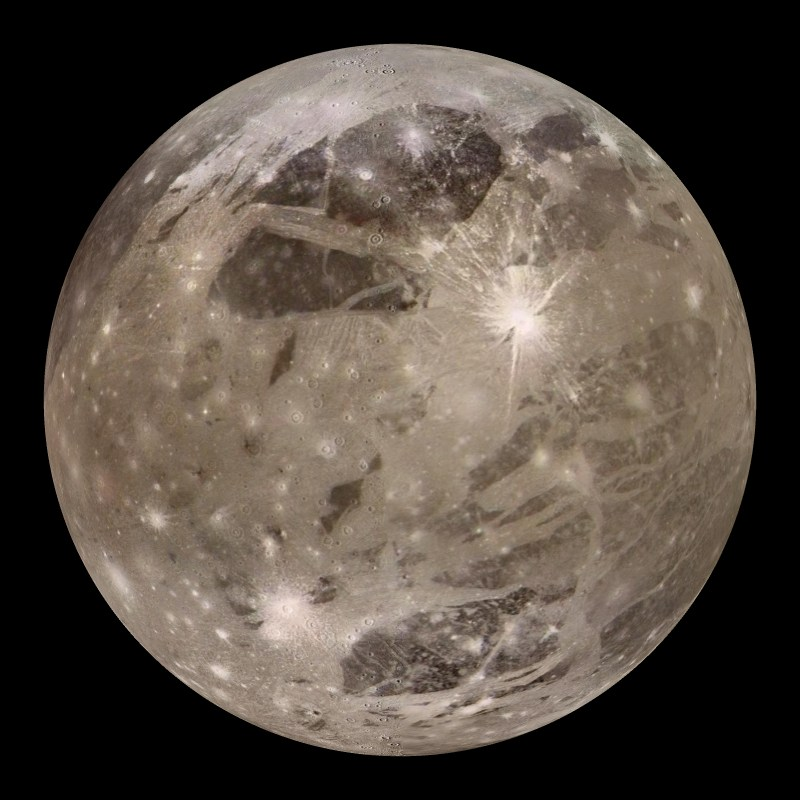
An orthographic image of Ganymede acquired by Galileo. Shu is located near the upper right edge of the moon in this image.

Although Galileo observed Ganymede repeatedly during its mission, it did not obtain close-up images of any of the moon's bright-ray craters except Achelous. Galileo imaged Shu several times, but always did so from a considerable distance, limiting the level of detail visible in the images.

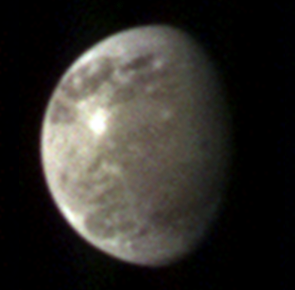
A distant image of Ganymede, acquired by Cassini in December 2000. Shu is located about halfway between the center and the top of the image.

The next spacecraft to image Shu was the Cassini spacecraft, which flew through the Jovian system in December 2000 to obtain a gravity assist on its way to Saturn. Because the spacecraft passed approximately 10,350,000 km (6,430,000 mi) from Ganymede during the flyby, Shu is only faintly visible in the images it returned. Nevertheless, its bright ray system allows it to stand out against the surrounding terrain.

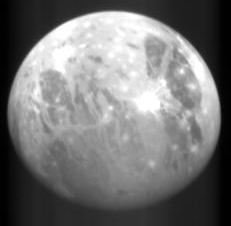
An image of Ganymede's Jupiter-facing hemisphere, acquired by New Horizons' LORRI in February 2007. Shu is the bright crater near the lower right corner of Ganymede.

New Horizons also imaged Shu during its flyby of the Jovian system in February 2007 on its way to Pluto. Although the spacecraft passed approximately 3,500,000 km (2,200,000 mi) from Ganymede — much closer than Cassini did — it still obtained only relatively low-resolution images of Shu.

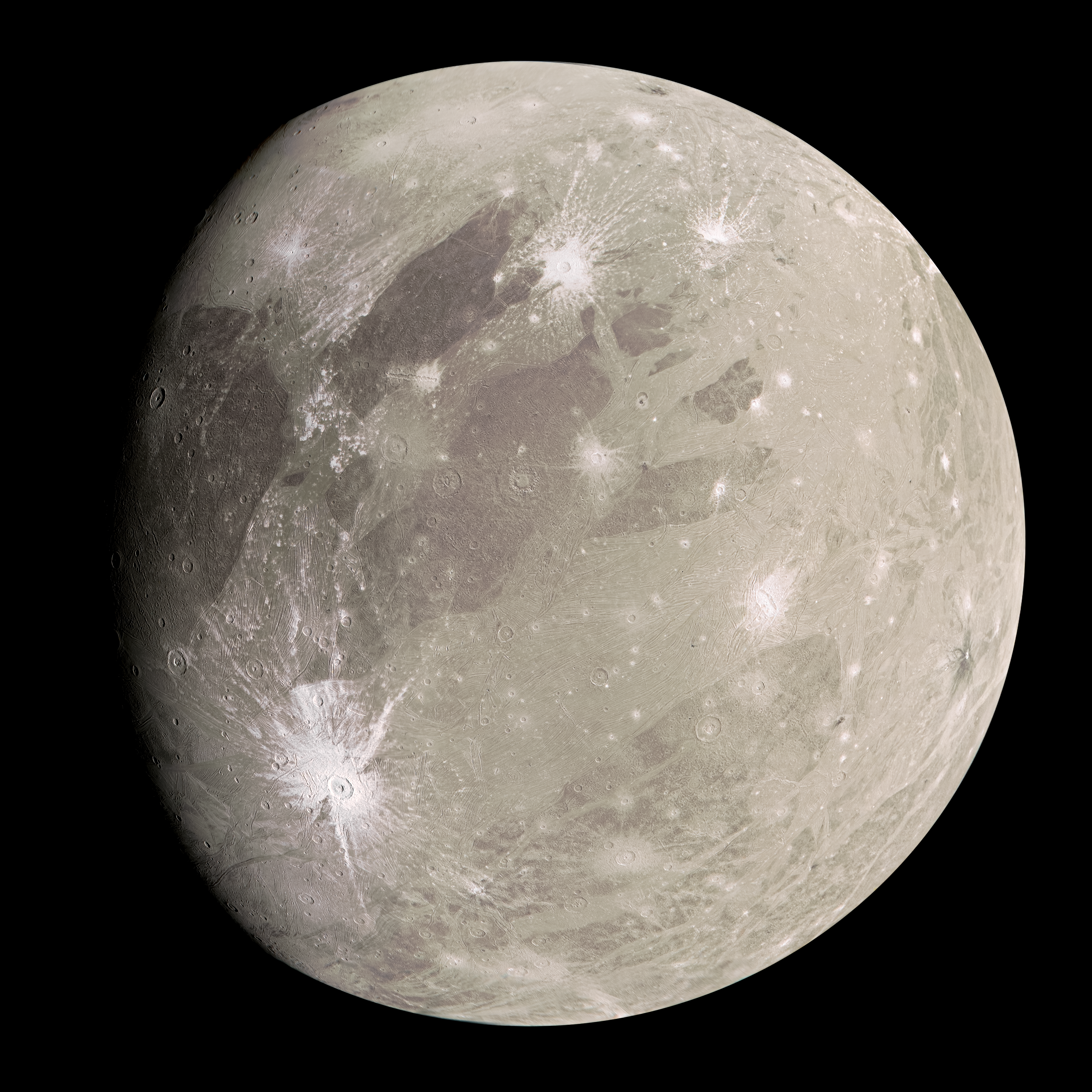
A true color image of Ganymede, taken by the Juno space probe in June 2021. Shu is the ray crater that is halfway between the top and center of Ganymede in this image.

The most recent spacecraft to image Shu was the Juno spacecraft, which performed a close flyby of Ganymede in June 2021 to adjust and shorten its orbit around Jupiter. Shu appears prominently in Juno's images as a well-defined impact crater. However, the flyby was not close enough to resolve details within the crater, making it difficult to determine whether Shu possesses a central pit or a central peak. As of 2026, Juno's images of Shu remain the highest-resolution images available.

=== Future missions ===
The European Space Agency's (ESA) Jupiter Icy Moons Explorer (Juice) orbiter, launched in April 2023, is scheduled to arrive at Jupiter in July 2031. After spending approximately three and a half years orbiting Jupiter and conducting multiple flybys of Europa, Callisto, and Ganymede, Juice will enter a low polar orbit around Ganymede at an altitude of approximately 500 kilometres (310 mi) above the moon's surface. From this close orbit, the spacecraft is expected to obtain high-resolution images of Shu, potentially allowing planetary scientists to determine whether the crater contains a central peak or a central pit.

== See also ==
- List of craters on Ganymede
- Meteor
