= Nanshe Catena =

Crater chain on Ganymede

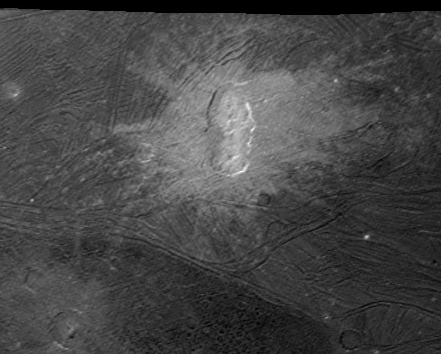
- An image of Nanshe Catena, taken by Voyager 1 on 5 March 1979.
- Feature type: Catena
- Coordinates: 15.40°N 352.90°W
- Length: 103.80 kilometres (64.50 mi)
- Eponym: Nanshe

Nanshe Catena is a crater chain on Ganymede, the largest moon of the planet Jupiter. The crater chain is 103.8 kilometres (64.5 mi) long and about 50 kilometres (31 mi) wide, and it is composed of around seven individual ray craters that are closely overlapping each other, forming a line or chain.

== Naming ==
Nanshe Catena is named after the goddess of spring water and aquatic animals from Mesopotamian mythology. According to legend, Nanshe was the daughter of Enki, the god of wisdom. After Enki completed his task of helping bring order to the cosmos, he assigned Nanshe the divine duty of taking care of the fishes of the rivers and sea. Nanshe is also associated with the interpretation of dreams and soothsaying.

The name for Nanshe Catena was chosen in line with the rule set by the International Astronomical Union (IAU) that stipulates that craters and crater chains on Ganymede should be named after deities and heroes from Ancient Middle Eastern mythologies, including Mesopotamian mythology.

The IAU approved the name for Nanshe Catena in 1997.

== Location ==
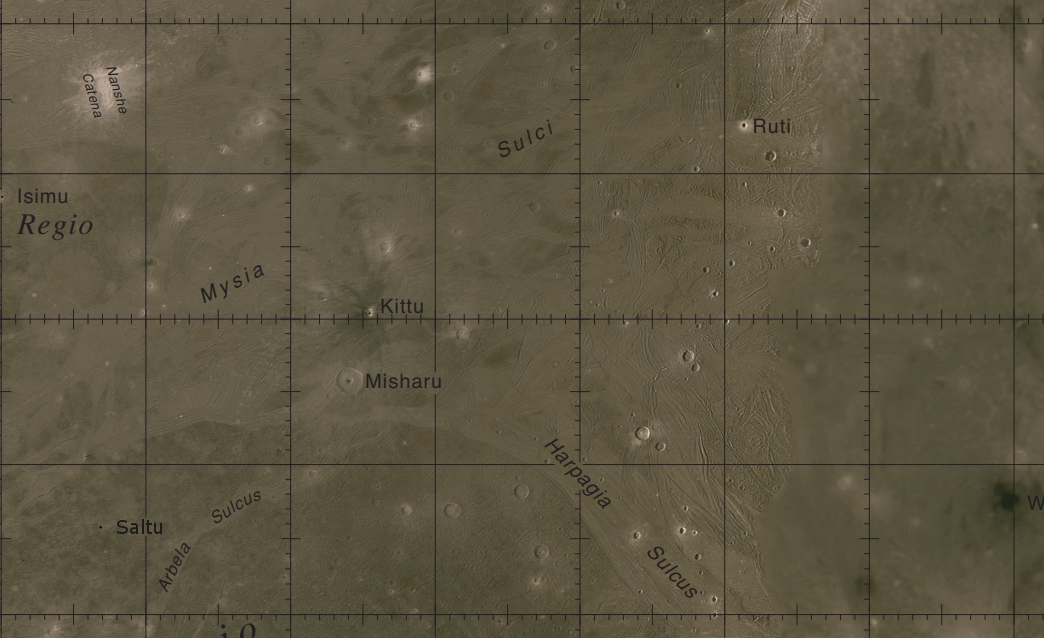
A map of Ganymede's Misharu quadrangle, showing Nanshe Catena in the upper left.

Nanshe Catena is located at the eastern end of Phrygia Sulcus, a bright, grooved terrain on Ganymede to the northeast of a dark, ancient region called Barnard Regio.

Only two craters in Nanshe Catena's vicinity have names: the bright ray crater Diment to the north, and the strained, dome crater Isimu to the southwest.

Nanshe Catena is situated in the northwest corner of the Misharu quadrangle (or section) of Ganymede (designated Jg10).

Because Ganymede is in synchronous rotation as it orbit around Jupiter, one hemisphere of the moon is always facing its parent planet, while the opposite hemisphere never does. Nanshe Catena is located on the Jupiter-facing hemisphere of Ganymede, which means that an observer standing at Nanshe Catena will always see Jupiter in the sky almost directly overhead at all times. (Note: For moons in synchronous rotation, such as Ganymede, 0° longitude corresponds to the part of the surface that always faces Jupiter. Regions between 90° W to 0° to 270° W longitude always face the moon’s parent planet.)

== Morphology and Age ==
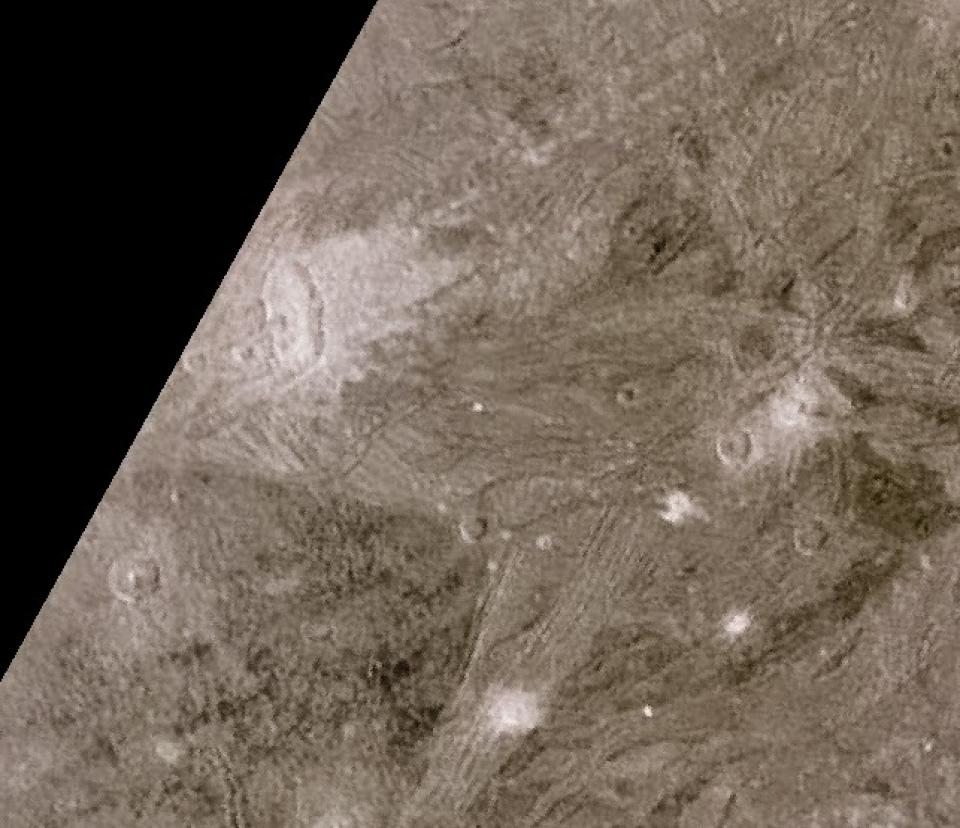
An image of Nanshe Catena (left), taken by Juno in June 2021. The white spot at the center is potentially a new crater that formed in the last 20 year.

Nanshe Catena is roughly capsule-like in shape. The bright rays extending from the craters of the catena indicate that it was formed recently in terms of geologic timescale. While the exact age of the crater is unknown, it probably formed within the past few hundred million years or so.

== Exploration ==
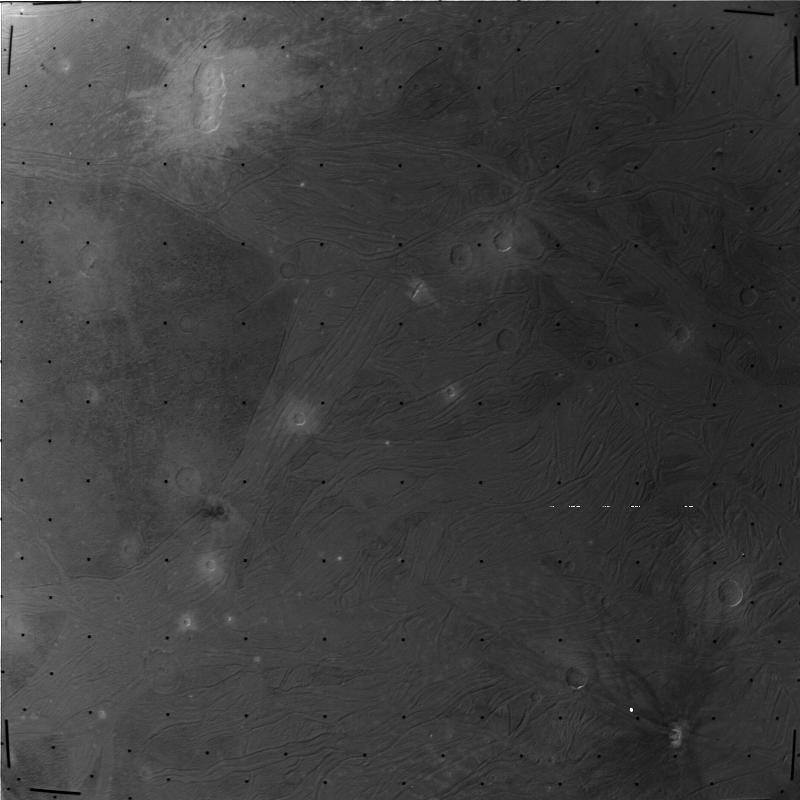
Nanshe Catena (upper right), as imaged by Voyager 1 in March 1979.

Nanshe Catena was imaged in close-up only by Voyager 1 during its flyby of Ganymede in March 1979. It was able to image Nanshe Catena at a medium resolution of 1,000 metres (3,300 ft) per pixel.

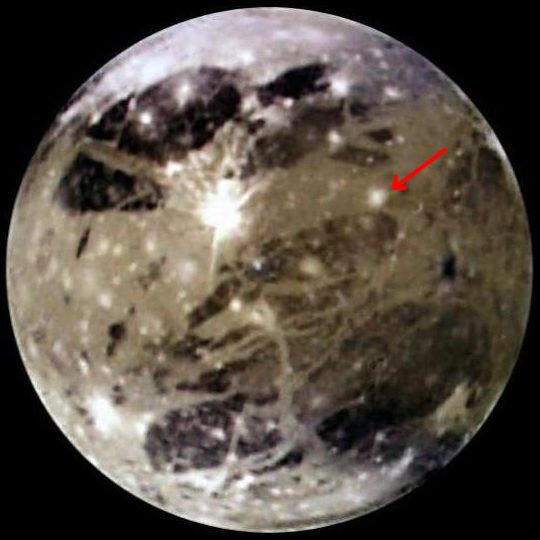
A distant enhanced-color image of Nanshe Catena (marked with a red arrow), taken in September 1997 by Galileo. The very bright crater to the left is Tros.

Galileo was only able to photograph Nanshe Catena from great distances, such as during its distant flyby of Ganymede in September 1997. No high-resolution images from Galileo are available in its image galleries.

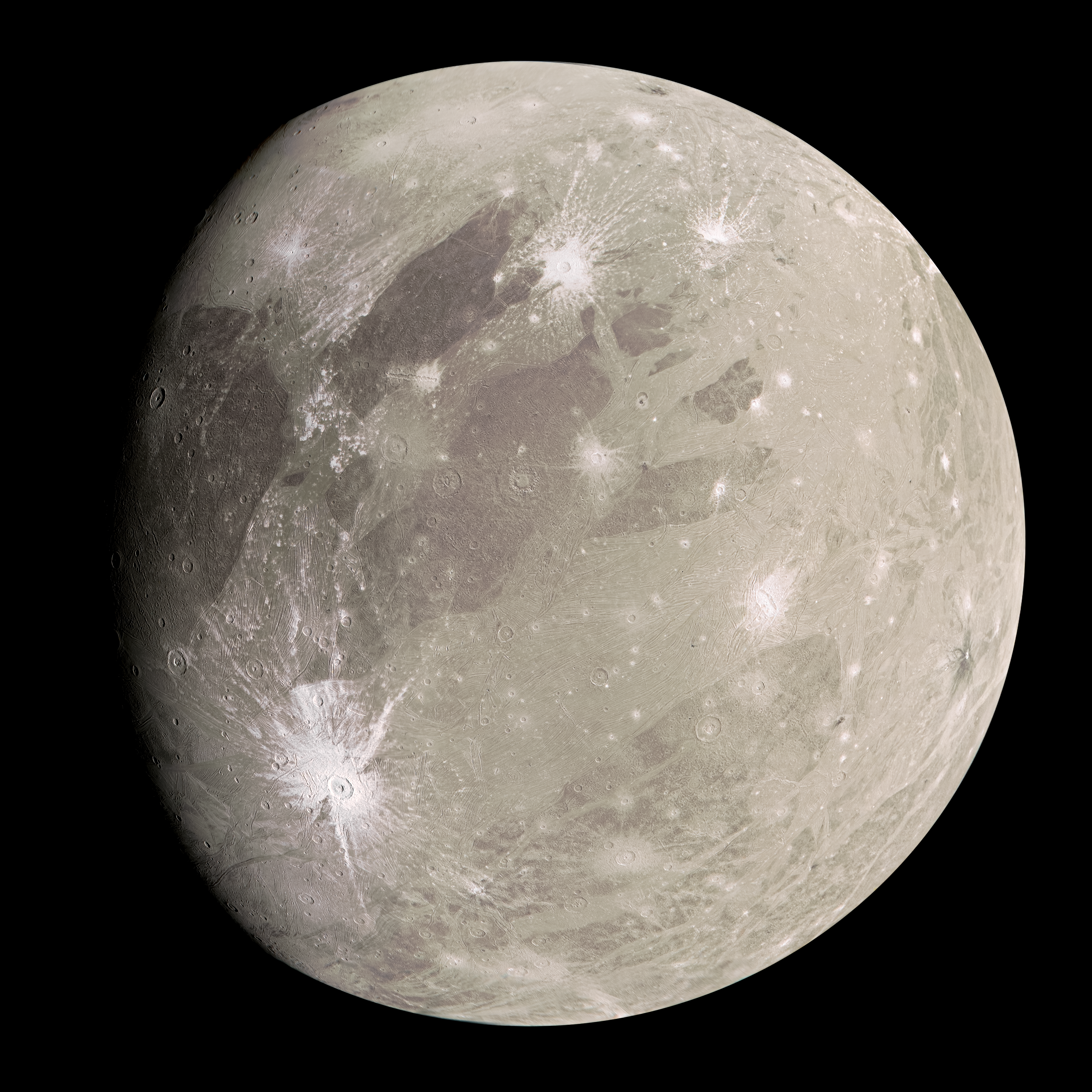
An image of Ganymede, showing Nanshe Catena (to the right from the center), taken by the Juno spacecraft in June 2021.

In June 2021, the Juno spacecraft flew by Ganymede during its 34th perijove (i.e. closest approach to Jupiter during orbit). It was able to image Nanshe Catena at high resolution. Juno also may have imaged a new crater to the southeast of Nanshe Catena.

=== Future Missions ===
The European Space Agency's (ESA) Jupiter Icy Moons Explorer (Juice) will arrive at Jupiter in July 2031. Juice is expected to settle into a low orbit around Ganymede at a distance of just 500 kilometres (310 mi) in July 2034 after spending three and a half years orbiting Jupiter. Juice will provide the first high-resolution images of the bright catena.

== See also ==
- List of geological features on Ganymede
- Comet Shoemaker-Levy 9
