= Neith (crater) =

Crater on Ganymede

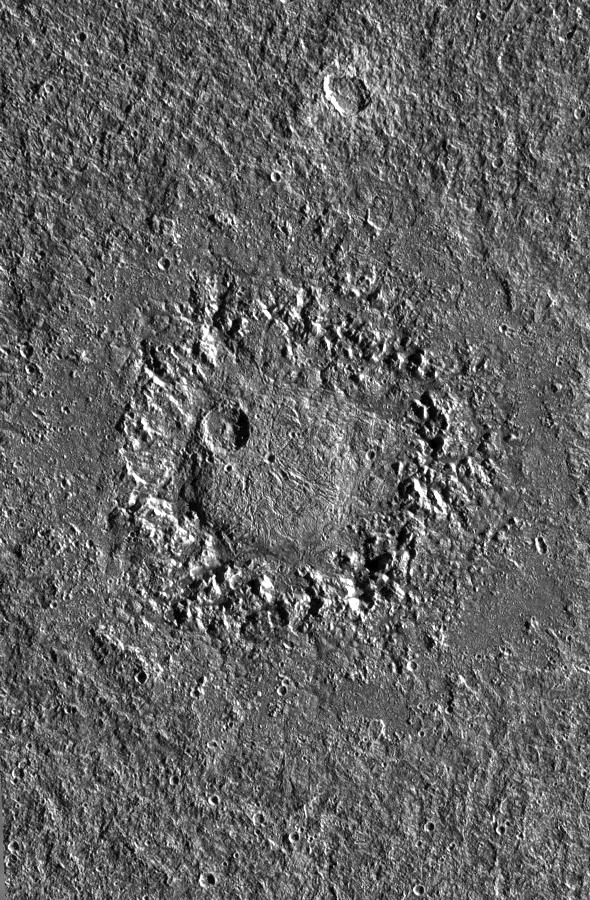
- A Galileo probe photo of Neith, taken on October 7, 1999.
- Feature type: Dome crater
- Coordinates: 29.45°N 6.97°W
- Diameter: 87.6 kilometres (54.4 mi)
- Eponym: Neith

Neith is an ancient impact crater on Ganymede, the largest moon of Jupiter.

== Naming ==
Neith is named after the Egyptian goddess Neith, a goddess of creation, fate, weaving and archery. The International Astronomical Union (IAU) chose this name in line with the theme that surface features on Ganymede be named after deities, figures and places from Ancient Middle Eastern mythology, including Egyptian mythology. The name was approved in 1988.

== Location ==
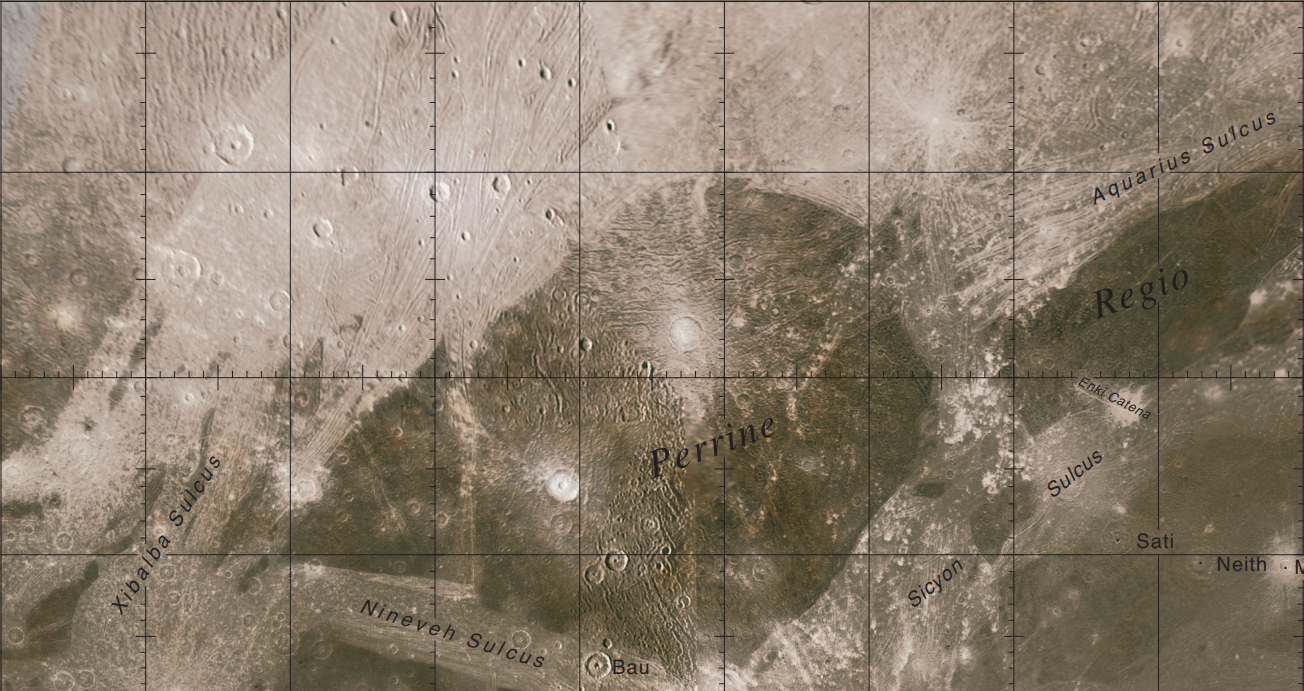
A map of the Perrine Regio quadrangle on Ganymede. Neith is on the lower right of the image.

Neith is located in the southeastern part of Perrine Regio, a dark, ancient region in the northern hemisphere of Ganymede. To its west is the crater Sati, and to its east is the bright ray crater Min.

Neith is located within the Perrine quadrangle (designated Jg2) of Ganymede, which is named after the dark regio in which the crater lies. It is located on the side of Ganymede that always faces Jupiter due it the moon's synchronous rotation. This means that an observer standing inside Neith will always see Jupiter almost overhead at all times.

== Geology ==
Impact structures like Neith have been described as penepalimpsests by some researchers and as “anomalous dome crater” by others. They are thought to represent a transitional form between typical impact craters and palimpsests. Palimpsests themselves are bright, nearly circular markings interpreted as heavily degraded impact features; similar examples are found on Callisto, Ganymede’s outer neighbor.

Neith’s most prominent characteristic is a large circular dome roughly 45 km across, encircled by a ring of rugged terrain. This rugged ring is not the original crater rim but the rim of a large central pit. The true crater rim is faint and lies at the edge of a relatively smooth circular zone interpreted as the crater floor, which itself surrounds the rugged ring. Inward-facing scarps can be observed along parts of this rim, which is not perfectly circular but instead has a petal-like outline. Beyond it, a continuous ejecta blanket can still be traced.

The distinctive morphology of features like Neith may arise either from the way weak surface materials respond to high-energy impacts or from long-term viscous relaxation of the terrain following the impact.

Absolute ages derived from crater density measurements depend strongly on the impact chronology model used. In one model, which assumes asteroid-dominated impacts, Neith could be ancient—likely formed during a period of intense bombardment about 3.9 billion years ago. Another model, based on a roughly constant rate of cometary impacts, suggests Neith might be much younger, around 1 billion years old.

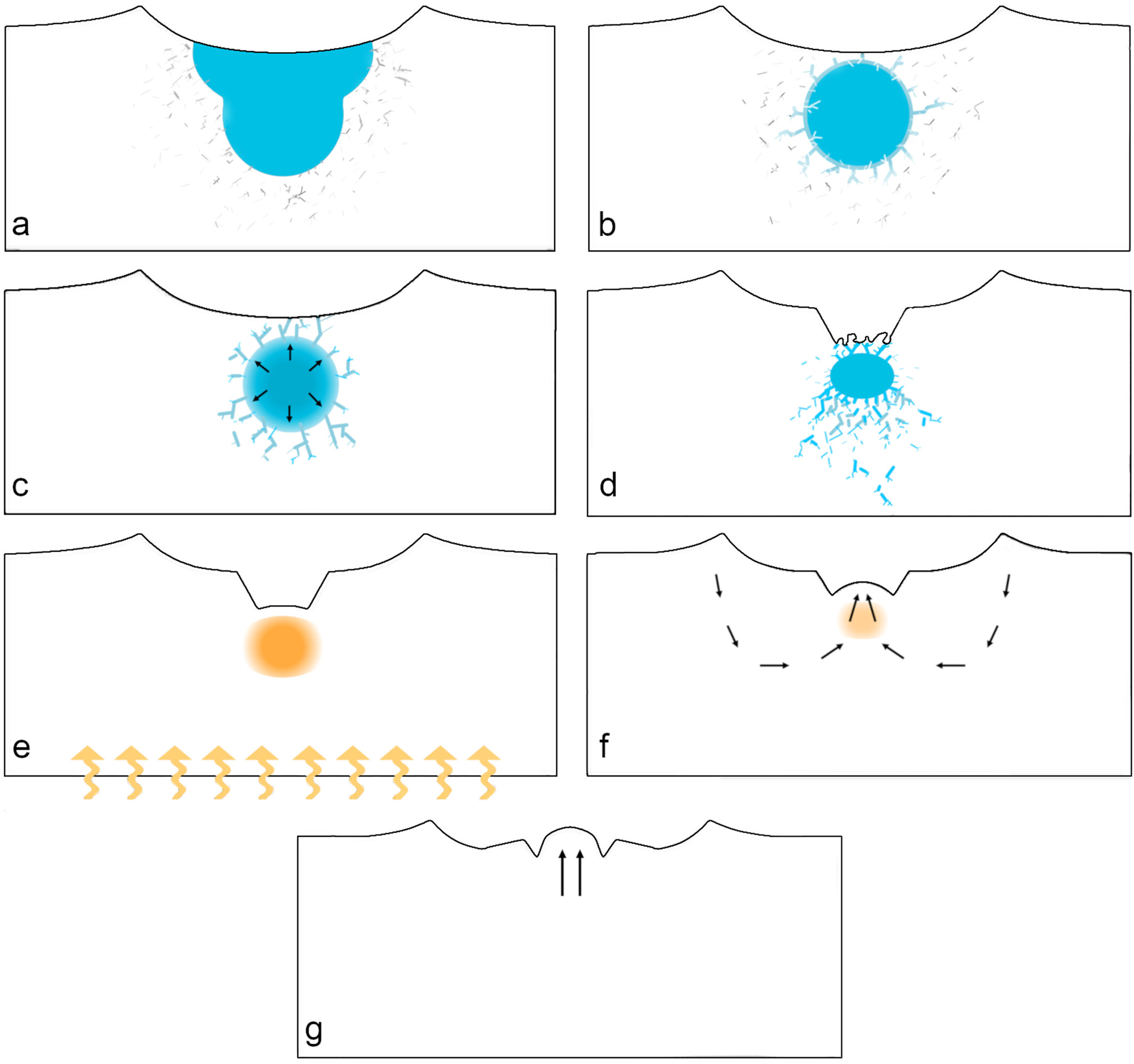
A diagram showing the steps in the formation of dome craters like Neith on icy moons. It shows how the refreezing of meltwater from meteorite impacts can cause both the formation of sinkholes and the dome-forming expansion of an icy crust.

Neith is considered an "anomalous" dome crater. Compared to regular central dome craters like the younger Osiris, anomalous ones tend to be larger and older with wider rims. Studies suggest that dome features formed when meltwater accumulated beneath the crater after the impact’s heat melted the moon’s icy surface. As this meltwater refroze, it produced fractures and structural weakening below the crater, causing the central region to collapse and form a circular pit. Continued freezing of the meltwater then caused it to expand—because water increases in volume when it turns to ice—uplifting the crater’s center into an icy dome and reshaping the pit into a circular trench. Domes of this type typically form only in craters larger than about 60 kilometers in diameter. The dome-to-diameter ratio increases with crater size, and rim-to-floor depths typically range from 0.8 kilometres (0.50 mi) to 1.6 kilometres (0.99 mi). Older dome craters like Neith appears darker than younger ones because their rays and fresh ice deposits have been erased by space weathering overtime.

Another dome crater on Ganymede comparable to Neith is Menhit, which is located on the opposite side of the moon.

== Exploration ==
Several spacecraft have observed and photographed Neith. However, the crater is, relatively speaking, not very big and quite dark due to its old age. This makes it difficult to resolve by distant flybys.

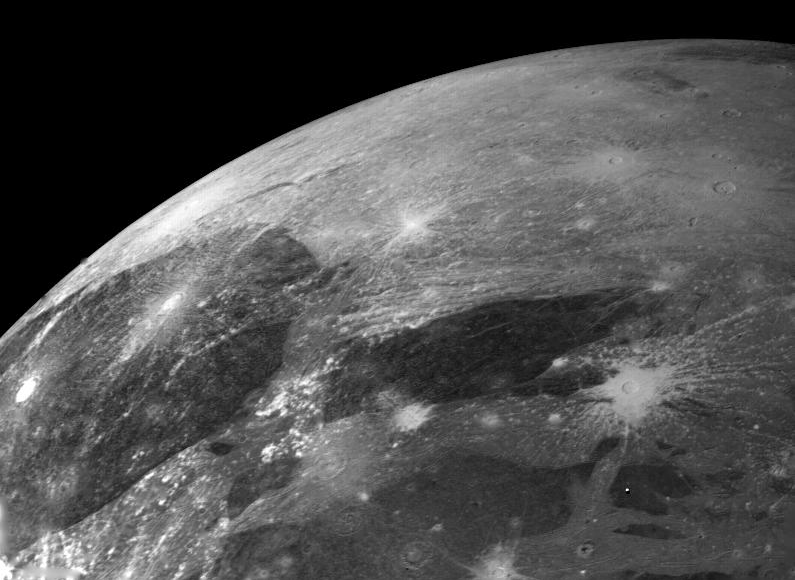
An image of Perrine Regio, with Neith at the very bottom center of the image, taken by Voyager 1 in March 1979.

Voyager 1 became the first probe to return usable images of Neith during its flyby of the Jovian system in March 1979. Neith appeared in its images, but there were not enough details to resolve its geography or nature. Voyager 2’s flight path took it to the opposite side of Ganymede during its visit a few months later, so it was not able to image Neith at all.

As of 2025, Galileo is the only spacecraft that has obtained closeup images of Neith with sufficient resolution to be useful for studying its nature, which it accomplished during its orbit around Jupiter from December 1995 to September 2003.

The December 2000 flyby of Cassini was too distant to resolve any details on Neith, while during the brief flyby of New Horizons in February 2007, Neith was hidden on the night side of the moon during the probe’s approach and departure.

During Juno's Perijove 34 (closest approach to Jupiter), it flew by Ganymede to adjust the length of its orbit. It was able to image the side of Ganymede that is always facing Jupiter, which includes Neith. The crater appeared in several mosaic images that it managed to obtain, but none of them were close up images.

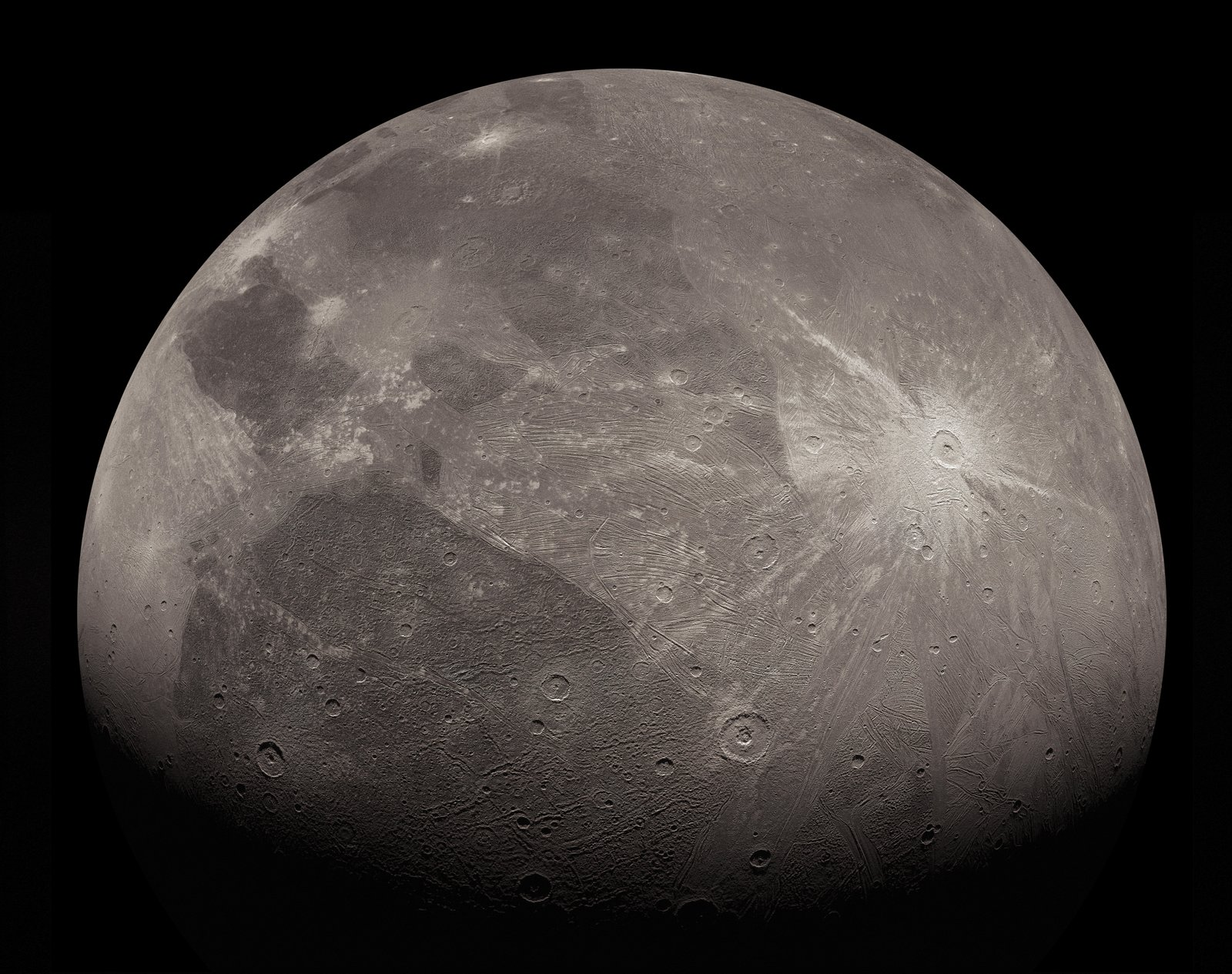
An enhanced image of Ganymede, featuring Neith (the multi-ringed dark crater near the top center, slightly to the left, below the ray crater Min), taken by the Juno spacecraft in June 2021.

== See also ==
- List of craters on Ganymede
- Meteor
