= Perrine Regio =

Dark region on Ganymede

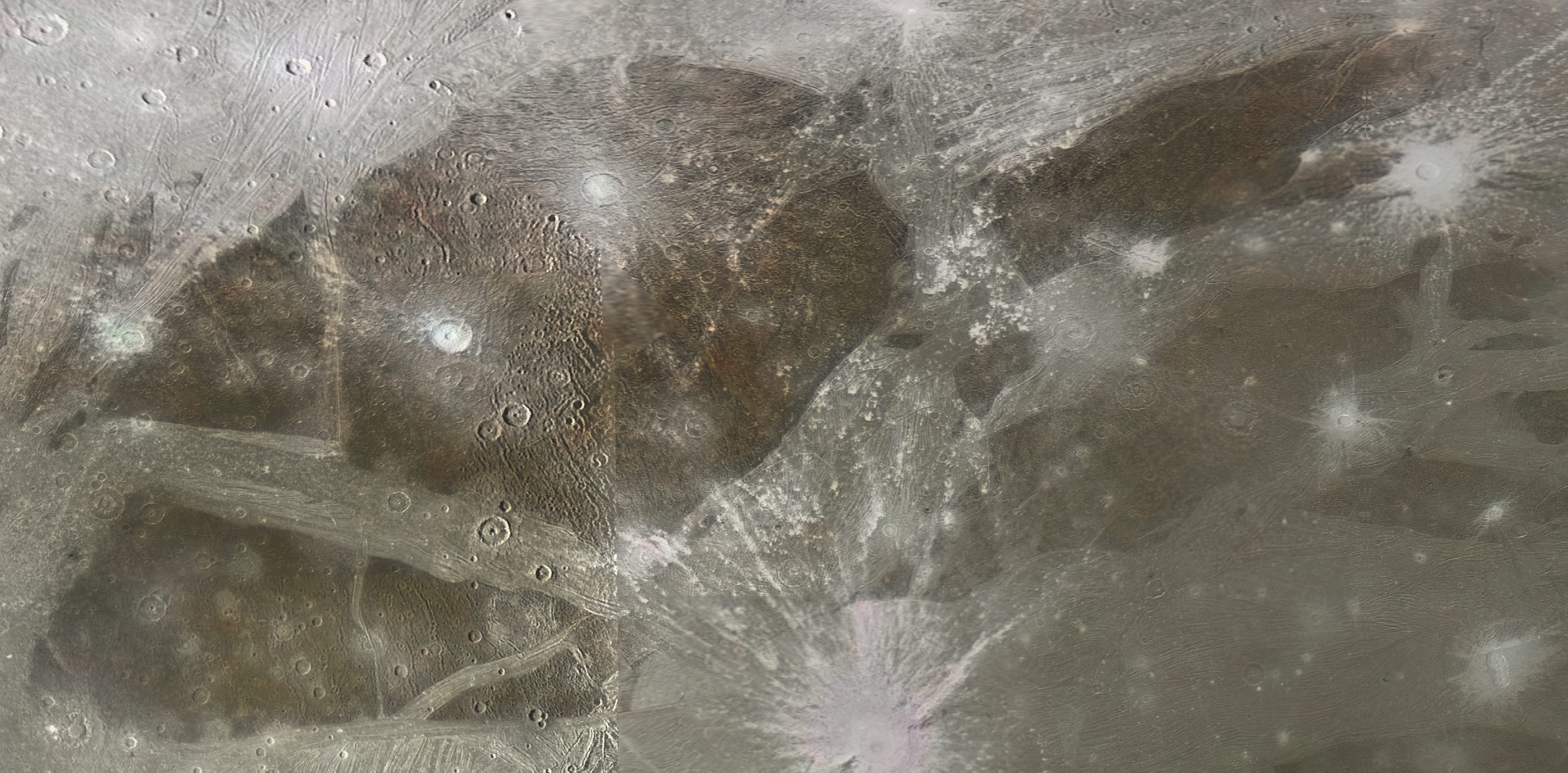
- A Mercator projection map of the dark Perrine Regio. The ray crater to its south is Tros
- Feature type: Regio
- Coordinates: 34.00°N 28.00°W
- Length: 3,200 kilometres (2,000 mi) (irregularly shaped)
- Eponym: Charles Dillon Perrine

Perrine Regio is a large, dark surface feature on Jupiter's moon Ganymede. It is an irregularly-shaped feature composed of several dark, older areas that are frequently dissected or interrupted by lighter, younger features.

== Naming ==
The International Astronomical Union (IAU) follows the rule that dark areas on Ganymede (regiones) should be named after astronomers who made significant contributions to the discover of Jupiter's moons. Perrine Regio is named after Charles Dillon Perrine, an American astronomer who discovered two of Jupiter's minor moons now called Himalia and Elara.

The name was approved by the IAU in 1979.

== Geography ==
Like most other dark regions on Ganymede, Perrine Regio is believed to be one of the oldest surface features on the moon. It is a massive, sprawling, irregularly-shaped area that covers most of the northern half of Ganymede's Jupiter-facing hemisphere. The dark, heavily-cratered regions on Ganymede are analogous to the brighter highlands on the Earth's Moon in terms of age as they are known to be the oldest parts of their respective moons.

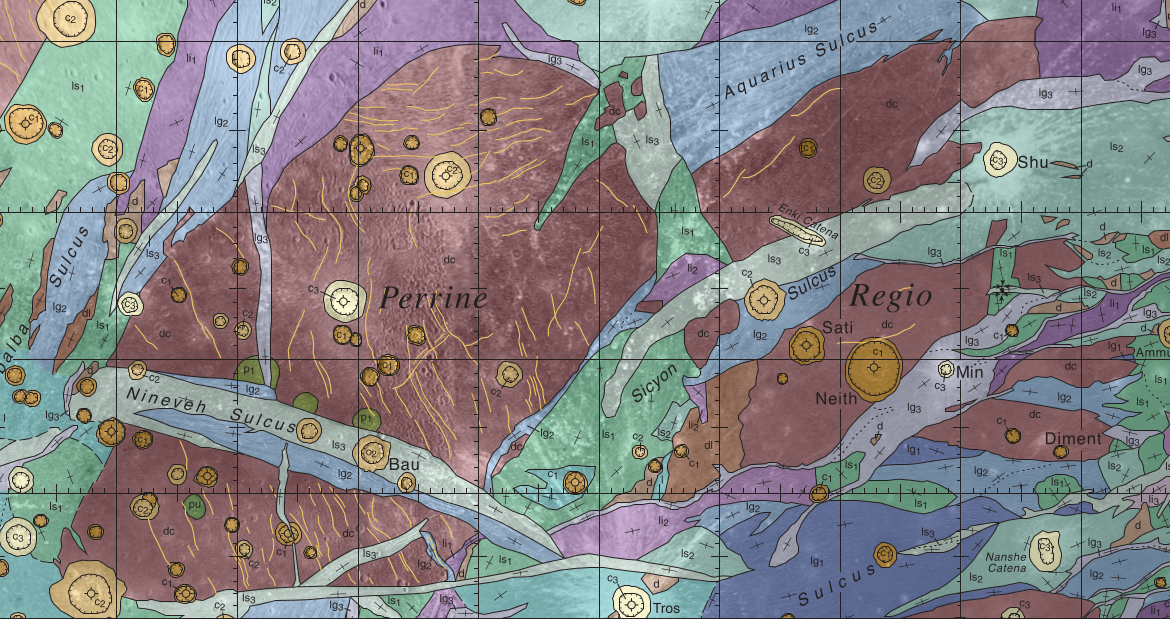
A color-coded geographic map of Perrine Regio. The colors help viewers to see the details of its chaotic topography more clearly. The dark red areas correspond to the dark, ancient areas of the regio.

The northern and central part of Perrine Regio contains the darkest sections of the feature and they probably contain some of its oldest terrain. Two unnamed, very bright ray craters can be found here. The fresh and bright icy material that were excavated from beneath Perrine's surface by these impact craters then reflects a lot of sunlight, creating a sharp contrast between Ganymede's light, younger areas and dark, older areas. Hundreds more unnamed craters pockmark Perrine Regio, but they either have no ray systems, or only their rims are covered by bright materials. To the south, some of the rays of the nearby ray crater Tros overlap parts of the regio.

The regio is sharply dissected into several parts by sulci such as Nineveh Sulcus and Sicyon Sulcus. These sulci are younger than the dark regions and they usually became brighter-looking as fresh materials (clean water ice, specially) welled up and spewed out from Ganymede's interior due to tectonic activities of some sort, effectively erasing parts of the darker areas of Perrine regio and replacing those parts with fresher, brighter materials.

Nineveh Sulcus dissects the western section of Perrine Regio into two—between its central-northern part and southwest part. Two named craters, Bau and Gushkin, are located within Nineveh Sulcus along with several other unnamed craters. The southwestern part of Perrine Regio is also divided into three parts by at least three unnamed smaller sulci.

Other unnamed sulci dissect Perrine regio into several more sections. These unnamed sulci are more numerous on the eastern side of Perrine than its west.

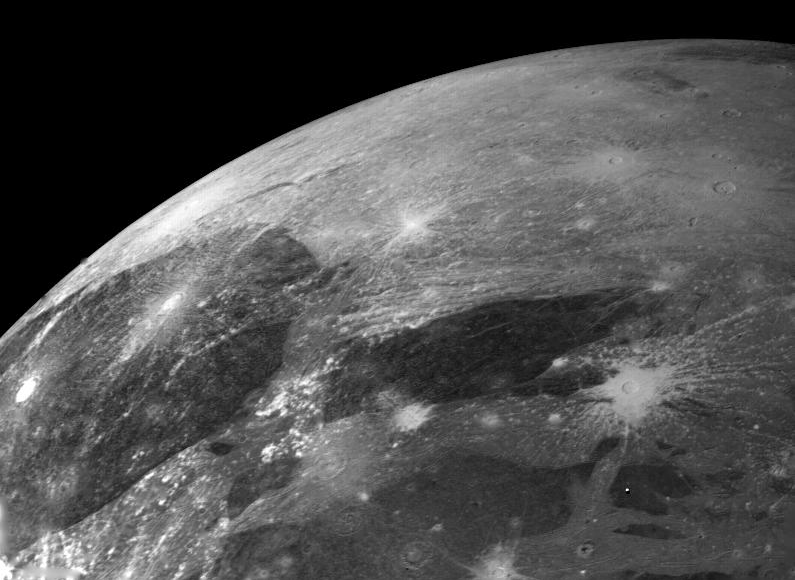
An image of northeast Perrine Regio, taken by Voyager 1 in March 1979. The bright ray crater to the lower right is Shu.

The eastern part of Perrine Regio is its most complex part. Dozens of unnamed sulci crisscross their way across this part of the regio in a chaotic manner, effectively splitting up the regio into at least a dozen sections (similar to islands on Earth). The northeastern part of Perrine is darker compared to the central eastern and southeastern section, suggesting that the latter has experienced more tectonic activities and surface renewal.

The southeastern section appears to be the most faded part of Perrine Regio as its dark areas are now barely visible, indicating that its dark materials have already been almost completely erased by tectonic activities in the recent past.

A handful of named craters such as Diment, Min, Neith, Sati and Shu pockmark the eastern region, as well as dozens of other unnamed craters. The eastern section is also the location of two of Ganymede's named catenae (crater chain), Enki Catena and Khnum Catena.

The Xibalba Sulcus separates Perrine from another regio called Galileo Regio to the west, while the Phrygia Sulcus separates Perrine from Barnard Regio and Nicholson Regio to the southeast. The Aquarius Sulcus marks the northeastern boundary of Perrine Regio. To the southwest lies a bright, halo crater called Laomedon.

The section of Ganymede's surface around the central part of Perrine Regio is called the Perrine quadrangle (designated as Jg2). It was named after the regio. However, the southwestern part of the regio is instead part of the Dardanus quadrangle (designated as Jg6), while its easternmost parts belong to the Nun Sulci quadrangle. (designated Jg5)

== Relationship to other Regiones ==
A 2020 study by Hirata, Suetsugu, and Ohtsuki proposes that Ganymede may have been struck by a massive asteroid or comet around 4 billion years ago. The collision was likely so powerful that it formed a global-scale multi-ring structure, surpassing the size of any known impact basin in the Solar System. By examining the concentric patterns of furrow systems in Ganymede’s dark regions—including those in Perrine Regio—the researchers concluded that Perrine, Barnard, Galileo, Marius and Nicholson Regiones are probably remnants of a single ancient basin or two basins, structurally similar to Callisto’s Valhalla crater but on an even larger scale. Over time, tectonic activity and resurfacing that resulted in the formation of younger, brighter grooved terrains (sulci) fragmented these dark regions into separate blocks and erased much of the original ring structure. Today, only the remnants of this colossal basin remain. If confirmed by future missions, this impact would rank among the largest known in the Solar System.

== Exploration ==
Several probes have imaged Perrine Regio in good detail. It is so massive that it can be seen even by Earth-based telescopes such as the Hubble Space Telescope. It can also be seen by amateur telescopes provided that they have enough resolving power to do so.

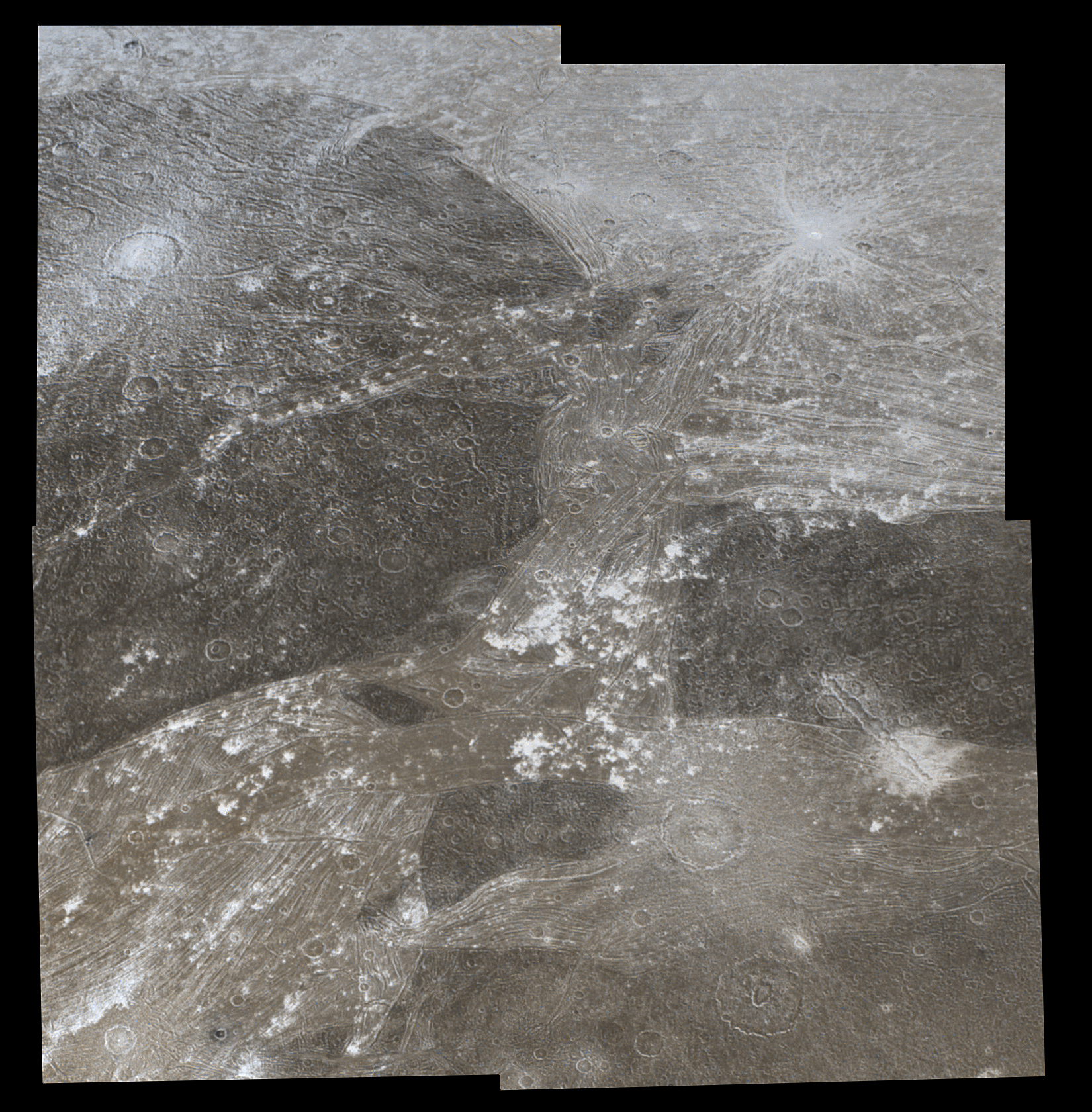
A mosaic image showing Perrine Region (upper part), taken by the Galileo space probe in December 2000

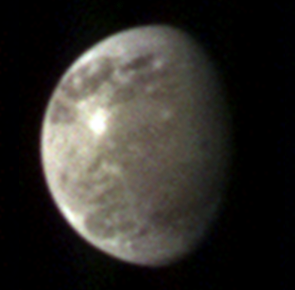
A low-resolution image of Ganymede showing Perrine Regio (upper left near the limb). Imaged by Cassini in December 2000.

Voyager 1 became the first probe to send back clear images of Perrine Regio in March 1979. It was able to see it close to the prominent crater Tros.

Galileo was able to image Perrine several times as it orbited Jupiter from December 1995 to September 2003.

During its distant flyby, the Cassini space probe was able to image Perrine Regio in low resolution, and the images were still clear enough to reveal some of its details.

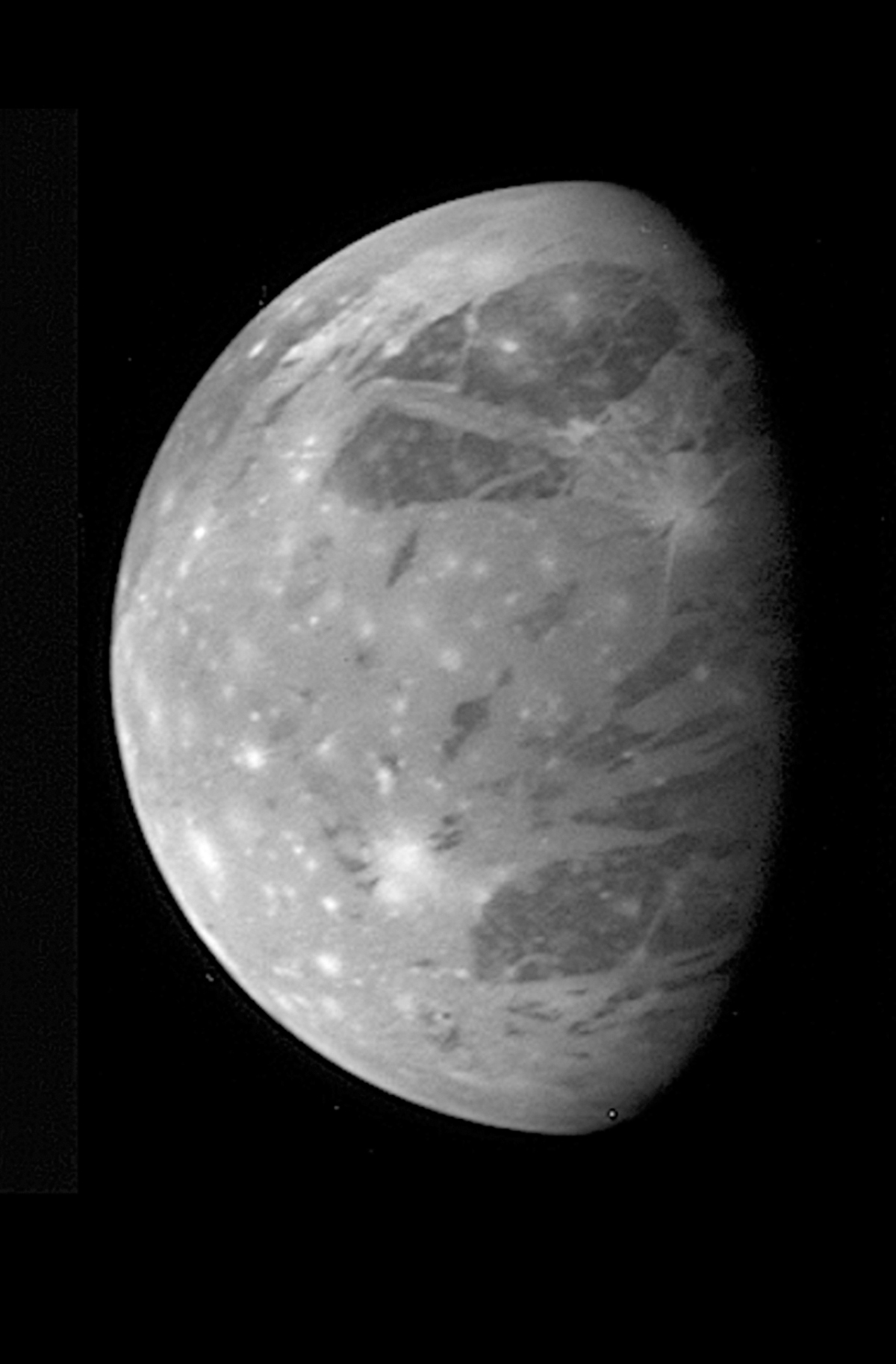
A greyscale image of Ganymede with Perrine (upper center) as seen in this New Horizons image, taken on February 27, 2007.

The New Horizons probe was also able to image Perrine Regio in better resolution than the Cassini probe in February 2007.

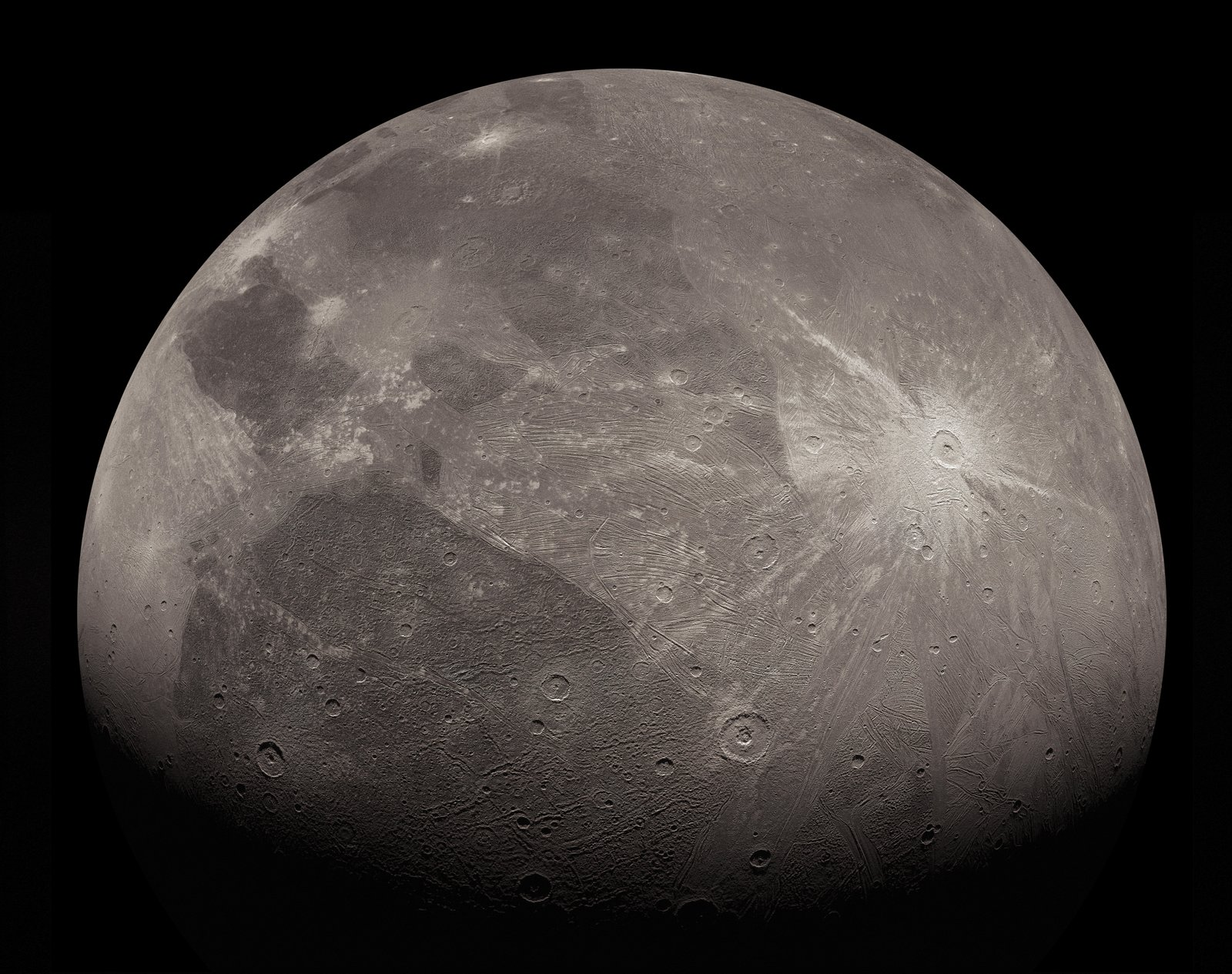
An enhanced image of Ganymede with Perrine Regio (lower left) taken by the Juno spacecraft on June 8, 2021.

As of 2025, the Juno spacecraft provided the highest resolution images of Perrine Regio during its Perijove 34 flyby in June 2021.

=== Future missions ===
The Jupiter Icy Moons Explorer (Juice), a space probe operated by the European Space Agency's (ESA), is scheduled to arrive at Jupiter in July 2031, and in December 2034, it is expected to enter into a low orbit around Ganymede from a distance of just 500 kilometres (310 mi). Juice is expected to be able to capture the most detailed images of Perrine Regio yet.
