= Serapis (crater) =

Crater on Ganymede

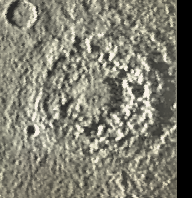
- A photo of Serapis crater, taken by the Galileo space probe on June 26 1997.
- Feature type: Anomalous Dome crater
- Coordinates: 12.40°S 44.11°W
- Diameter: 169 kilometres (105 mi)
- Eponym: Serapis

Serapis is a very unusually shaped dome impact crater on Ganymede, the largest moon of Jupiter.

== Naming ==
The crater is named after Serapis, a Hellenized (i.e. Greek) form of the Egyptian god Osiris, who was introduced into Egyptian mythology by the Macedonian Greeks after their conquest of Egypt in an effort to harmonize and unite their Greek and Egyptian subjects. Serapis was closely associated with healing, fertility, and the underworld — the last one paralleling Osiris's role as ruler of the Egyptian afterlife.

The International Astronomical Union (IAU) chose this name in line with the theme that surface features on Ganymede be named after deities, figures and places from Ancient Middle Eastern mythology, including Egyptian mythology.

The name was approved in 1997.

== Location ==
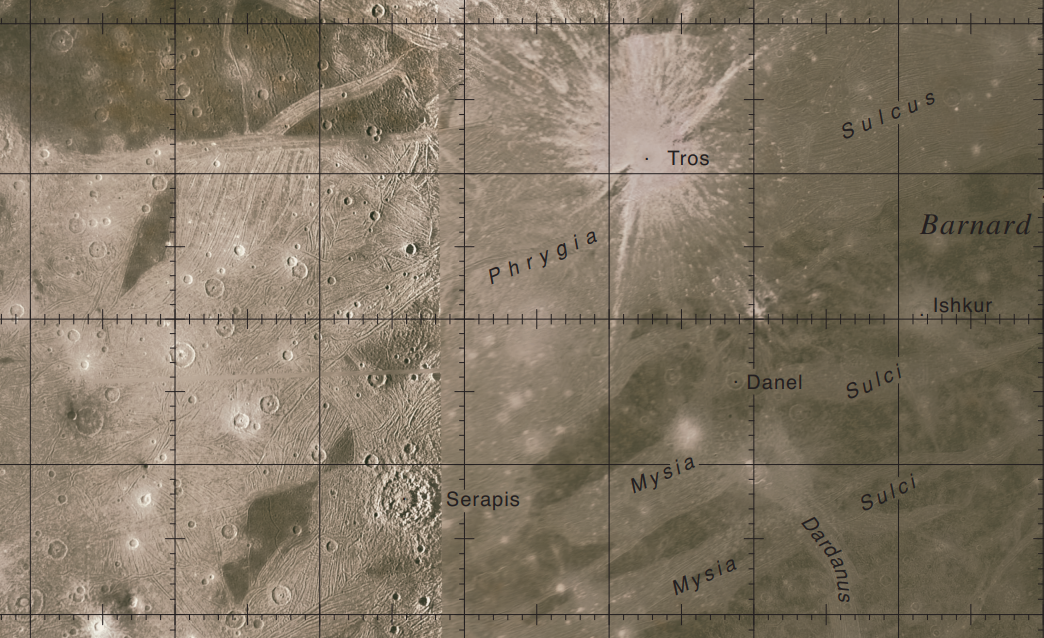
A map of the Dardanus Sulcus quadrangle, showing the location of Serapis crater.

Serapis is located a few kilometers south of Ganymede's equator, in between two bright grooved terrains — called Phrygia Sulcus to the north, and Mysia Sulci to the south.

To the crater's west is another extensive bright terrain called Babylon Sulci, while to the east is the dark, ancient area called Barnard Regio.

Serapis is located within the southern portion of the Dardanus Sulcus quadrangle (designated Jg6) of Ganymede. It is located on the hemisphere of Ganymede that permanently faces Jupiter as a result of the moon's synchronous rotation. Consequently, an observer standing within Serapis crater would see Jupiter nearly overhead at all times. (Note: For moons in synchronous rotation, such as Ganymede, 0° longitude corresponds to the part of the surface that always faces Jupiter. Regions between 90° W to 0° to 270° W longitude always face the moon's parent planet.)

== Morphology and Formation ==
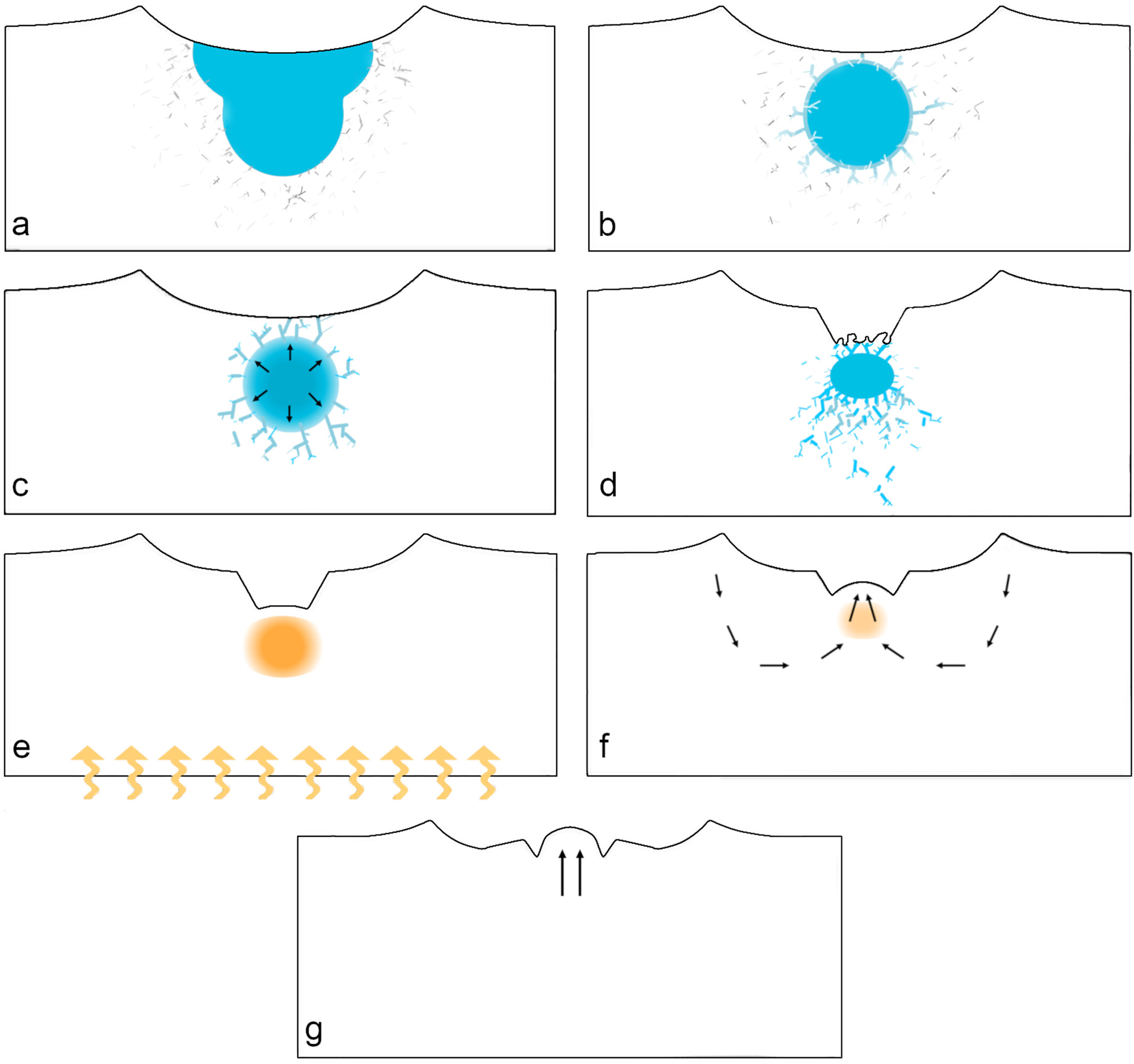
A diagram showing the steps in the formation of pits dome craters on icy moons. It shows how the refreezing of meltwater from meteorite impacts can cause both the formation of sinkholes and the dome-forming expansion of an icy crust.

Serapis is an unusual, anomalous dome crater on Ganymede. According to a short study by Dr. White, the icy Galilean satellites Ganymede and Callisto exhibit a wide variety of impact crater morphologies that differ significantly from those observed on rocky bodies like the Earth's Moon or Mercury. These differences are attributed to variations in impactor size and the physical state of the ice shell of the icy moons at the time of impact, including the presence of cold, rigid surface water ice, warm ductile ice at depth, and subsurface liquid water.

Smaller impact features, including pit craters and dome craters, are generally younger and display relatively high topographic relief. These features are interpreted as forming within a cold, rigid near-surface ice layer. Their characteristic central pits and surrounding annuli are thought to result from the drainage and subsequent freezing of subsurface pockets of impact-generated melt.

Larger impact features, such as anomalous dome craters like Serapis, typically exhibit reduced topographic relief and more subdued rims and floors. These craters are interpreted as having formed when impacts penetrated through the cold surface ice into a mechanically weak subsurface layer composed of warm, ductile ice.

Impact melt is thought to have played a secondary role in the formation of dome craters, which primarily result from the combined effects of deformation and relaxation within warm subsurface ice. Studies indicate that dome features formed when meltwater accumulated beneath a crater after impact heating melted the icy surface. As this meltwater refroze, it generated fractures and structural weakening beneath the crater floor, leading to collapse of the central region and the formation of a circular pit. Continued freezing of the meltwater then caused volumetric expansion—since water expands upon freezing—uplifting the crater's center into an icy dome and transforming the pit into a circular trench. Dome craters of this type generally occur only in craters with diameters greater than approximately 60 kilometres (37 mi).

== Exploration ==
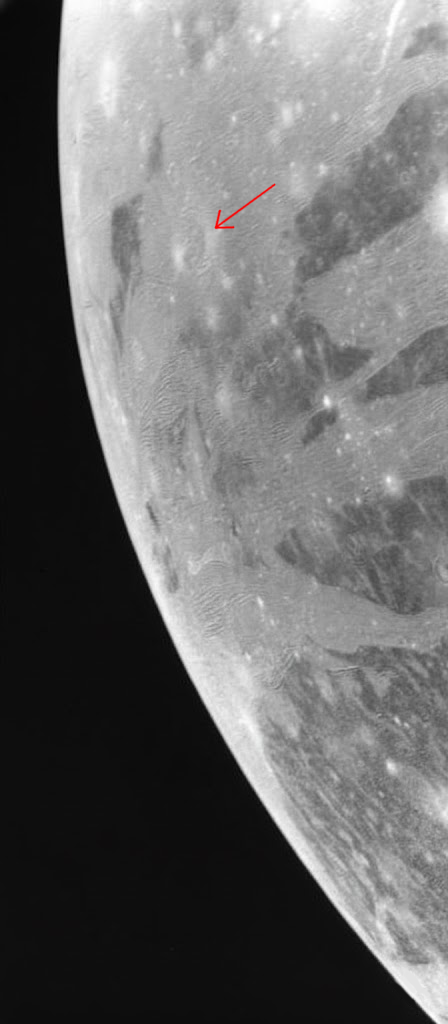
An image of Serapis crater on Ganymede (marked by the red arrow), taken by Voyager 1 in March 1979.

Voyager 1 became the first probe to return usable images of Serapis during its flyby of the Jovian system and Ganymede in March 1979. Serapis appeared in its images, but the crater was near the limb of the moon and the probe was too distant to capture any detailed images.

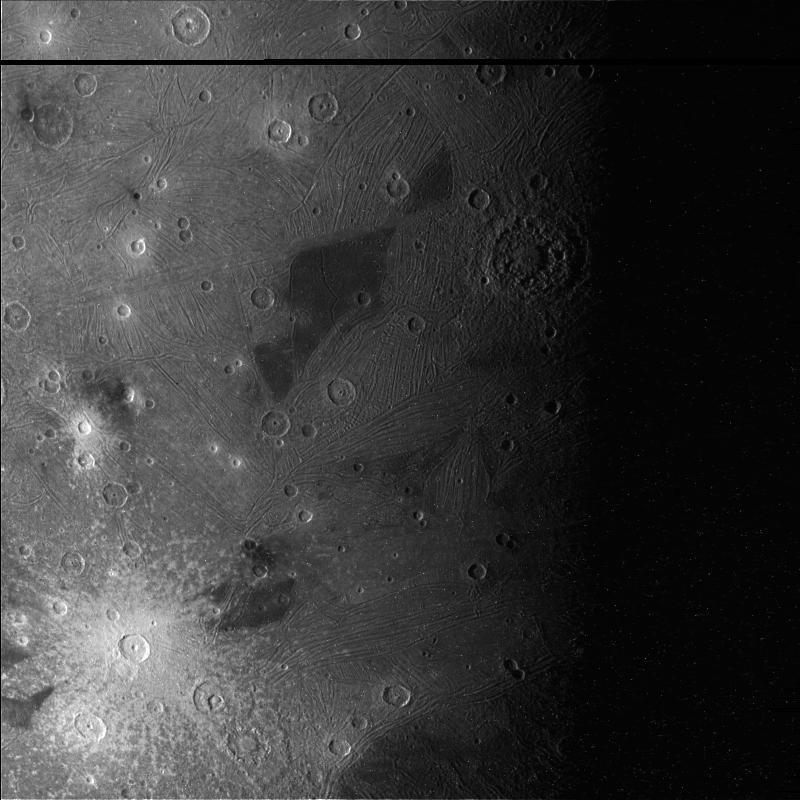
An image of the eastern portion of Babylon Sulci, showing Serapis crater in the upper right near the moon's terminator. This image was obtained by Galileo in June 1997.

As of 2025, Galileo is the only spacecraft that has obtained closeup images of Serapis with sufficient resolution to be useful for studying its nature, which it accomplished during its orbit around Jupiter from December 1995 to September 2003.

=== Future Missions ===
The European Space Agency (ESA) space probe Jupiter Icy Moons Explorer (Juice) is scheduled to arrive at Jupiter in July 2031.

In July 2034, Juice will settle into a low orbit around Ganymede at an altitude of just 500 kilometres (310 mi). The spacecraft is expected to return higher-resolution close-up images of Serapis crater.

== See also ==
- List of craters on Ganymede
- Meteor
