= Barnard Regio =

Dark region on Ganymede

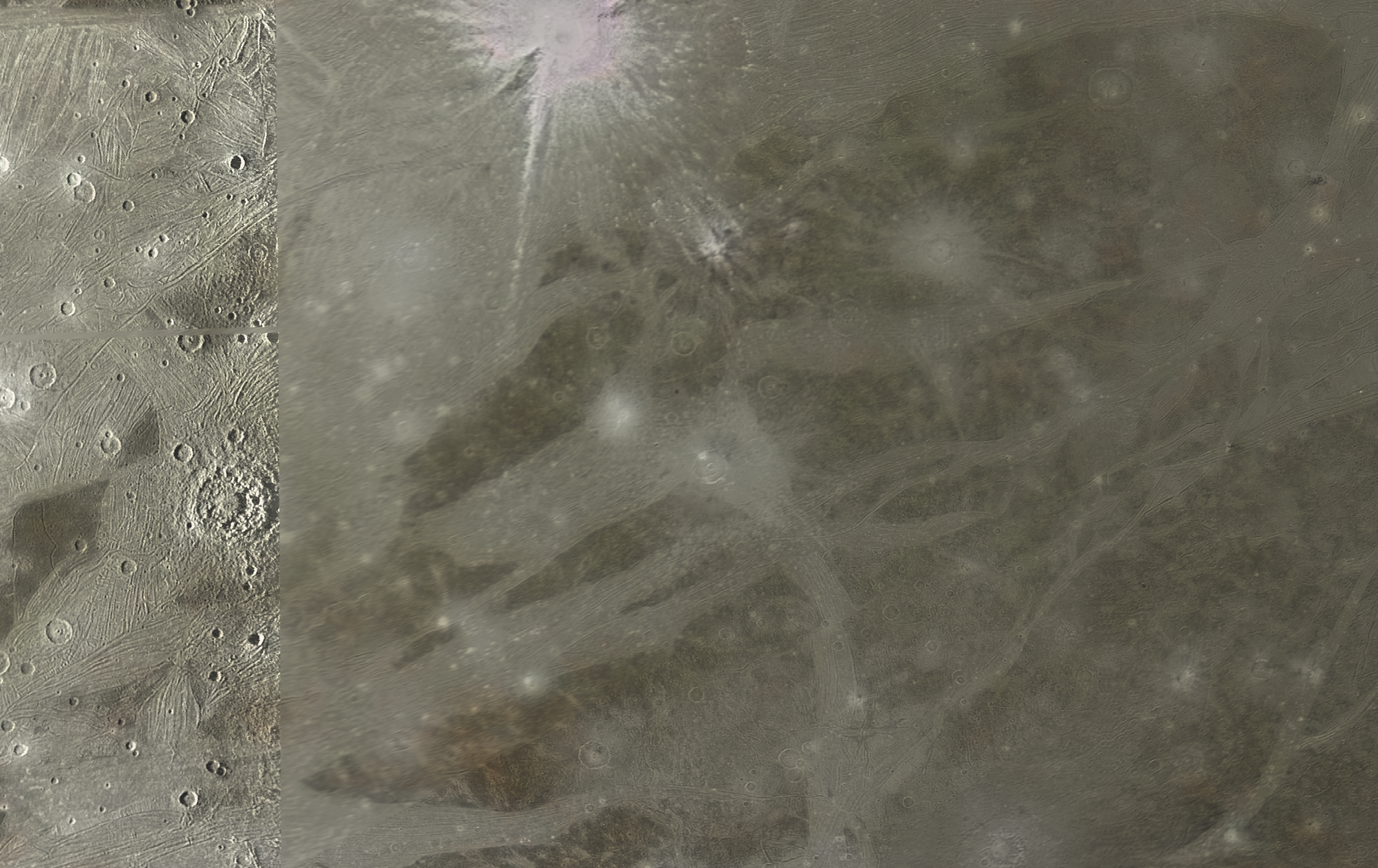
- A Mercator projection of Barnard Regio. The bright crater to the north is Tros.
- Feature type: Regio
- Coordinates: 6.80°S 11.60°W
- Length: 3,200 kilometres (2,000 mi) (irregularly shaped)
- Eponym: Edward Emerson Barnard

Barnard Regio is a dark, surface feature on Jupiter's moon Ganymede. It is an irregular feature composed of several dark, ancient areas crisscrossed by many younger, brighter sulci.

== Naming ==
The International Astronomical Union (IAU) has named the dark areas on Ganymede (known as regiones) after astronomers who made significant contributions to the discovery of Jupiter's moons. Barnard Regio is named after Edward Emerson Barnard, an American astronomer who discovered Amalthea—Jupiter's fifth largest moon, its largest minor moon, and the first Jovian moon to be discovered since Galileo identified the four Galilean moons nearly three centuries earlier. The name for Barnard Regio was approved by the IAU in 1979.

== Location and geography ==
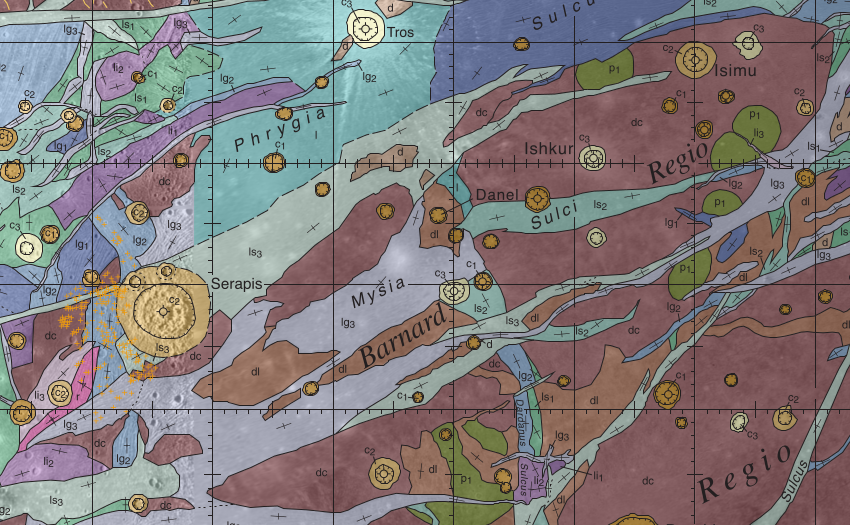
A color-coded geographic map of Barnard Regio. The multiple colors help viewers to see the details of its topography more clearly. The dark red areas correspond to the dark, ancient areas of the regio.

Barnard Regio is an irregularly-shaped area that covers most of the equatorial region of Ganymede's Jupiter-facing hemisphere. Like all other dark areas on Ganymede, Barnard Regio is believe to be one of the oldest areas of the moon's surface. It is a very rugged area covered by ancient dark materials probably accumulated from dark fragments brought by falling asteroids and comets.

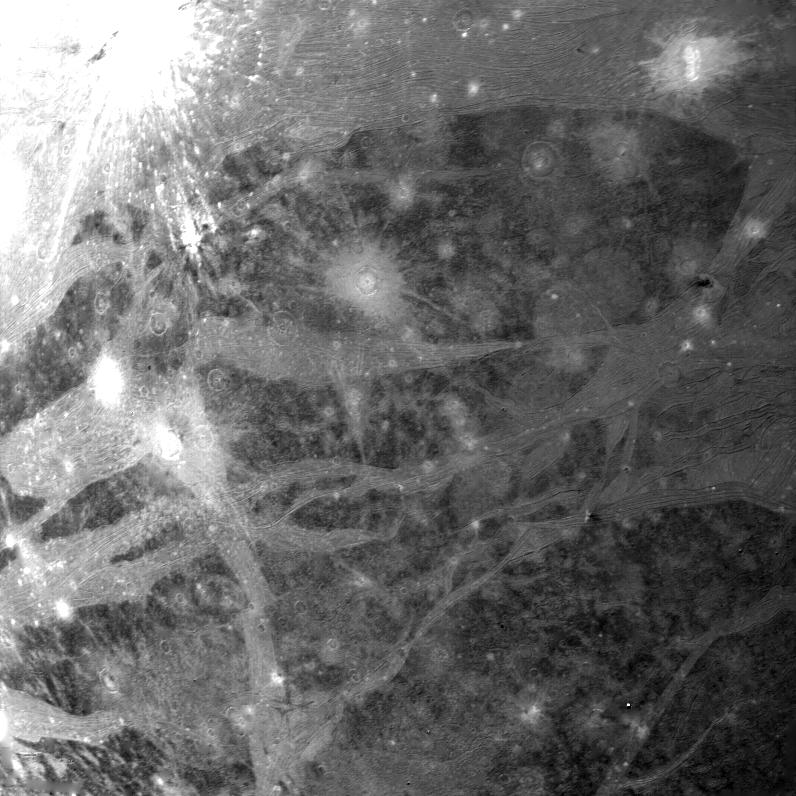
A greyscale image of Barnard Regio, taken by Voyager 1 in March 1979. The crater to the upper right is Tros, while Nicholson Regio is at the bottom. Barnard Regio can be seen broken into several sections

Barnard Regio is separated from Perrine Regio to the north by Phrygia Sulcus, and by an unnamed, narrow sulcus from Nicholson Regio to the south. Dardanus Sulcus divides the southern half Barnard Regio from north to south, splitting it in two parts; while the more complex and chaotic Mysia Sulci run from Barnard's northeast to its southwest, splitting the regio into many separate segments like islands.

There are several craters within and around Barnard Regio but only a handful have names. Within the regio, three craters are named—the bright ray crater Ishkur, and two fainter craters, Danel and Isimu. In general, craters without rays are considered older than craters rays.

To the regio's north is the major ray crater Tros, to the west is the prominent dome crater Serapis, to the northwest is the bright crater chain Nanshe Catena, and to the east is the rayless crater Misharu, and dark-ray crater Kittu.

Barnard Regio is located within the Dardanus quadrangle (designated Jg6) and Misharu quadrangle (designated Jg10) of Ganymede. A small part of the regio crosses over into the Nabu quadrangle (Jg 11) to the southwest.

Barnard Regio also contains the point where Ganymede's prime meridian (where 0° longitude marks the part of the moon that always points towards Jupiter due to the moon's synchronous rotation) meets its equator.

== Relationship to other regiones ==
A 2020 study by Hirata, Suetsugu, and Ohtsuki suggests that Ganymede may have been struck by an enormous impactor about 4 billion years ago. The impact was so powerful that it likely created a global-scale multi-ring structure, larger than any known impact basin in the Solar System. By analyzing the concentric patterns of the furrows system within the Ganymede's dark regions, including the furrows in Barnard Regio, they came to the conclusion that Barnard, Galileo, Marius, Nicholson and Perrine Regiones appear to be fragments of one single ancient basin, comparable in structure to Callisto's Valhalla crater but on a far larger scale. Over time, tectonic activity and resurfacing by the younger, brighter grooved terrain (represented by sulci) broke these dark regions into separate blocks and erased large portions of the original ring structure. What can be seen today are the remaining pieces of this ancient giant basin. If this hypothesis is confirmed by future missions to Ganymede, this impact would be one of the biggest known impacts in the Solar System.

== Exploration ==
Barnard Regio has been photographed by several spacecraft—Voyager 1, Galileo, Cassini, New Horizons and Juno.

Voyager 1 was the first probe to send back clear images of Barnard Regio when it flew by Jupiter and its moons in March 1979. On the other hand, Voyager 2 was not able to see Bernard Regio because its trajectory was designed to view the opposite side of Ganymede.

The Galileo probe was able to photograph Barnard Regio several times as it orbited Jupiter from December 1995 to September 2003.

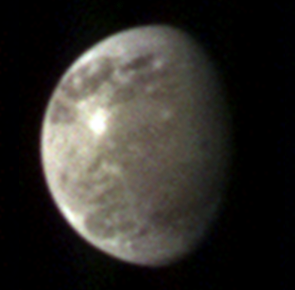
A low-resolution image of Ganymede showing Barnard regio (center) with the bright crater Tros (upper left) bordering it to the north. Imaged by Cassini in December 2000.

The Cassini space probe was able to image Ganymede from a great distance exceeding 10,000,000 kilometres (6,200,000 mi), proving low resolution images of Barnard Regio as it flew by Jupiter.

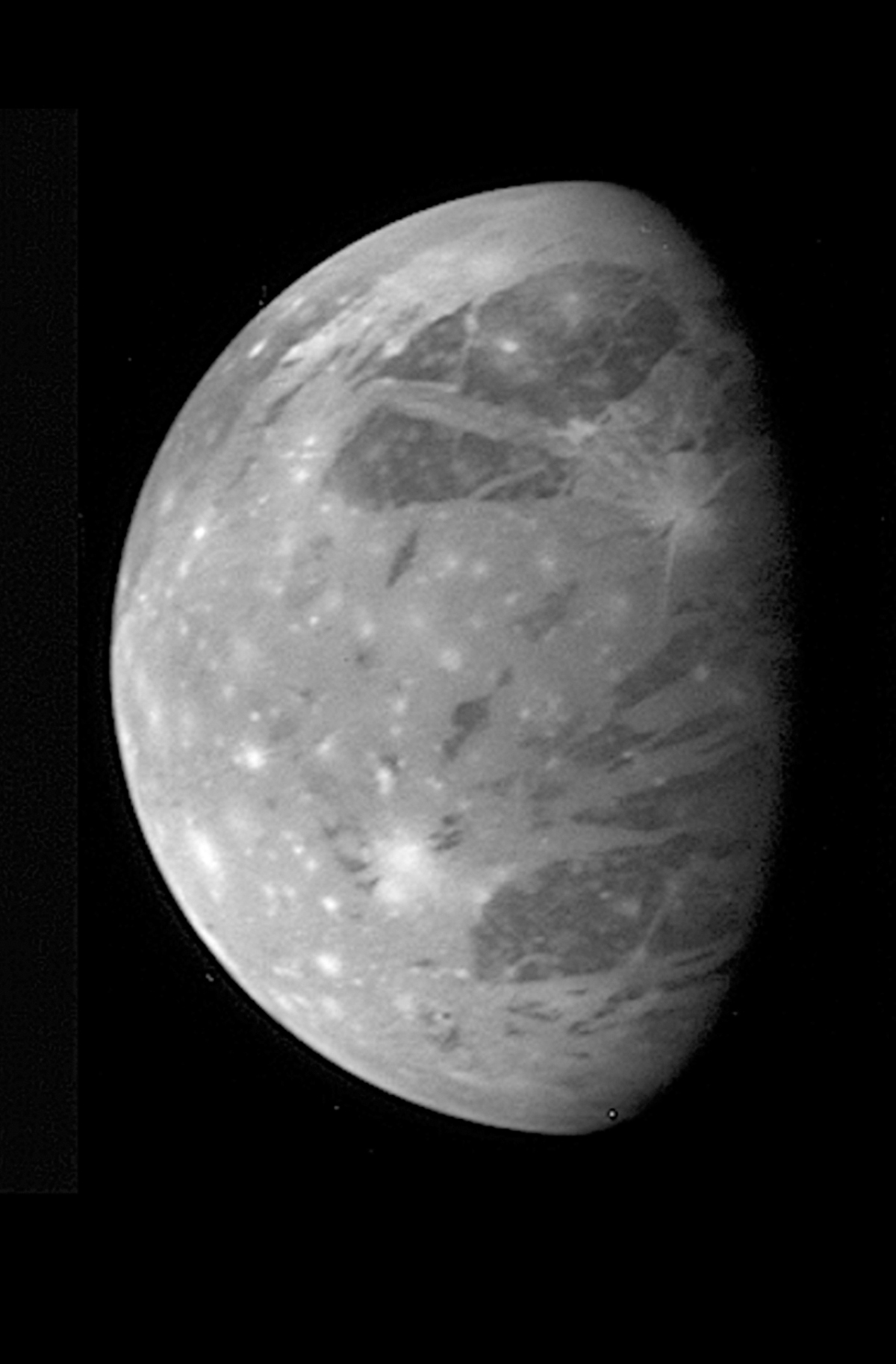
A greyscale image of Ganymede with Barnard Regio (center to the right) with parts of the regio in darkness as it crosses into the terminator) into the night side, as seen in this New Horizon image, taken in February 2007.

The New Horizon probe was able to photograph Barnard Regio in February 2007, but most of the regio was already in darkness when it flew by.

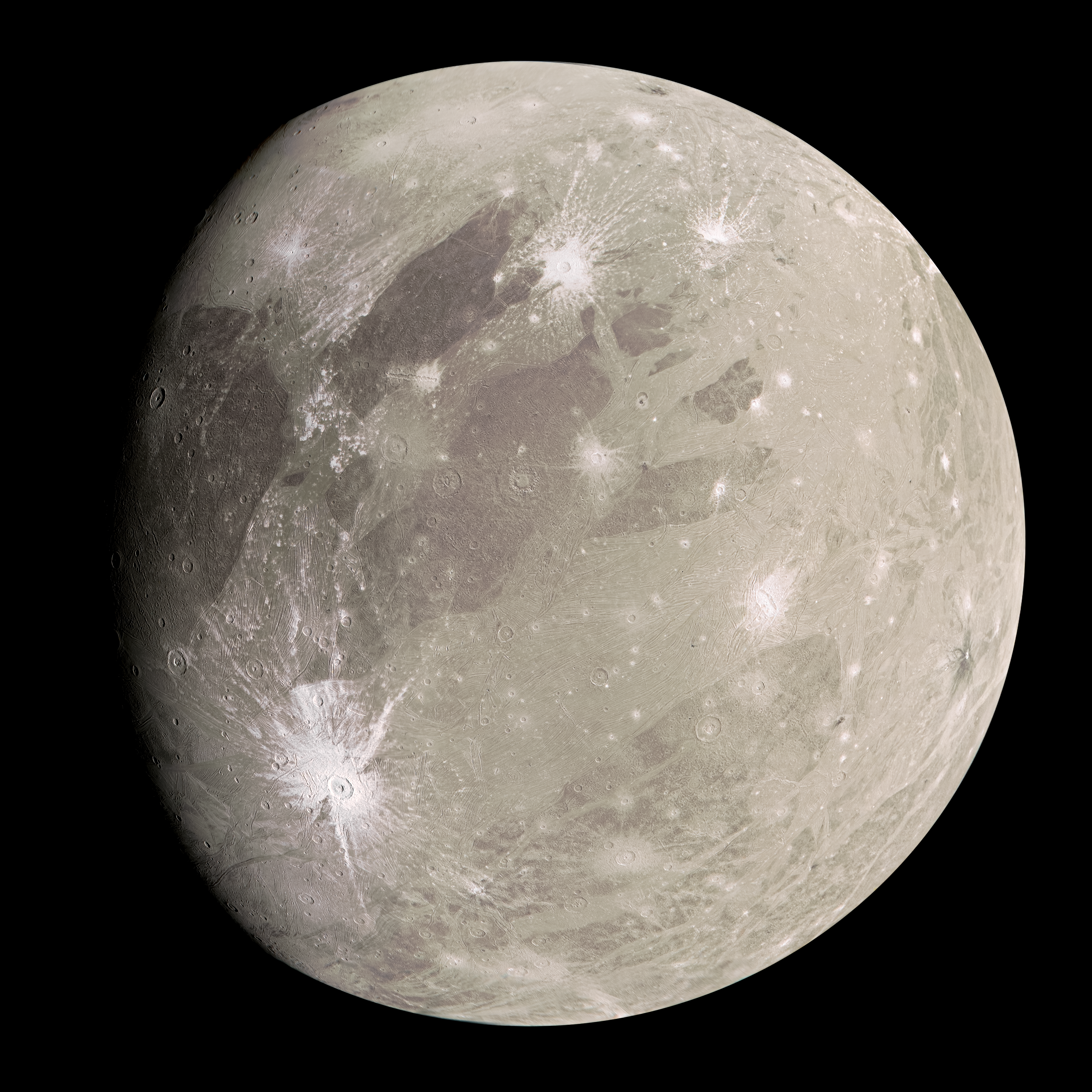
Juno was able to photograph Barnard Regio (bottom) from a low angle during its flyby of Ganymede in June 2021.

In June 2021, during its Perijove 34 (closest approach to Jupiter), the Juno spacecraft performed a single flyby of Ganymede to adjust its orbit around Jupiter. The space probe was able to photograph Bernard Regio from a low angle only as it was near the southern limb of the moon during its flyby.

=== Future missions ===
The European Space Agency's (ESA) is sending a space probe called Jupiter Icy Moons Explorer (Juice) to Jupiter. It is scheduled to arrive at Jupiter in July 2031 and after spending around three and a half years in orbit around Jupiter and performing multiple flybys of Europa, Callisto and Ganymede, Juice will settle into a low orbit around Ganymede at a distance of just 500 kilometres (310 mi). Juice is expected to be able to see Barnard Regio in even greater details than what Voyager or Galileo could manage.
