= Enki Catena =

Crater chain on Ganymede

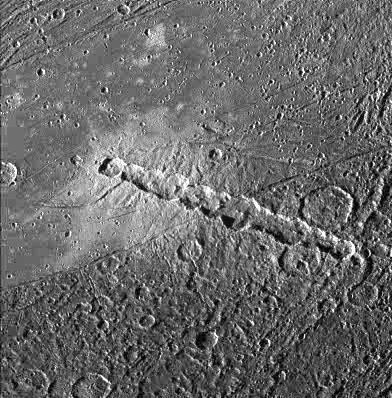
- An image of Enki Catena, taken by the Galileo spacecraft on 15 July 1998.
- Feature type: Catena
- Coordinates: 38.8°N 13.6°W
- Length: 161.3 kilometres (100.2 mi)
- Eponym: Enki

Enki Catena (formerly called Sais Facula) is a crater chain on Ganymede measuring 161.3 kilometres (100.2 mi) long. It is composed of thirteen individual craters that are overlapping each other, forming a line or chain.

== Naming ==
Enki Catena is named after Enki, the god of fresh water and wisdom in Mesopotamian mythology who rules over the Apsu or underground water aquifers of the world. He was the god who rescued mankind from the great flood that destroyed the world, and his wisdom also rescued Innana from the underworld. This name is in line with the rule set by the International Astronomical Union (IAU) that surface features and craters on Ganymede should be named after deities, heroes and places from Ancient Middle Eastern mythologies, which include Mesopotamian mythology.

The IAU approved the name for Enki Catena in 1997.

== Geography ==
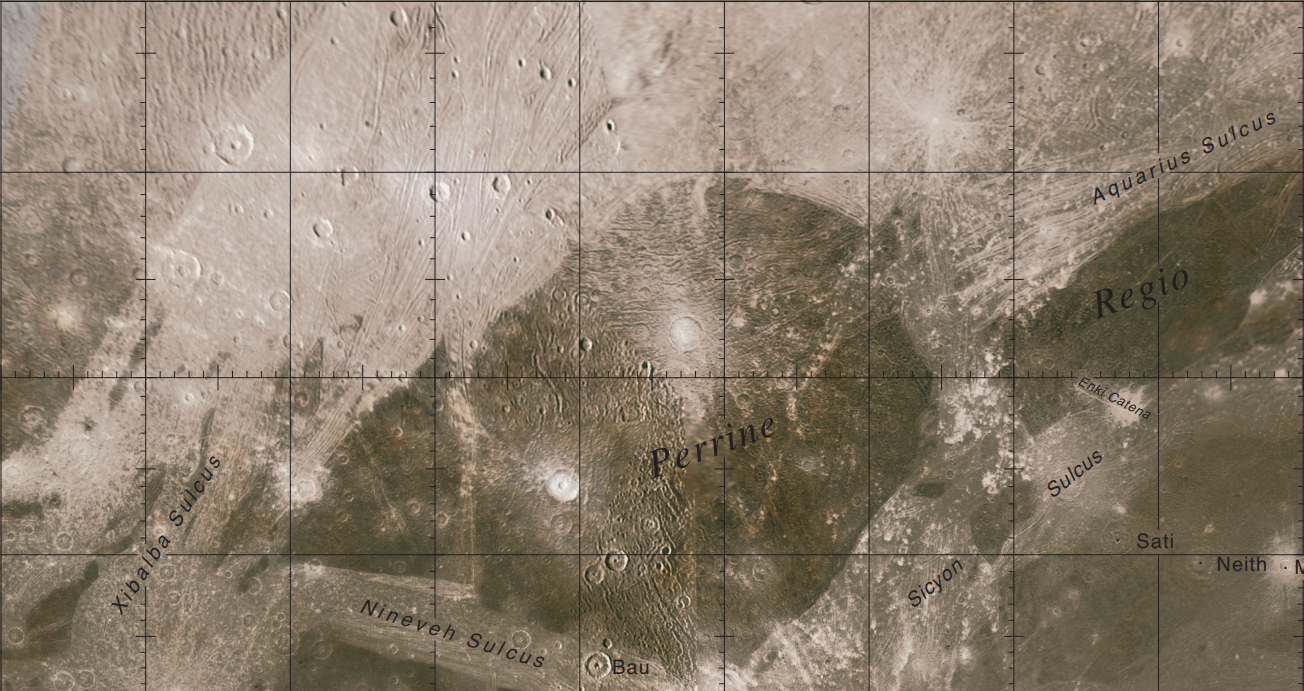
A map of the Perrine Regio quadrangle on Ganymede. Enki Catena is located on the eastern side of the quadrangle.

Enki Catena is located along the boundary between the dark region called Perrine Regio, and the brighter grooved-terrain called Sicyon Sulcus.

This chain of thirteen craters was probably formed by a comet that was torn into pieces by Jupiter's gravity as it passed too close to the planet. Soon after this breakup, the thirteen fragments crashed onto Ganymede in rapid successions. The lack of walls, scarps or division between each individual craters strongly indicates that the impacts formed almost simultaneously.

The impactors that created the crater chain landed across the sharp boundary between areas of bright terrain and dark terrain, delimited by a thin trough running diagonally across the center of the crater chain. The ejecta deposit surrounding the craters appears very bright on the bright terrain, forming a bright ray system. This bright ray system was known as Sais Facula on older maps, but the name has since been dropped. However, even though all the craters formed nearly simultaneously, it is difficult to see any similar ejecta deposit on the dark terrain. This may be because the impacts excavated and mixed dark materials into the ejecta, making the resulting mixture difficult to distinguish against the dark background.

Six of the impactor's fragments landed on the bright terrain, while seven landed on the dark terrain.

== Exploration ==
Three spacecraft were able to take images of Enki Catena—Voyager 1, Galileo and Juno.

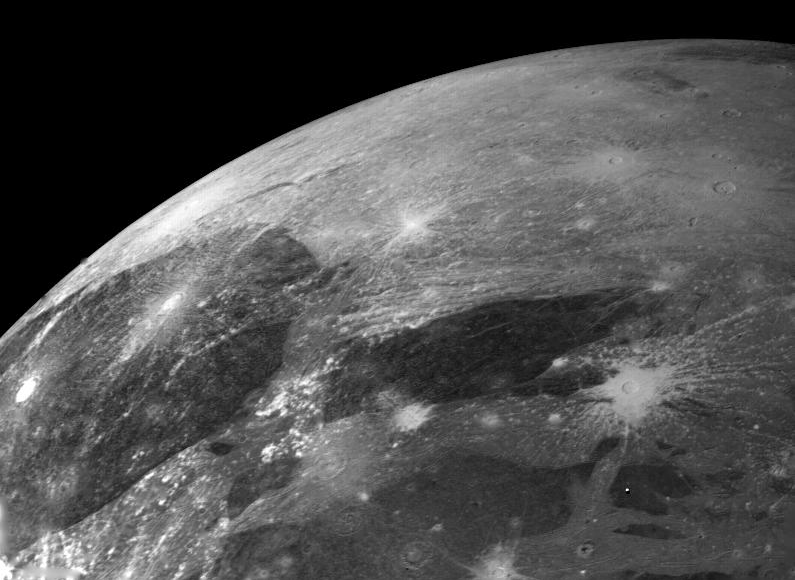
An image of Perrine Regio, showing Enki Catena slightly below the center of the image, taken by Voyager 1 in March 1979.

Voyager 1 only performed a brief flyby of Ganymede in March 1979, but it was enough to capture decent images of Enki Catena amongst the darker, ancient regions of Perrine Regio.

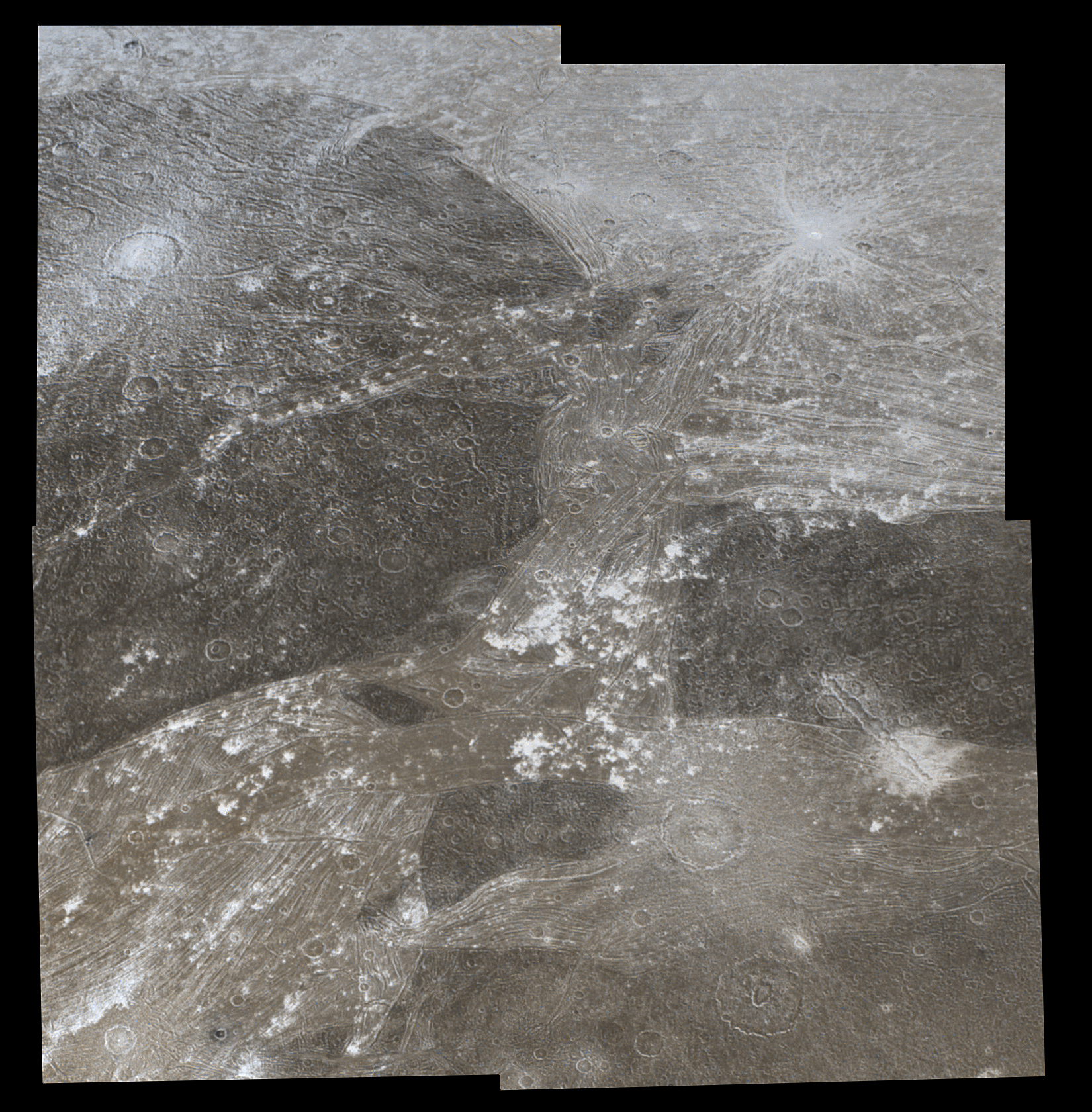
An image of Perrine Regio, showing Enki Catena in the lower right, taken by the Galileo spacecraft in December 2000.

The Galileo and Juno spacecraft, on the other hand, were able to send close-up images of Enki Catena.

Galileo was able to fly as close as 27,200 kilometres (16,900 mi) from Enki Catena, providing the first ever close-up view of the catena.

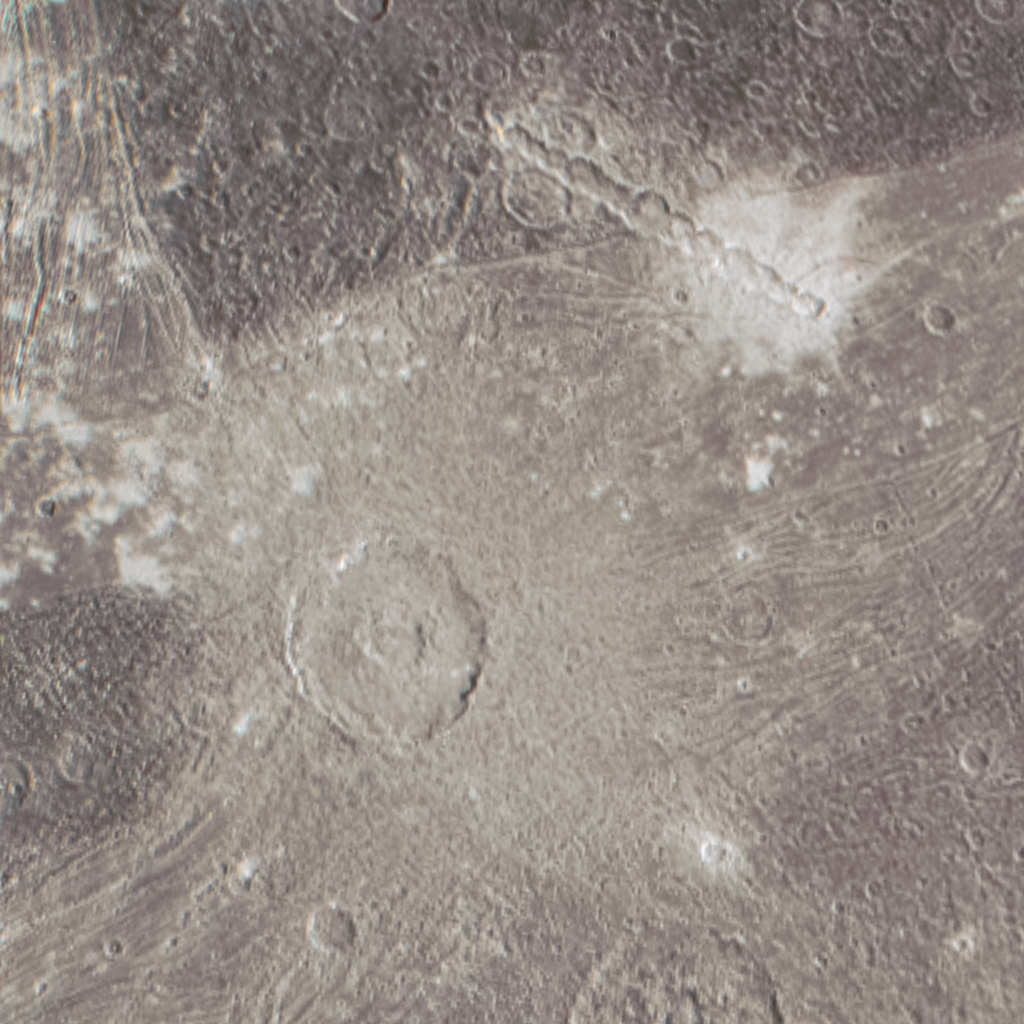
An image of Enki Catena (upper right), taken by the Juno spacecraft in June 2021.

In June 2021, during its 34th Perijove (closest approach to Jupiter during its orbit), Juno flew by Ganymede in order to adjust its orbit around Jupiter. The space probe managed to image Enki Catena from several angles.

== See also ==
- List of geological features on Ganymede
- Comet Shoemaker-Levy 9
