= Tros (crater) =

Crater on Ganymede

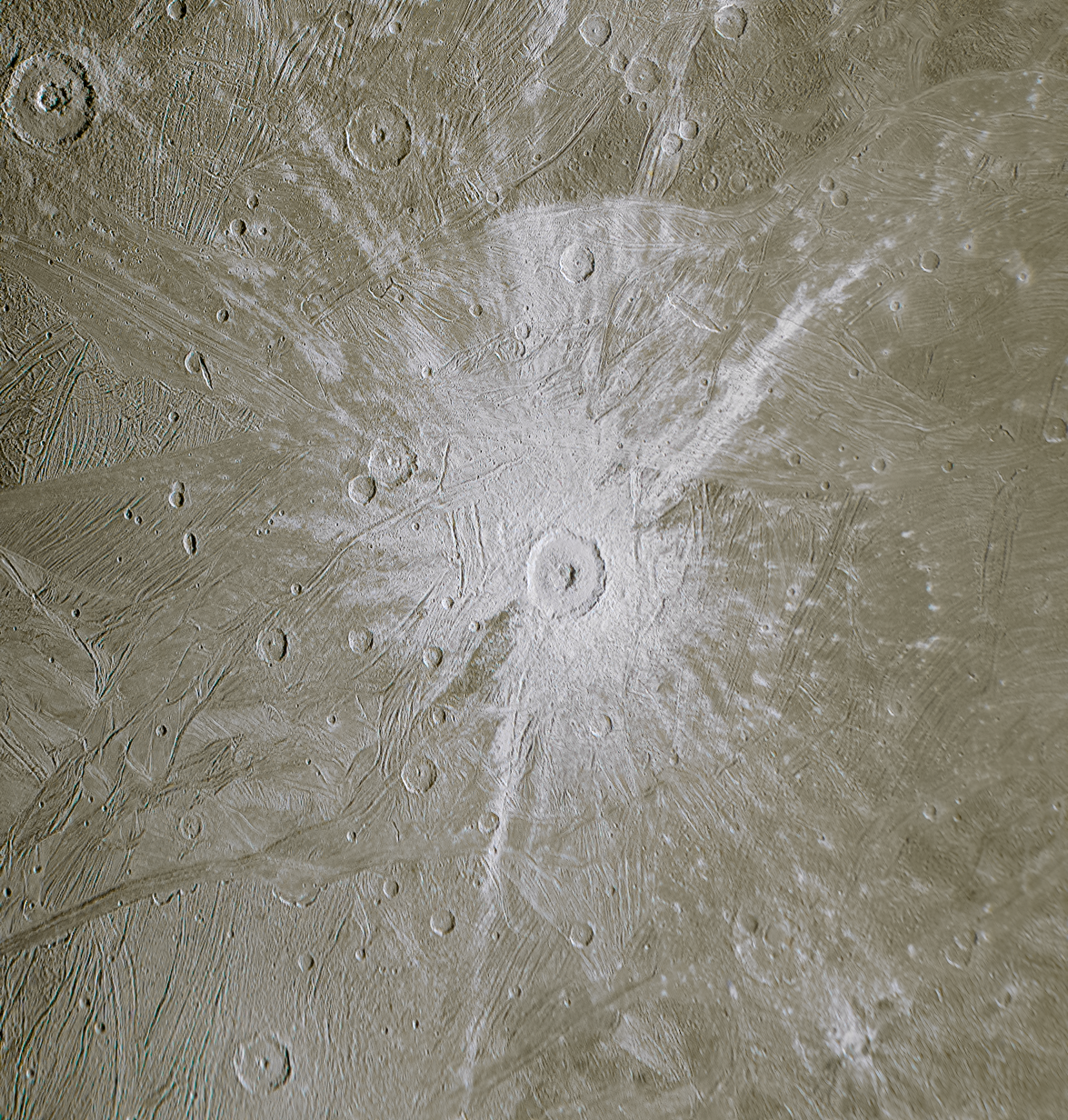
- A cylindrical map projected view of the Tros Crater on Ganymede, taken by the Juno spacecraft during its Perijove 34 on June 8, 2021.
- Feature type: Concentric ray crater
- Coordinates: 11.14°N 27.26°W
- Diameter: 92 kilometres (57 mi) or 94 kilometres (58 mi)
- Eponym: Τρως Trōs

Tros is a major crater near the equator of Jupiter's moon Ganymede. It is a concentric ray crater with two rims and very bright rays. The crater's outer rim is approximately 92 kilometres (57 mi) to 94 kilometres (58 mi) wide and it encompasses the smaller, inner rim.

== Naming ==
Tros is named after the mythological king Tros, the founder of the legendary city of Troy and the father of the handsome prince Ganymede from Greek mythology. Troy was named after this king. In one myth, Tros was saddened when Zeus (Jupiter in Roman mythology) abducted Ganymede to Mount Olympus to make the prince the cupbear of the gods, so the gods compensated the father by gifting him immortal horses. The gods also placed an image of his son in the sky as the constellation Aquarius. The name of the crater was approved by the International Astronomical Union (IAU) in 1979.

The IAU ruled that craters on Ganymede should be named after figures from either Ancient Near Eastern mythologies, or figures and places in Greek mythology that are related to Ganymede and the kingdom of Troy where he came from. Tros falls under the latter category. Other nearby features such as Phrygia Sulcus (a traditional region located near Troy) and Dardanus Sulcus also belong to the same category.

== Location ==
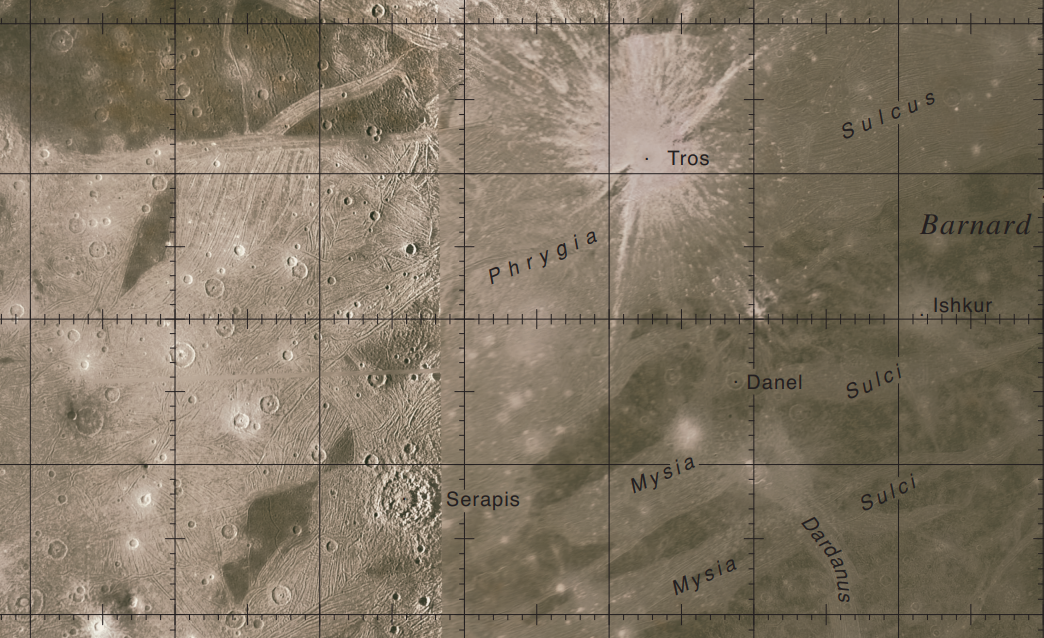
A map of the Dardanus Sulcus quadrangle on Ganymede. Tros is located within this quadrangle.

Tros crater is located entirely within the grooves of Phrygria Sulcus. To its north lies Sicyon Sulcus, while to the northeast is a dark region called Perrine Regio. To the crater’s south is another dark region, Barnard Regio, and a bright terrain called Dardanus Sulcus.

Tros is located within the Dardanus Sulcus quadrangle of Ganymede (designated Jg6). However, its northernmost rays are crossing over into the Perrine quadrangle (designated Jg2) to the north.

In addition, Tros is located on the hemisphere of Ganymede that perpetually faces Jupiter, a consequence of the moon’s synchronous rotation, which keeps one hemisphere constantly pointing toward its parent planet. This means that an observer on Tros will always see Jupiter almost directly overhead at all times.

== Morphology and Geology ==
Tros is a very bright concentric ray crater. It was probably created by an asteroid that is a few kilometers across, and it excavated massive amounts of buried ice from under the moon before scattering it in all directions which formed the rays. The inside of the crater and all of its rays are equally very bright and fresh-looking. As with most ray craters on Ganymede, the bright materials emanating from Tros are most likely composed of pure and fresh water ice. Fresh water ice reflects a lot of sunlight, causing it to appear brighter than the older surface around it.

It is considered to be a very young crater judging its bright and fresh ray system, and there are reasons to believe that it was formed more recently than the grooves around it base on how the asteroid that created the crater seem to have obliterated the grooves when it crashed into Ganymede. However, higher resolution images are needed to confirm the crater's actual age of the crater.

The high-resolution images of Tros obtained by the Juno spacecraft in June 2021 reveals that Tros has a raised rim and a broad, flat floor, featuring a 750 metres (2,460 ft)-deep central pit and a small residual central dome offset from the crater center. Its depth of about 1 kilometre (0.62 mi) aligns with previously measured depths of well‑preserved complex craters on Ganymede. Although most craters of this size exhibit larger central domes, the relatively small size of Tros’s dome is consistent with the observed variation in crater morphology on Ganymede.

Tros' rays stretch for hundreds of kilometers in all directions except toward the southwest, where there is an apparent absence of ray formations, and toward the east, where the rays barely exceed a length of one hundred kilometers. Several unnamed craters overlap Tros' rays. The rays also overlap with dozens of crisscrossing grooves of Phrygia Sulcus. Some of its rays, however, extend as far north as the dark, ancient region of Perrine Regio, creating a stark contrast between the dark and bright terrains. The rays likewise spill over into other groove-regions such as Nineveh Sulcus and Sicyon Sulcus.

None of the other craters in the vicinity of Tros seem to be exhibiting any rays.

== Exploration and Observation ==
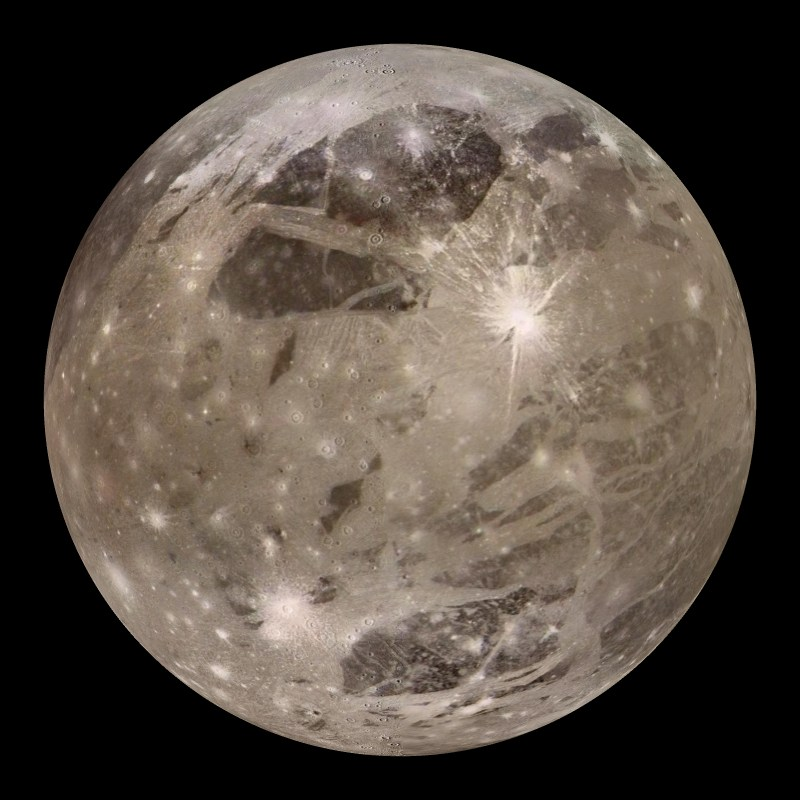
An orthographic image of Ganymede showing Tros crater (center and slightly to the upper right), taken by the Galileo space probe as it orbited Jupiter

Tros is a very bright surface feature which makes it easy to observe even from a distance. As of 2025, Voyager 1, Galileo, Cassini, New Horizons and Juno were able to image Tros in varying resolutions. It is also bright enough that it can be seen by the Earth-based Hubble Space Telescope and even by amateur telescopes with sufficient resolving power, despite the moon being hundreds of millions of kilometers away.

Voyager 1 was the first probe that sent back clear images of Tros when it flew by the Jovian system in March 1979. On the other hand, Voyager 2 was not able to photograph Tros because its trajectory was designed to view the opposite side of Ganymede as it visited the Jovian system.

The Galileo probe was able to photograph Tros several times as it orbited Jupiter from December 1995 to September 2003.

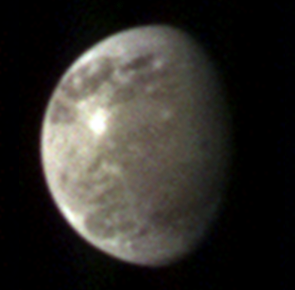
A low-resolution image of Ganymede showing Tros (upper left). Imaged by Cassini in December 2000. Despite the great distance, Cassini was still able to see the brilliant crater.

The Cassini space probe was able to take images of Tros from a distance exceeding 10,000,000 kilometres (6,200,000 mi), proving low resolution images of Tros as it flew by Jupiter similar to Voyager 1.

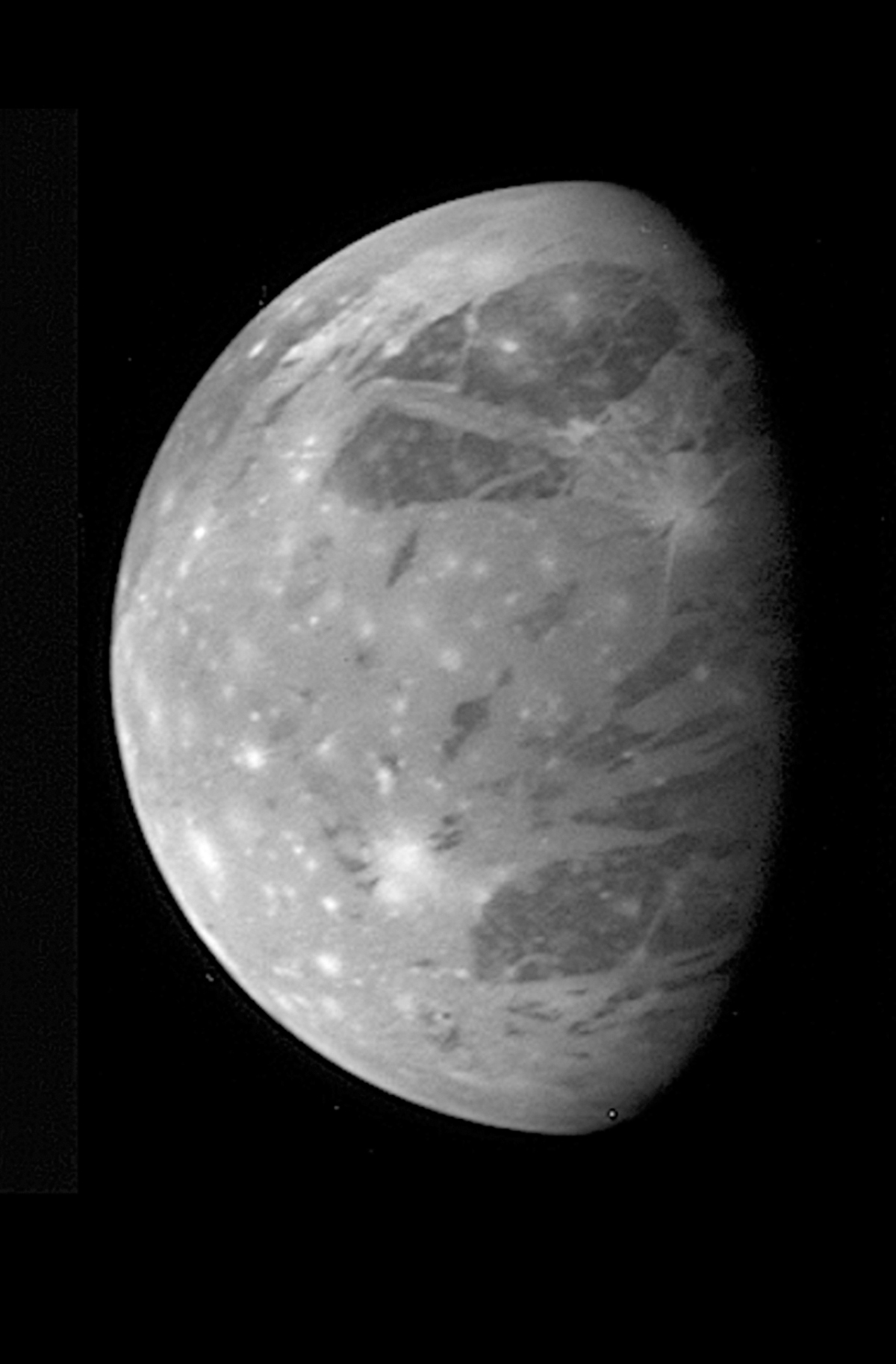
A greyscale image of Ganymede with Tros (upper right near the terminator) as seen in this New Horizon image, taken on February 27, 2007.

The New Horizon probe was able to photograph Tros in more reasonable detail as it flew by Jupiter in February 2007 for a gravity assist to Pluto.

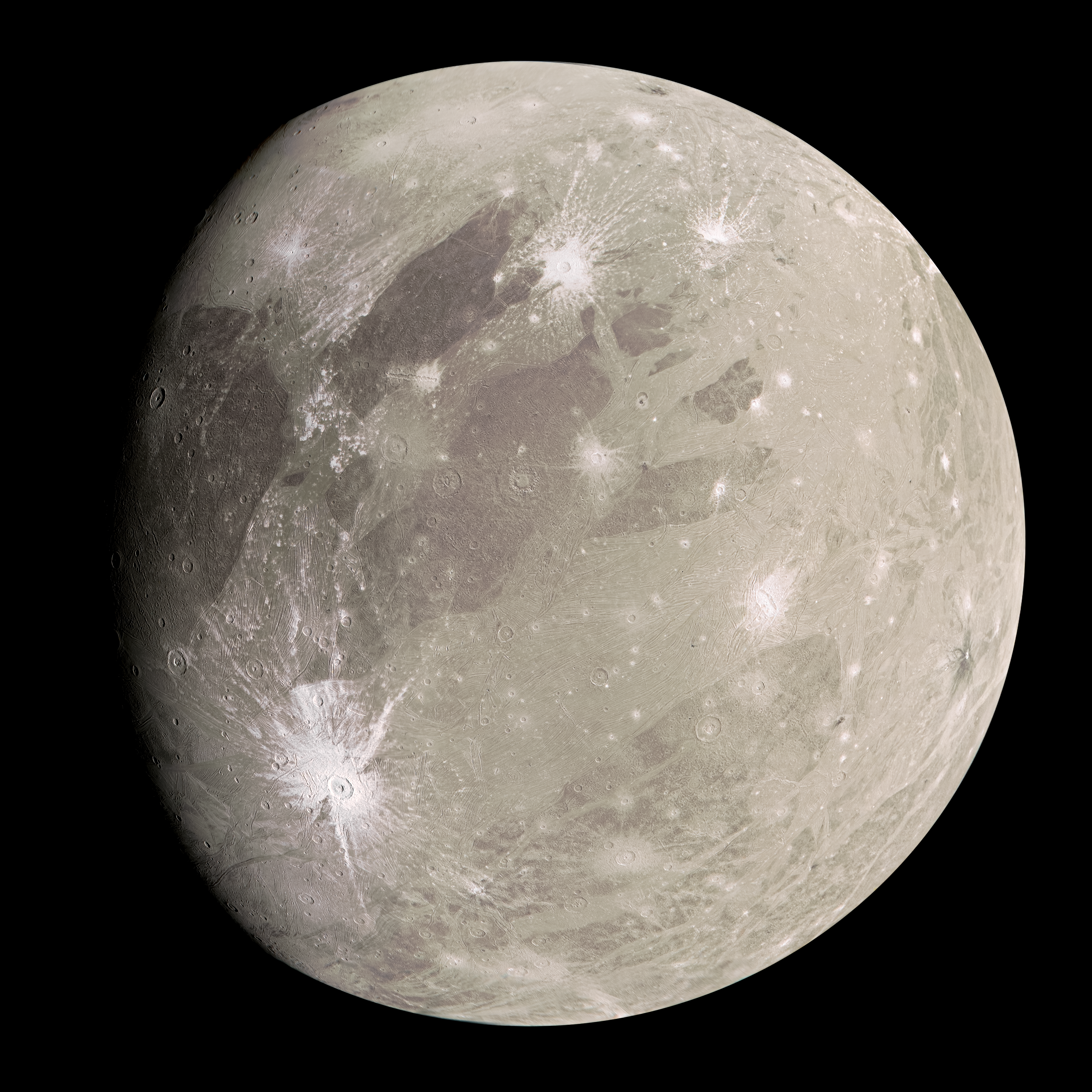
Tros crater (lower left) as seen in this global image of Ganymede taken by the Juno spacecraft on June 8, 2021

In June 2021, during its Perijove 34 (closest approach to Jupiter), the Juno spacecraft performed a single flyby of Ganymede in order to adjust the length of its orbit around Jupiter. The space probe was able to photograph Tros in great details. As of 2025, these are the highest-resolution images of Tros that are available.

=== Future missions ===
The European Space Agency's (ESA) Jupiter Icy Moons Explorer (Juice) is scheduled to arrive at Jupiter in July 2031. After spending around three and a half years in orbit around Jupiter and performing multiple flybys of Europa, Callisto and Ganymede, Juice will settle into a low orbit around Ganymede at a distance of just 500 kilometres (310 mi). Juice will be able to photograph Tros at higher resolutions, allowing scientists to determine a more accurate age for the crater.

== See also ==
- List of craters on Ganymede
- Meteor
