= Ptah (crater) =

Crater on Ganymede

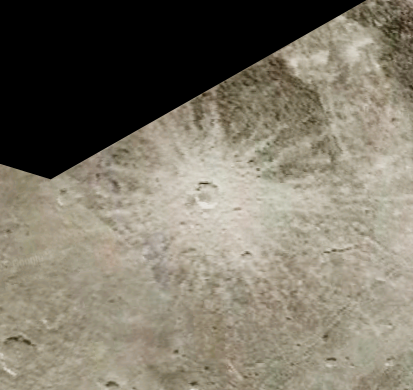
- A low resolution mosaic image of Ptah, a relatively small crater with bright rays, taken by Voyager 2 on 9 July 1979.
- Feature type: Ray crater
- Coordinates: 65.90°S 217.05°W
- Diameter: 30 kilometres (19 mi)
- Eponym: Ptah

Ptah is a crater on Ganymede, the largest moon in the Jovian system. It is a small crater with a bright and well-defined ray system, making it one of the brightest features on the moon. Ptah is located slightly more than two-thirds of the distance from equator of the moon to its south pole.

== Naming ==
Ptah is named after the Egyptian god Ptah, the sovereign and chief god of Memphis, which became one of Egypt's greatest capital cities for many centuries. Some Ancient Egyptians believed that he created the universe using his words and he created every other gods and goddesses. He was married to Sekhmet, a lion-headed goddess of war and they had a son named Nefertem, a god of beauty and perfumes. Ptah later became the patron god of craftsmen and the arts which reflected his role as a creator deity.

Ptah's naming follows the rule laid down by the International Astronomical Union's (IAU) that craters and features on Ganymede should be named after deities, heroes, and places from Ancient Middle Eastern mythologies, which includes Egyptian mythology. Other nearby craters such Anubis and Osiris follow the convention. Ptah's name was approved by the IAU in 1988.

== Location ==
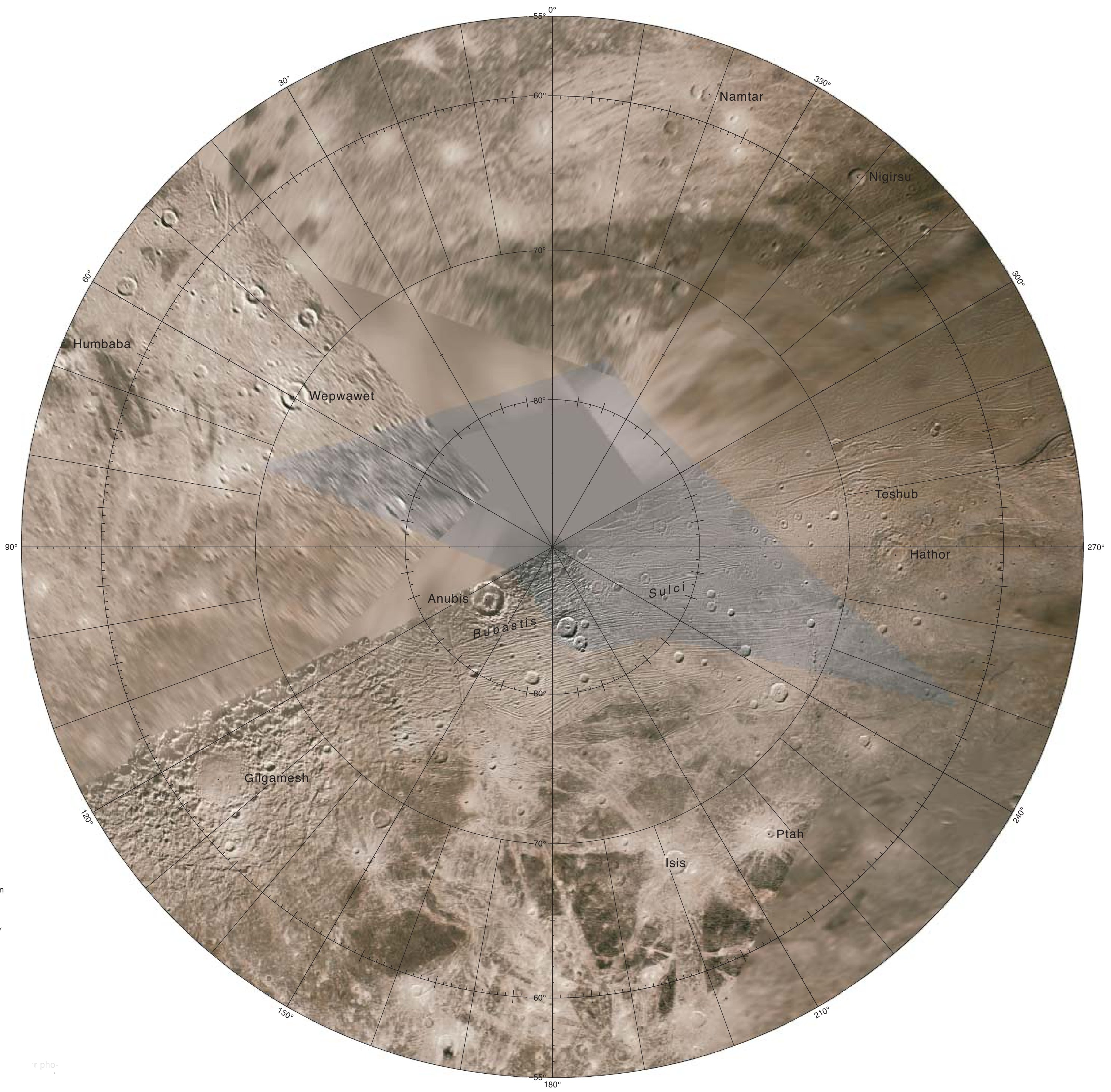
A map of the south polar region of Ganymede. It shows the areas under the Hathor quadrangle and the location of Ptah crater, which is at the bottom part of the map.

Ptah is located in the southern hemisphere of Ganymede. To the east of Ptah is another bright and larger crater named Isis.Several unnamed craters surround Ptah, obscuring many parts of its crater ray. However, they are all unnamed. To Ptah's south, the extensive grooved terrain of Bubastis Sulci extends across the surface between the crater and Ganymede's south pole.

Ptah is located within the Hathor quadrangle (designated Jg15), the quadrangle that surrounds the south pole of Ganymede. The hemisphere of Ganymede where Ptah is located never faces Jupiter as a consequence of the moon's synchronous rotation around its parent planet. This means that an observer at Ptah will never see Jupiter in the sky. (Note: For moons in synchronous rotation, such as Ganymede, 0° longitude corresponds to the part of the surface that always faces Jupiter. Regions between 90° W and 270° W longitude never face the moon's parent planet.)

== Geology ==
Ptah is a bright and young-looking crater on Ganymede. It is only around 30 kilometres (19 mi) in diameter, but the asteroid or comet that created the crater was able to excavate and fling around a decent amount of fresher, brighter materials from beneath Ganymede's surface. The secondary projectiles that were created and thrown out after the asteroid impact seem to have evenly spread in all directions from the impact site, causing the ray system to look very symmetrical.

The asteroid that formed Ptah seems to have landed on a dark region on Ganymede (called a regio). Dark regions on Ganymede are considered as the most ancient parts of the moon's surface, and the more recent impact seems to have erased part of older, darker regio—covering it with younger, fresher materials (probably mostly clean water ice). The freshly excavated ice then reflects a lot of sunlight, making the rays look brighter than the surrounding older, darker areas.

== Exploration ==
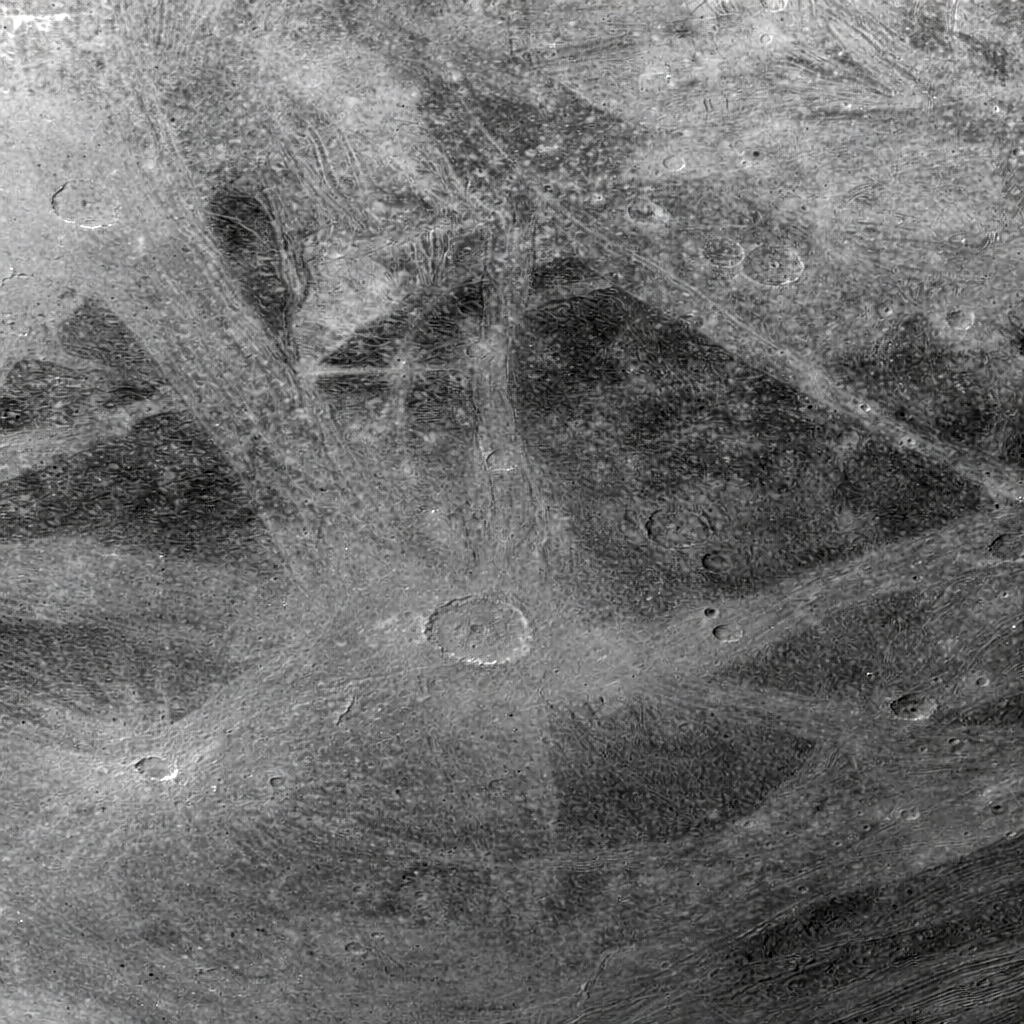
An image Ptah (lower left), along with Isis (center), taken by Voyager 2 in July 1979.

The only spacecraft to see and photograph Ptah was Voyager 2 when it flyby Jupiter and Ganymede in July 1979. The crater's position near the south pole makes it challenging for any spacecraft flying by on a trajectory along the Solar System's ecliptic plane to view the crater. Voyager 2's slightly southward trajectory toward the next planet, Saturn, allowed it to photograph Ganymede's south pole, returning the first-ever images of Ptah.

=== Future missions ===
The European Space Agency's (ESA) Jupiter Icy Moons Explorer (Juice) orbiter, which was launched in April 2023, is scheduled to arrive at Jupiter in July 2031. After spending approximately three and a half years orbiting Jupiter and performing multiple flybys of Europa, Callisto, and Ganymede, Juice will settle into a low polar orbit around Ganymede, allowing the probe to view Ganymede's poles at high image resolution multiple times. This orbit is also expected to cover Ptah.

== See also ==
- List of craters on Ganymede
- Meteor
