= Bubastis Sulci =

Bright region on Ganymede

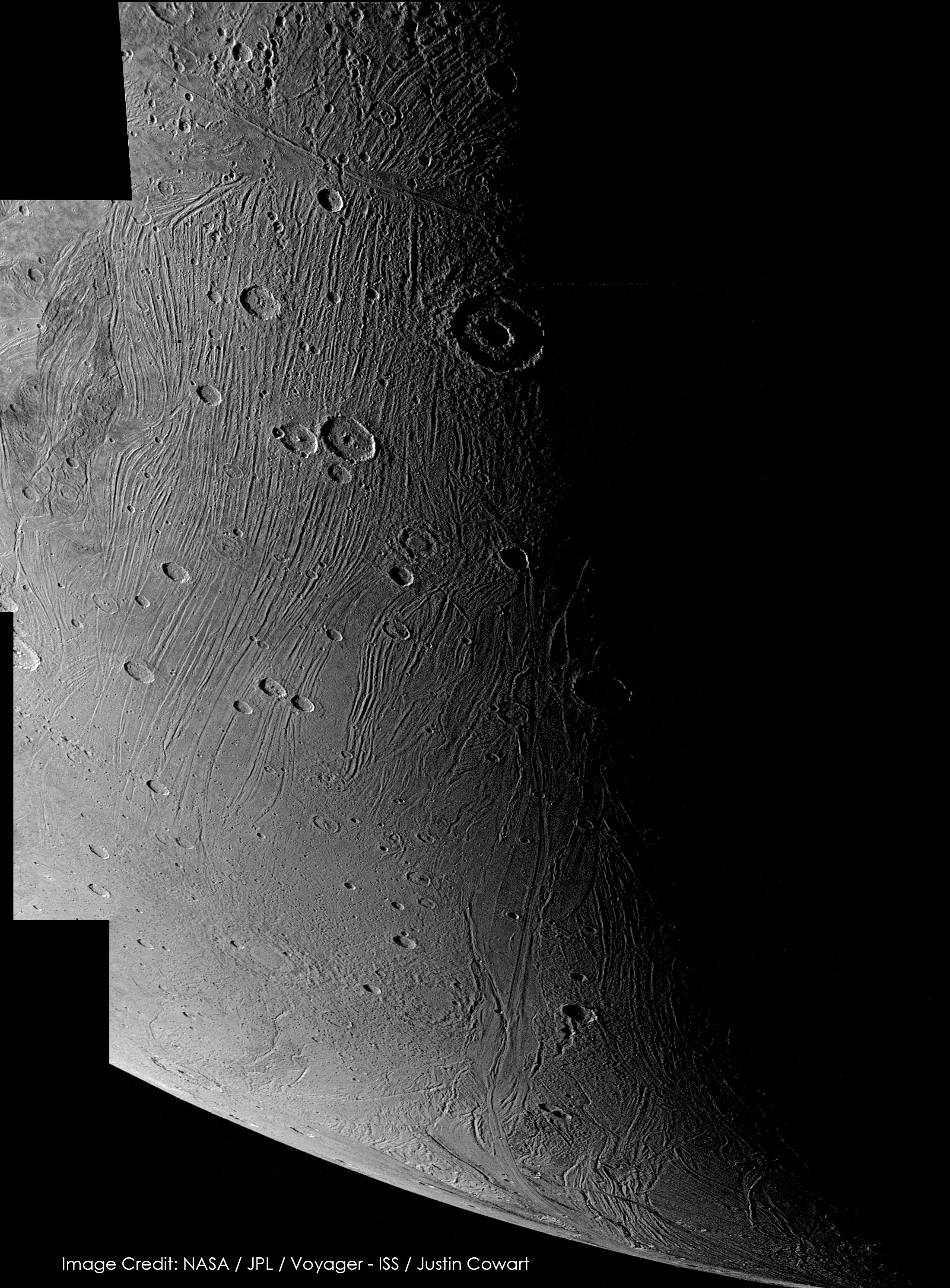
- A mosaic image of Bubastis Sulci, taken by the Voyager 2 space probe on July 9, 1979. The double-ring crater located slightly above the center of the image, straddling Ganymede's terminator, is Anubis.
- Feature type: Multiple Sulci
- Coordinates: 81.00°S 225.00°W
- Length: 2,730 kilometres (1,700 mi)
- Eponym: Bubastis

Bubastis Sulci is a sprawling, multi-sulci region that extends around the south pole of Jupiter's largest moon Ganymede. This surface feature runs for approximately 2,730 kilometres (1,700 mi) in some areas across the moon's surface.

== Naming ==
The International Astronomical Union (IAU) named Bubastis Sulci after the Ancient Egyptian town called Bubastis, a place that is famous for being the center of worship for Bastet, the great goddess of cats of the Ancient Egyptians. This is in line with the theme that features and craters on Ganymede should be named after deities, heroes, or places from Ancient Middle Eastern mythologies, which includes Egyptian mythology.

The IAU approved the name for Bubastis Sulci in 1988.

== Geography ==
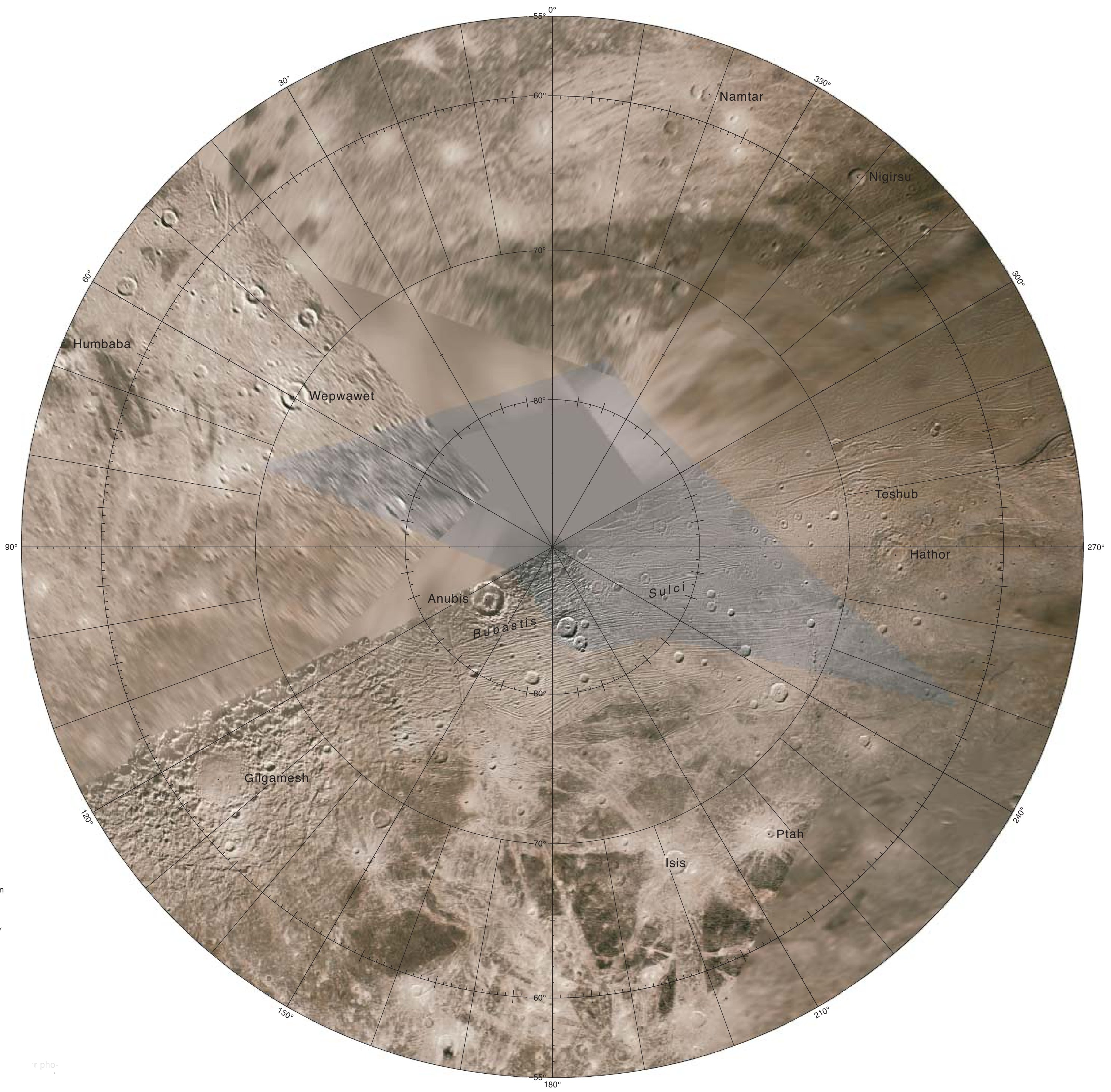
A map of the south pole area of Ganymede. Bubastis Sulci occupies much of the area around the south pole from 120° west to 60° east (i.e. 300°) longitude.

Bubastis Sulci is a massive feature that wraps around much of Ganymede's south pole.

Bubastis Sulci is home to several impact craters of varying types like Anubis, Hathor, and Teshub. To its north lies the surface depression called Hamra Patera, and three bright craters that are close to each other—Isis, Osiris, and Ptah. To the northwest are the craters Nut and, further north, Tashmetum. To the north east is the crater Gilgamesh, one of the largest known impact craters on Ganymede.

The sulci formation terminates near another sulcus, the Borsippa Sulcus, to the west. However, the endpoint of Bubastis Sulci to the east is unmarked by any geographical feature (abruptly ending at 120° west longitude).

Bubastis Sulci occupies much of Ganymede's Hathor quadrangle (designated Jg15), although its northwesternmost parts are crossing over into Namtar quadrangle (designated Jg14)

== Geology and Key Features ==
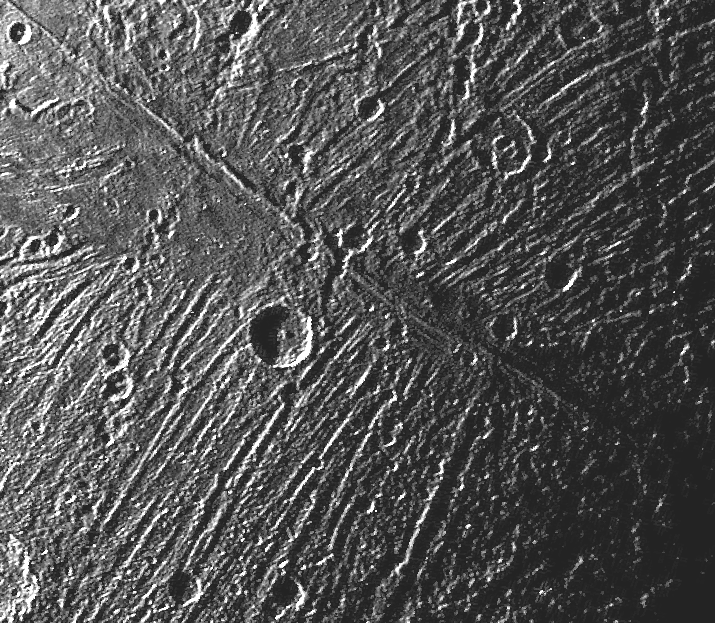
An image of a section of Bubastis Sulci that is close to Ganymede's south pole, showing a unique, linear ridge where other ridges seem to propagate. The crater in shadow in the lower right is Anubis, while the region in the upper left is Hamra Patera

Like many other bright regions on Ganymede, Bubastis Sulci is considered a typical example of bright, young terrain, characterized by multiple sets of ridges and grooves, smoother surfaces, and a lower crater density. Sulci like Bubastis mark the spots on Ganymede's surface where older, darker terrain had been erased and resurfaced with brighter, fresher materials (usually clean water ice) by endogenic tectonic forces. This process is common throughout Ganymede and has played a major role in shaping its appearance over the ages. Using stereographic imaging techniques, the space probe Voyager 2 was able to study the topography of Bubastis Sulci because it was where its best stereo imaging was concentrated, allowing scientists to search for evidence of extrusion associated with the bright terrain. Though its features are generally difficult to interpret, and no clear flow fronts have been identified within this region, an unusual exposure of bright terrain occurs at 77°S, 145°W of the moon, in the form of a linear ridge at least 500 km long, flanked by smooth material extending laterally up to 50 km. This ridge cuts across Bubastis Sulci and is the only structure observed to do so, making it a unique feature, as most smooth terrain elsewhere is structurally constrained by scarps or lineaments.

Topographically, the ridge and surrounding smooth deposits lie in a broad, shallow depression, and the ridge itself is discontinuous with substantial variations in height and width. Its northern end tapers gradually into smooth deposits, and sections of the ridge double, suggesting that underlying structural features guided its formation. Additional parallel, discontinuous ridges within the smooth terrain appear to be partially flooded remnants of ridge-and-trough formations. These observations support the interpretation that the smooth deposits originated from the extrusion of a fluid-like material. The deposits follow the topography closely and embay the grooves of Bubastis Sulci, similar to how lunar maria embay craters, indicating that the smooth deposits are younger than the grooved terrain.

== Exploration ==
Bubastis Sulci is located around the south pole of Ganymede, which makes it difficult to see using space probes that are only doing a flyby along the ecliptic plane of the Solar System. This is due to the fact that Jupiter's rotational axis and Ganymede's orbit are tilt by only around 3.1° with respect to Jupiter's orbital plane around the Sun, which means that any visiting spacecraft would need to deviate from the ecliptic plane and travel towards the south of Ganymede to see Bubastis Sulci clearly.

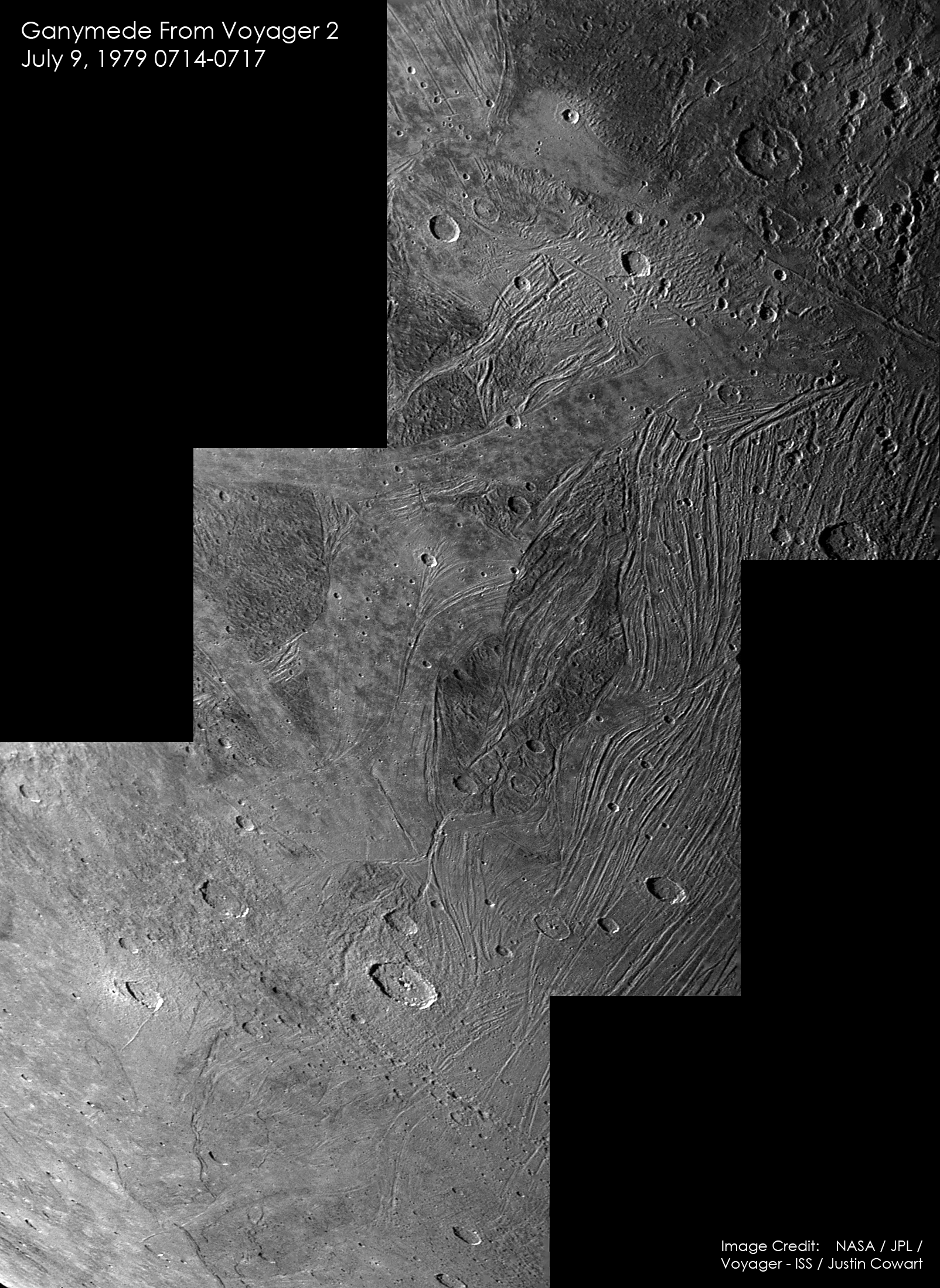
Another mosaic image of Bubastis Sulci, taken by Voyager 2 in July 1979. The region in the upper right of the image is Hamra Patera

Voyager 2 only did a quick flyby of Jupiter and Ganymede in July 1979, but it managed to send back the first clear images of Bubastis Sulci, but only at low angles, thanks to its slightly southward trajectory on its approach to the Jovian system. Its stereographic images of Bubastis Sulci were used by scientists to understand the nature of Ganymede's tectonic activity and the moon's history.

Galileo became the next and last spacecraft up to date to see Bubastis Sulci.

== See also ==
Sulcus (geology)
