= Gilgamesh (crater) =

Multi-ring impact basin on Ganymede

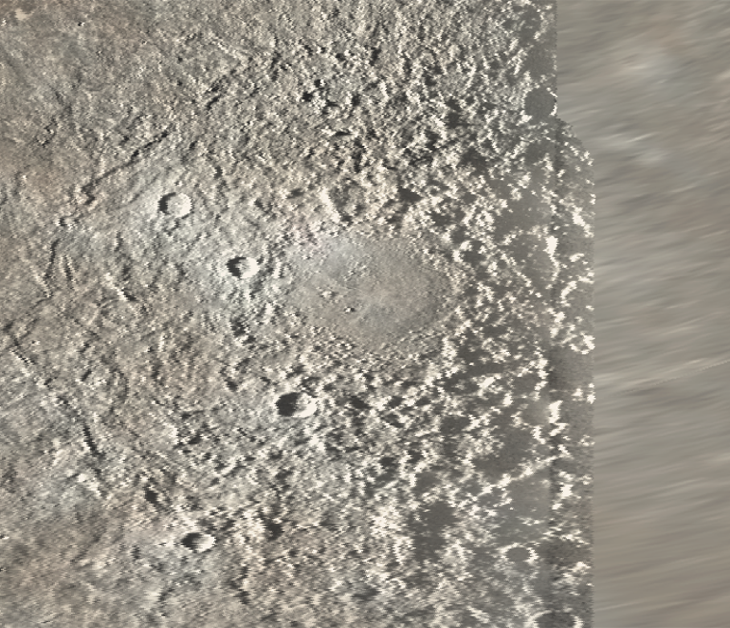
- An image of Gilgamesh, taken by Voyager 2 on 9 July 1979.
- Feature type: Multi-ring impact basin
- Location: Ganymede
- Coordinates: 62.84°S 124.83°W
- Diameter: c. 590 km (370 mi)
- Depth: c. 2 km (1.2 mi)
- Impactor diameter: c. 60 km
- Age: c. 3.35 billion years
- Eponym: Gilgamesh, Mesopotamian hero

Gilgamesh is a large multi-ring impact basin on Jupiter's largest moon Ganymede. The impact structure was observed in detail by the Voyager 2 and Galileo missions, enabling its characteristics to be studied in detail. With an estimated diameter of around 590 kilometres (370 mi), it is one of the largest known impact basins on Ganymede.

== Naming ==
Named after Gilgamesh, a hero in ancient Mesopotamian mythology, and the protagonist of the Epic of Gilgamesh, the crater's name follows the International Astronomical Union (IAU) convention of naming Ganymede's craters after deities, heroes, or places from Ancient Near Eastern mythologies, including Mesopotamian mythology. The name was approved by the IAU in 1979 Gilgamesh is best known for his quest to attain immortality. After encountering and battling several creatures and gods, Gilgamesh ultimately failed to attain immortality. His eventual failure is often interpreted as a lesson that humans can never achieve immortality, no matter what they do. Gilgamesh was also the king of the ancient city of Uruk.

The name was adopted by the IAU in 1979.

== Location ==
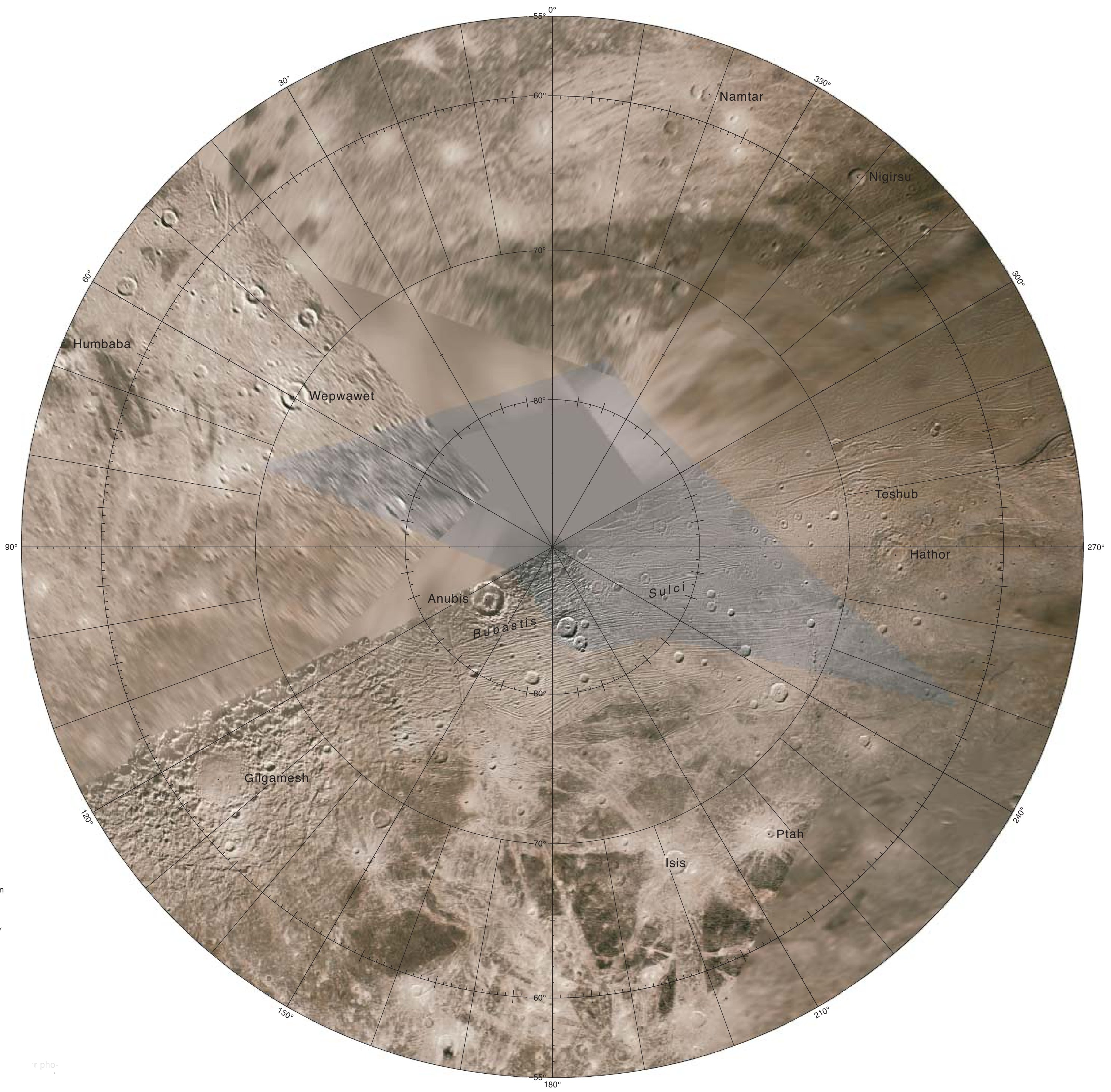
A map of the south polar region of Ganymede, showing the location of Gilgamesh crater.

Gilgamesh is located in the southern hemisphere of Ganymede, between the moon's mid-latitudes and polar region. The crater's multi-ring structure dominates most of its surroundings. To the northwest is the bright ray crater Andjeti and a potential ground level cryovolcano called Yaroun Patera. To the south is the double ringed crater Anubis and the sprawling, bright grooved terrain called Bubastis Sulci.

Gilgamesh straddles the boundary between the Osiris quadrangle (designated Jg12) and the Hathor quadrangle (designated Jg15).

Gilgamesh is located on the hemisphere of Ganymede that permanently faces away from Jupiter. Due to the moon's synchronous rotation as it orbit around its parent planet, one hemisphere of Ganymede always points Jupiter while the opposite hemisphere always faces away. Therefore, an observer at Gilgamesh would never see Jupiter in the sky. (Note: For moons in synchronous rotation, such as Ganymede, 0° longitude corresponds to the part of the surface that always faces Jupiter. Regions between 90° W and 270° W longitude never face the moon’s parent planet.)

== Characteristics ==
Gilgamesh is approximately 590 kilometres (370 mi) in diameter, making it the largest fully preserved impact structure on Ganymede. It is a multi-ring impact basin, with at least 4 concentric rings surrounding a smooth central plain 150 kilometres (93 mi) across. The central plain domes upward by up to 500 metres (1,600 ft), and several small hills are arranged in a 50 kilometres (31 mi) diameter arc surrounding the center. Surrounding the central plain is a discontinuous inward-facing scarp averaging 1 kilometre (0.62 mi) high, marking the inner boundary of a 225-kilometre-wide (140 mi) annular region of hummocky terrain hosting discontinuous concentric ridges and angular mountains. Another prominent inward-facing scarp marks the outer boundary, averaging 1 km in height and about 585 kilometres (364 mi) in diameter. Some segments of this scarp are quasi-linear, suggesting that pre-existing terrain may have influenced its shape. The location and prominence of the outer scarp suggests it is likely Gilgamesh's rim. The angular mountains are 20–40 kilometres (12–25 mi) long, and their long axes point radially toward the basin center. Structurally, Gilgamesh resembles Argyre Planitia on Mars, which also exhibits numerous discontinuous concentric ridges.

Gilgamesh is surrounded by a 200-kilometre-wide (120 mi) ring of mottled terrain where the pre-existing grooved terrain has been covered or obliterated by its ejecta blanket. A vast field of secondary craters and crater chains extends up to 400–1,000 kilometres (250–620 mi) from the basin. Most of the secondary craters and crater chains are concentrated to the north and south of the basin; no secondary craters are identifiable to Gilgamesh's west, suggesting that it was formed by an oblique impact. Many of the secondary craters are larger than a few kilometers in size and are thus complex craters A 2018 study led by planetary scientist Kelsi Singer calculated the theoretical size of fragments blasted out by Gilgamesh's formative impact event, yielding a maximum fragment size of 360 metres (1,180 ft). This maximum fragment size implies that secondary craters formed by Gilgamesh's impact event are no larger than 2–3 kilometres (1.2–1.9 mi) in diameter.

== Age ==
Gilgamesh, by the law of superposition, is younger than the surrounding grooved terrain since no grooves cut into its structure. In combination with the crater counting method on younger craters superposed on the basin rim, Gilgamesh's constrained age likely lies between 3.5 and 3.2 billion years (Gyr). The projectile that formed Gilgamesh is estimated to have been around 60 kilometres (37 mi) in size. Gilgamesh is structurally distinct from large impact basins on Callisto such as Valhalla, which have organized incomplete concentric rings and moderate topographical relief. Gilgamesh's closer resemblance to large impact basins on Earth's Moon indicates that at the time of its formation, Ganymede's crust was thicker and more rigid than Callisto's at the time of Valhalla's formation. The preservation of Gilgamesh's structure post-formation may be partially due to its location in Ganymede's polar regions where the crust cooled more rapidly, preventing viscous relaxation.

The United States Geological Survey (USGS) divides Ganymede's geologic history into three periods: the Nicholsonian, Harpagian, and Gilgameshan. During the Nicholsonian Period, Ganymede's original crust darkened because of contamination by dark, non-ice material from space. During the Harpagian Period, tectonic activity resurfaced and erased about two-thirds of Ganymede's ancient dark terrain. Most of the bright, grooved terrain that are found across Ganymede formed during this resurfacing event.

The Gilgameshan Period is the youngest major geologic period on Ganymede and is defined by the formation of the Gilgamesh impact basin. The formation of the basin is so significant that it marks the start of a new geologic period on Ganymede, much like Earth's geologic periods are defined by major events. Geological activity during this period was dominated by impact cratering, with no evidence of major tectonic resurfacing. Early in the period, a small number of palimpsests and heavily degraded craters formed, while later impacts produced progressively better-preserved craters with more prominent topographic relief. This transition has been interpreted as evidence that Ganymede's internal heat flow decreased substantially during the Gilgameshan Period, causing the moon's cold, rigid outer ice shell to thicken and better preserve impact crater morphology.

== Observation and exploration ==
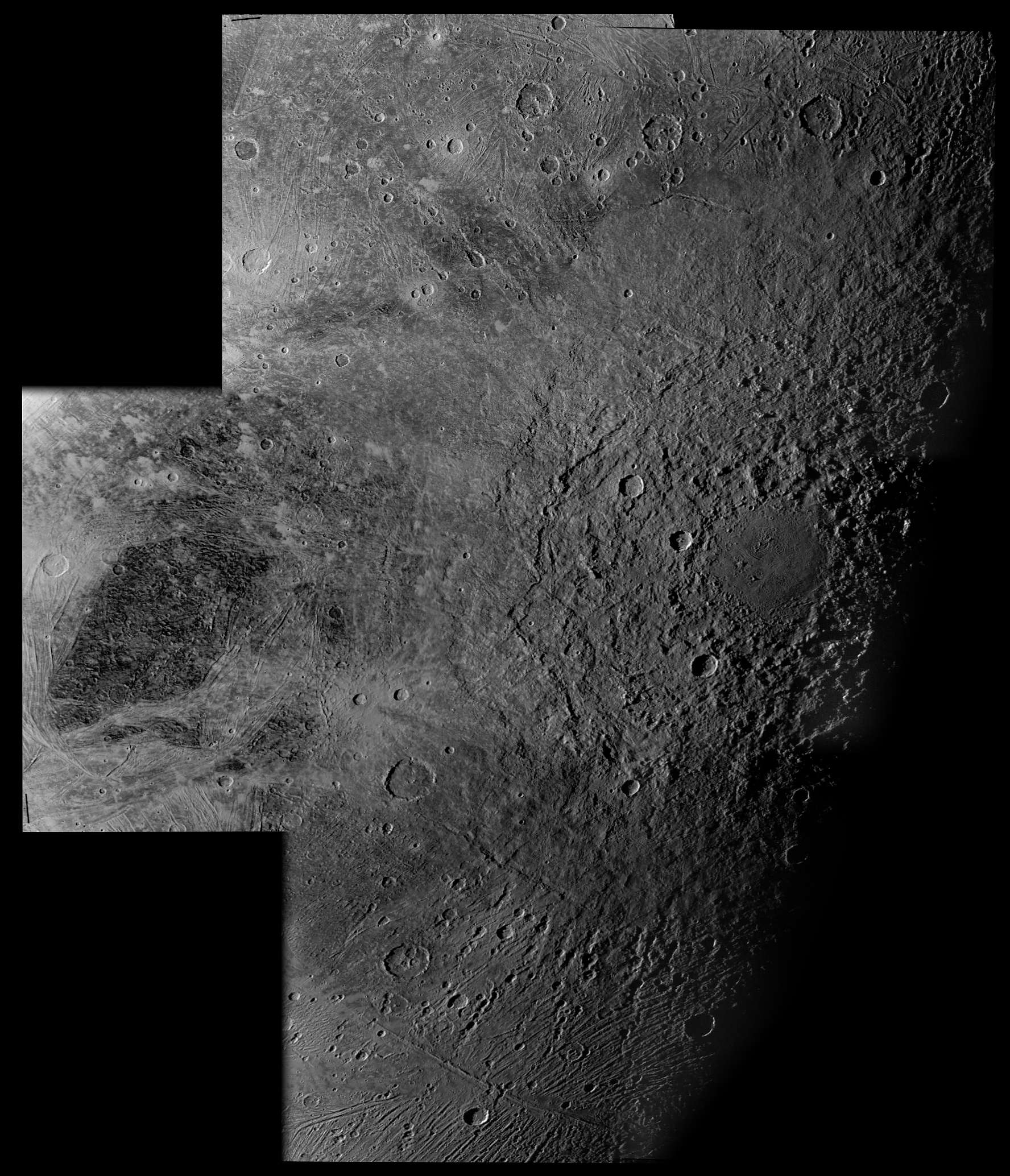
A mosaic of Gilgamesh constructed from images taken by Voyager 2 in July 1979.

Voyager 2 became the first space probe to view and photograph Gilgamesh crater during its flyby of Ganymede in July 1979. Gilgamesh's location near Ganymede's south pole and its distance from the ecliptic plane make it difficult to observe. Voyager 2's slightly southward trajectory toward the next planet on its tour, Saturn, enabled the probe to image Ganymede's southern regions. During the flyby, the probe managed to image Gilgamesh crater at a resolution of 550 m (1,800 ft) per pixel.

Voyager 1, on the other hand, was unable to image Gilgamesh because the crater was on Ganymede's night side during the flyby.

Galileo became the next, and to date, the most recent, spacecraft to image Gilgamesh crater during its E12 orbit. The probe obtained images of the crater at a resolution as high as 160 m (520 ft) per pixel. However, Gilgamesh was near local noon during Galileo's flyby, causing the terrain to appear washed out because of the lack of shadows.

=== Future Missions ===
The European Space Agency's (ESA) Jupiter Icy Moons Explorer (Juice) is currently on its way to Jupiter and its moons. It is scheduled to arrive at Jupiter in July 2031. After spending around three and a half years orbiting Jupiter while performing multiple flybys of Europa, Callisto and Ganymede, Juice will settle into a low polar orbit around Ganymede at a distance of just 500 kilometres (310 mi). Juice is expected to provide images of Gilgamesh at an even higher resolution than Galileo.

== See also ==
- Burney – a multi-ring impact basin on Pluto
- Caloris Planitia – a similarly-structured impact basin on Mercury
- Mare Orientale – a well-preserved multi-ring impact basin on the Moon
