= Latpon (crater) =

Crater on Ganymede

- An incomplete mosaic image of Latpon crater, taken by the Galileo space probe on 6 September 1996 during its G2 orbit around Jupiter.
- Feature type: Crater
- Coordinates: 58.74°N 171.21°W
- Diameter: 43 kilometres (27 mi)
- Eponym: Latpon

Latpon is an intermediate-sized crater located in the mid-latitudes of the moon Ganymede. The crater is about 43 kilometres (27 mi) wide.

== Naming ==
According to the official databases of the International Astronomical Union (IAU), the organization responsible for officially naming celestial bodies and surface features on them, and the United States Geological Service (USGS), the crater is named after Latpon, who is allegedly one of the many sons of the progenitor god El in Canaanite mythology. However, information about Latpon and references to him are scant.

The crater's name follows the International Astronomical Union's (IAU) convention of naming craters on Ganymede after deities, heroes, and places from Ancient Near Eastern mythologies. The IAU approved the name for Latpon in 1997 since this figure originated from Canaanite mythology.

== Geography and location ==
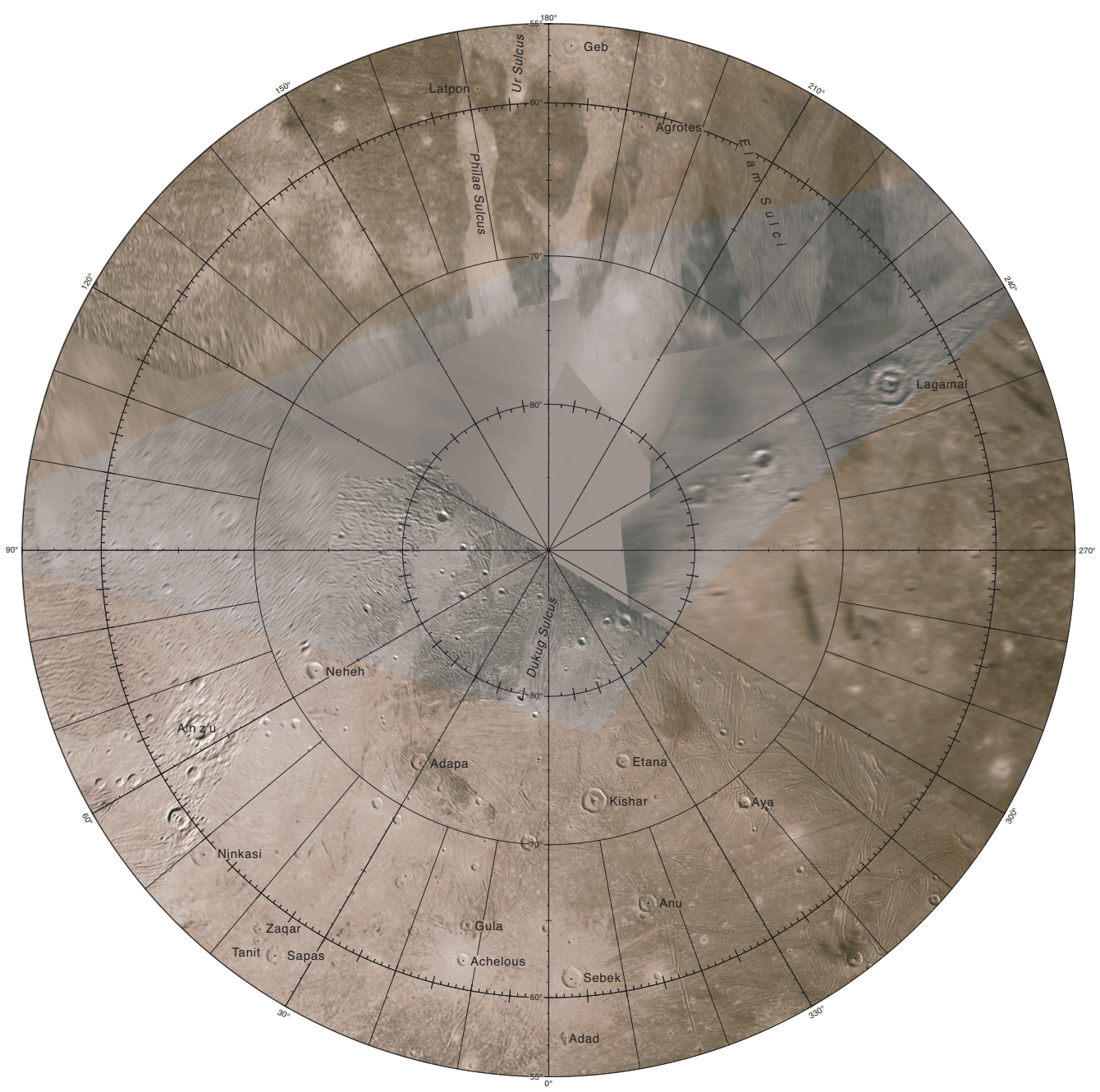
Latpon crater is located near the boundary of the arctic region of Ganymede. The crater can be seen in the upper part of the map.

Latpon is located at the boundary between an unnamed dark region on Ganymede and two brighter, grooved terrains called Philae Sulcus and Ur Sulcus.

Philae Sulcus and the massive dark region on Ganymede called Galileo Regio lie to Latpon's east, while the other grooved terrain Ur Sulcus lies to the south.

Latpon is located within the Galileo Regio quadrangle (or section) of Ganymede (designated Jg3), near the boundary with the Philus Sulcus quadrangle.

Since Ganymede is in synchronous rotation with respect to Jupiter, meaning that one hemisphere of the moon always faces its parent planet while the opposite hemisphere never does, Latpon crater is located on the hemisphere that never faces Jupiter. Therefore, an observer at the crater would never see Jupiter in the sky. (Note: For moons in synchronous rotation, such as Ganymede, 0° longitude corresponds to the part of the surface that always faces Jupiter. Regions between 90° W and 270° W longitude never face the moon's parent planet.)

== Morphology ==
Latpon is a well-defined crater located within a dark region in Ganymede's northern mid-latitudes. Dark regions on the moon are considered to be the most ancient parts of its surface, as they have not been significantly altered by the tectonic activity that created the younger, bright grooved terrains. Latpon is surrounded by brighter grooved terrains but has managed to retain the integrity of its structure. This suggests that Latpon escaped being significantly damaged from the geological activity that created the nearby Philae Sulcus and Ur Sulcus in Ganymede's past.

Because the center of the crater has not yet been adequately imaged, it is unclear whether Latpon possesses a central peak, a central dome, or a central pit, as found in many other craters on Ganymede.

Like most of Ganymede's mid-latitude and polar surface regions, Latpon is covered by a layer of frost that is considerably more bluish and less reddish than the rest of the moon's surface. However, this layer of frost is not thick enough to obscure any major surface features on Ganymede.

== Exploration ==
Latpon was photographed in detail by only one spacecraft, the Galileo probe, which flew past Latpon during its G2 orbit in September 1996. It was able to fly very close to the crater, allowing the probe to resolve details as small as 45 metres (148 ft) per pixel. Unfortunately, this extremely close encounter also narrowed Galileo's field of view, so only the eastern part of the crater was imaged properly.

=== Future missions ===
The European Space Agency's (ESA) Jupiter Icy Moons Explorer (Juice) orbiter is scheduled to arrive at Jupiter in July 2031. Following its arrival, Juice will spend approximately three and a half years orbiting Jupiter and conducting multiple flybys of Europa, Callisto, and Ganymede before entering a low polar orbit around Ganymede in late 2034. During its Ganymede mission, Juice will have several opportunities to revisit Latpon and obtain additional images of the crater, potentially filling in the portions that were not adequately imaged by Galileo.

== See also ==
- List of craters on Ganymede
- Meteor
