= Isis (Ganymede crater) =

Crater on Ganymede

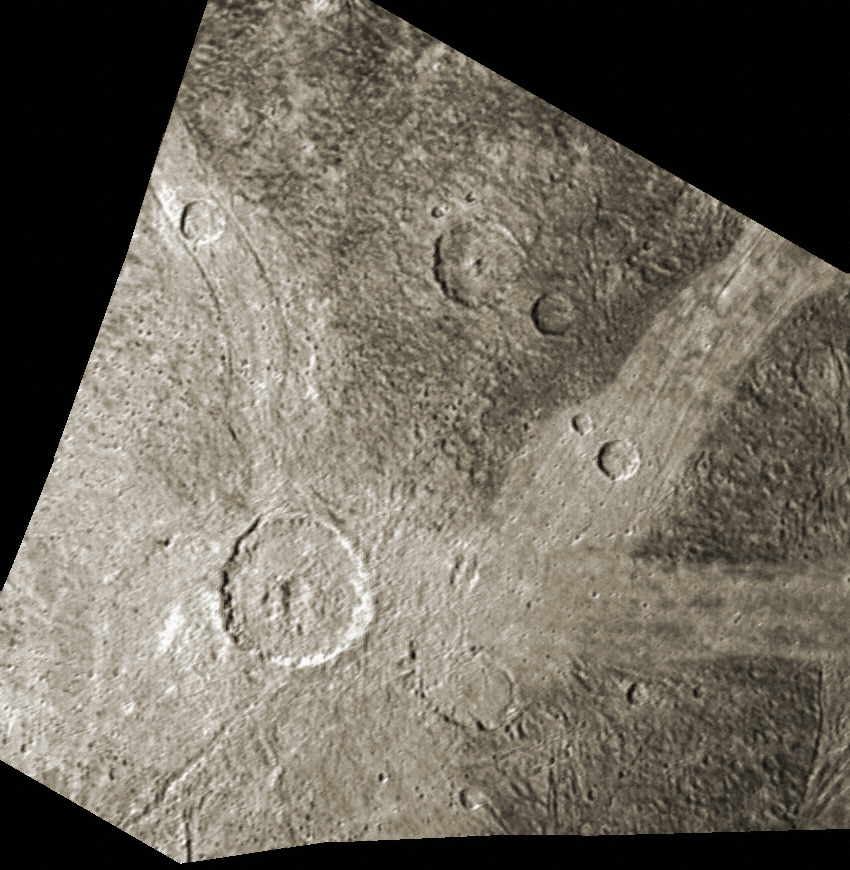
- A mosaic image of Isis, taken by Voyager 2 on July 9 1979 using stereo imaging.
- Feature type: Pit crater
- Coordinates: 67.28°S 201.20°W
- Diameter: 75 kilometres (47 mi)
- Eponym: Isis

Isis is a major crater on Ganymede, the largest moon of Jupiter. It is a bright pit crater that is located slightly more than two-thirds of the distance from the equator of the moon to its south pole.

== Naming ==
Isis is named after the Egyptian goddess Isis, who became the mother goddess of Egypt and its most powerful goddess. She was the goddess of magic, healing, protection, fertility, motherhood and childbirth, serving several functions in Egyptian mythology. Isis was the wife of Osiris whom she pieced together after he was killed and dismembered by Set. Together, Isis and Osiris had a son named Horus, who famously avenged the murder of his father.

According to the International Astronomical Union (IAU), craters and geological features on Ganymede should be named after deities, heroes, and places from Ancient Near Eastern mythologies. Egyptian mythology falls under this category. Nearby craters such Osiris and Anubis follow the same Egyptian naming theme. The crater's name was approved by the IAU in 1979.

== Location ==
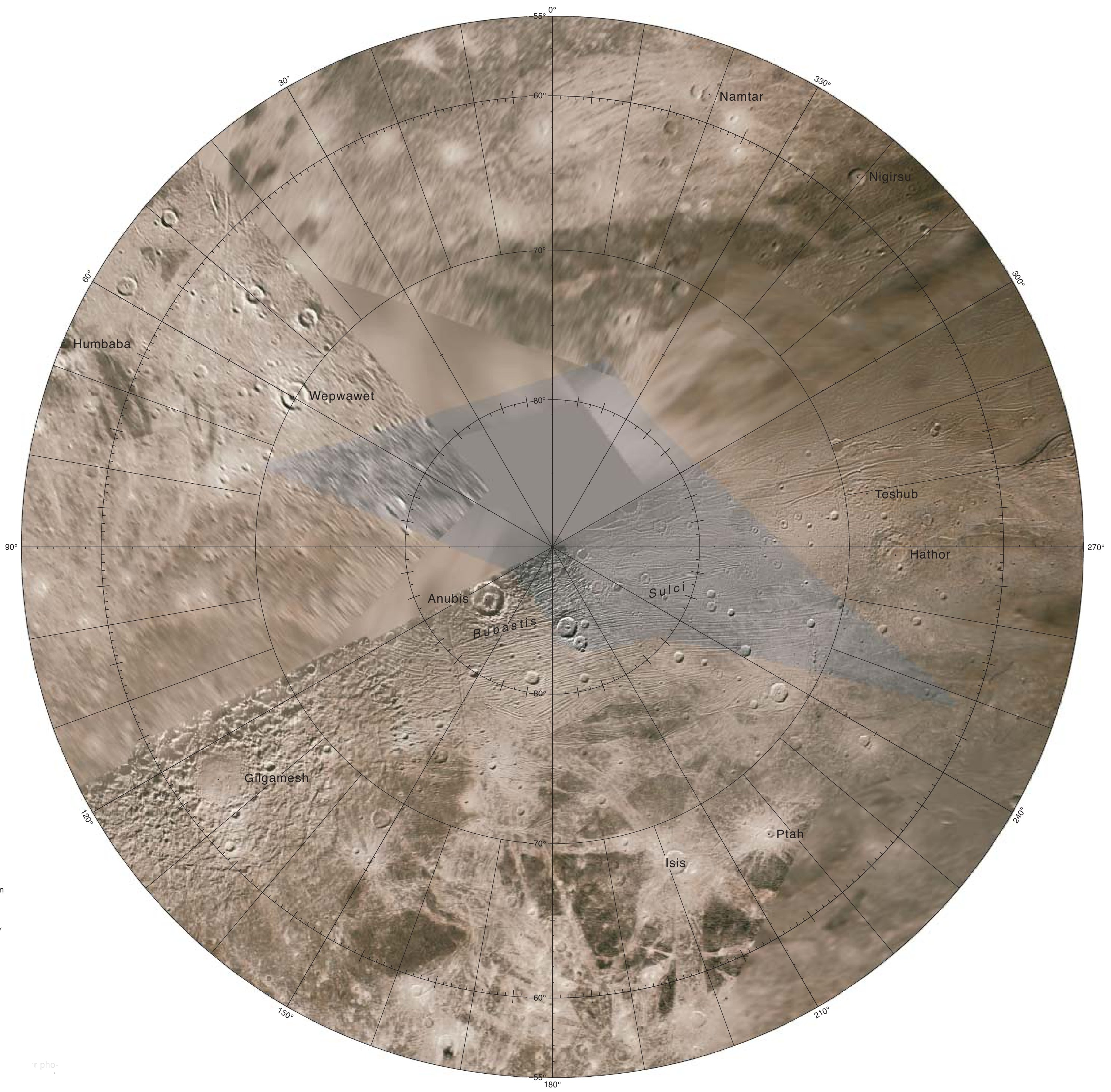
A map of the south polar region of Ganymede, showing the Hathor quadrangle and the location of Isis at the bottom part of the map.

To Isis's west lies a bright ray crater named Ptah. Dozens of other craters surround Isis and they often overlap with the sulci associated with Isis. However, they are all unnamed. To Isis's south, the sprawling, grooved-terrain Bubastis Sulci covers the rest of the surface between the crater and Ganymede's south pole.

Isis is located within the Hathor quadrangle (designated Jg15) of Ganymede, but its northern rays are crossing over into the Apsu Sulci quadrangle. (designated Jg13) The side of Ganymede where Isis is located never faces Jupiter as a consequence of the moon's synchronous rotation. This means that an observer on Isis will never see Jupiter. (Note: For moons in synchronous rotation, such as Ganymede, 0° longitude corresponds to the part of the surface that always faces Jupiter. Regions between 90° W and 270° W longitude never face the moon's parent planet.)

== Morphology ==
Isis is a bright crater with a pit in the middle. It is roughly 75 kilometres (47 mi) wide, and at least 2 kilometres (1.2 mi) deep in some areas relative to the mean surface level of Ganymede.

Unlike most craters on rocky planets and the Moon, Isis and many Ganymedean craters have a central pit instead of a central peak. Currently, the reason why this is the case is poorly understood, but it suggests that Ganymede’s surface and subsurface differ significantly in nature from those of rocky worlds. According to more recent studies, these central pits formed when meltwater generated by heat from the asteroid impact is created under the floor of the crater. As the meltwater refroze, it expanded—since water expands when it freezes—damaging the crater floor and causing a pit to form like a sinkhole, particularly at its center. Such pit craters are expected to continue evolving if meltwater still remains beneath the crater’s surface, where additional freezing and expansion of liquid water can transform the pit into a dome (similar to Osiris crater nearby).

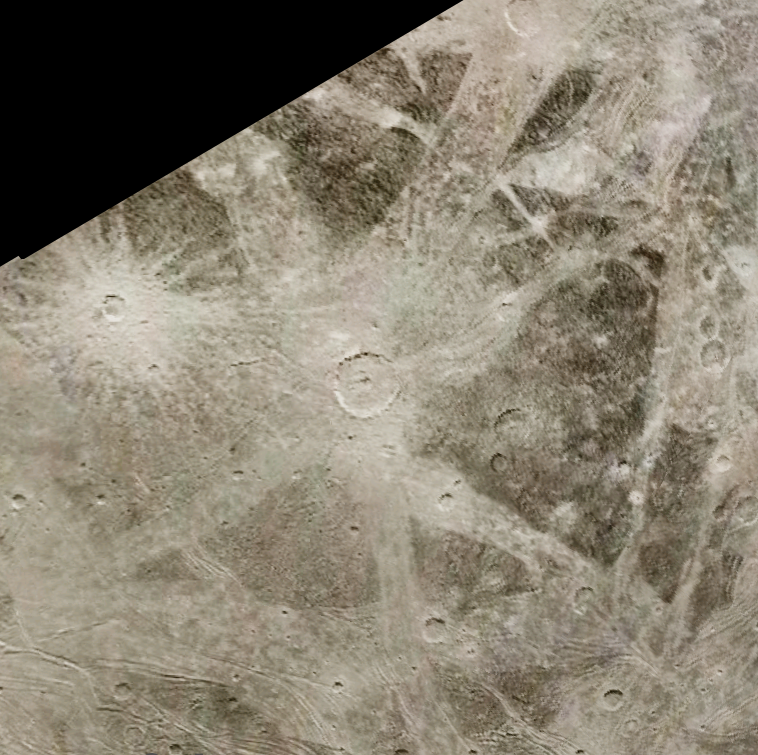
A mosaic image of Isis and its surrounding areas. The ray crater on the left is Ptah

Six bright sulci radiate outward from Isis, forming what looks like crater rays, although it is not yet fully confirmed if these sulci are actually rays that were formed when Isis was created. It is noticeable that unlike the rays of other similar craters, Isis' rays do not propagate in a symmetrical or radial manner. Instead, the rays emanate from the crater and then they bend or curve in another direction after a few hundreds of kilometers. Together, their shape resembles the legs of a crab or a spider.

== Geology ==
The asteroid or comet that created Isis appears to have crashed into a dark region of Ganymede's surface (called a regio). The dark regions of the moon's surface are considered as some of the most ancient parts of Ganymede. The bright, newer materials (mostly clean water ice) that were excavated and ejected from beneath the moon's surface by the more recent impactor seem to have coated a huge portion of the older, dark region, partly erasing it as seen today. Fresh ice reflects a lot of sunlight which creates a sharp contrast between the younger rays and the darker, older regio.

== Exploration ==
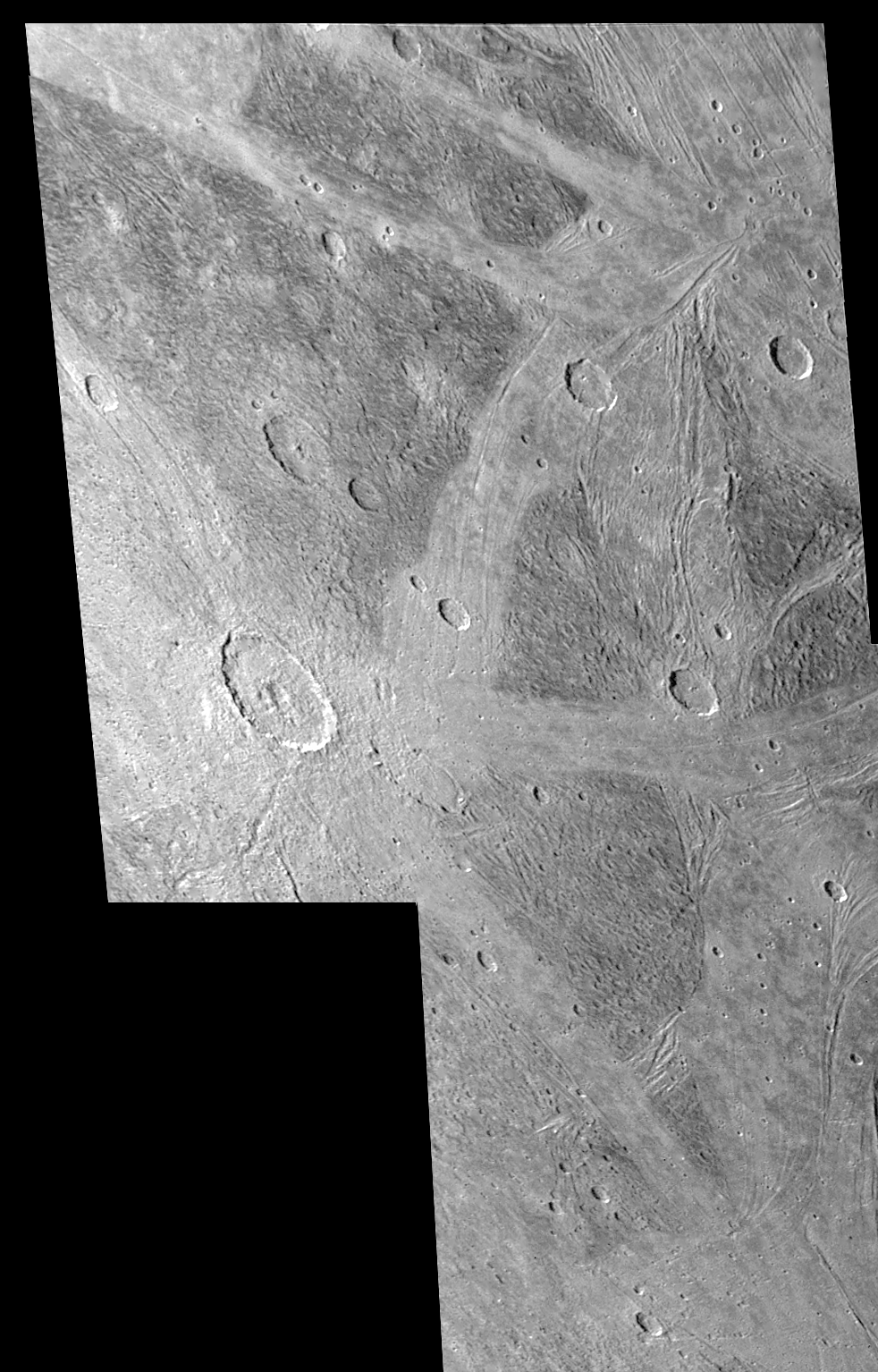
A mosaic image of Isis, taken by Voyager 2 in July 1979

Voyager 2 was the first spacecraft to send back images of Isis when it flew by Jupiter in July 1979. Voyager 1 was unable to photograph Isis when it flew by Jupiter in March 1979 because the crater was in darkness, and was on the opposite side of Ganymede as the probe departed the Jovian system.

Galileo became the next probe to study Ganymede when it orbited Jupiter from December 1995 to September 2003. It was able to fly above Isis several times.

=== Future exploration ===
The European Space Agency's (ESA) Jupiter Icy Moons Explorer (Juice) will arrive at Jupiter in July 2031. After spending around three and a half years orbiting Jupiter while performing multiple flybys of Europa, Callisto and Ganymede, Juice will settle into a low polar orbit around Ganymede at a distance of just 500 kilometres (310 mi). Juice is expected to be able to provide clearer images of Isis.

== See also ==
- List of craters on Ganymede
- Meteor
