= Anubis (crater) =

Crater on Ganymede

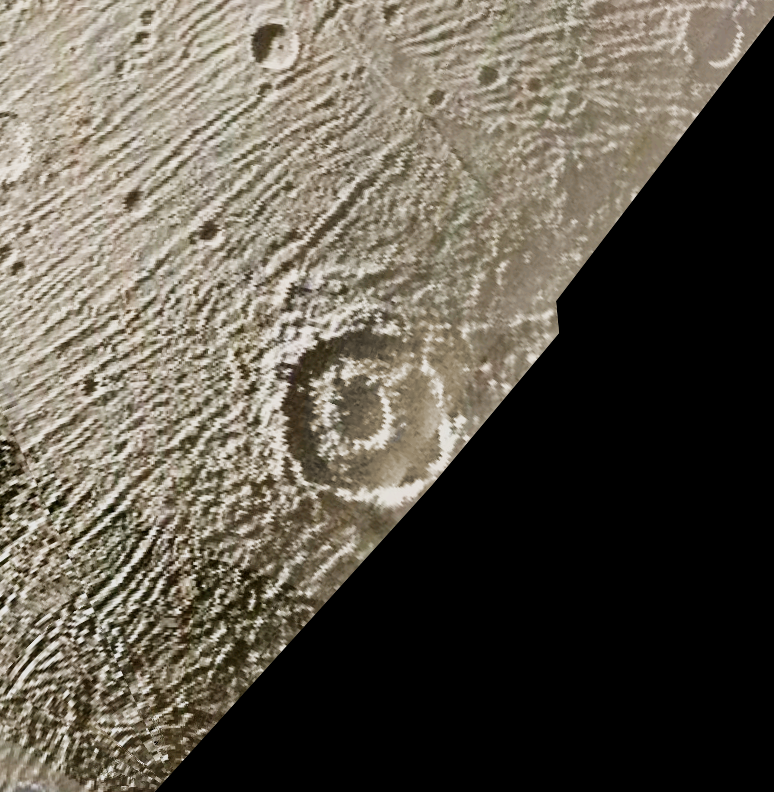
- An image of Anubis crater, taken by Voyager 2 on 9 July 1979.
- Feature type: Concentric Crater with Central Dome
- Coordinates: 84.44°S 128.66°W
- Diameter: 114 kilometres (71 mi)
- Eponym: Anubis

Anubis is a crater near the south pole of Jupiter's largest moon Ganymede. It is a concentric crater with at least two crater rims, with the smaller rim being completely inside the bigger one. The crater has a small dome at its center. The crater's inner rim is approximately 43 kilometres (27 mi) wide, while its outer rim is approximately 114 kilometres (71 mi) wide.

== Naming ==
Anubis is named after the Egyptian god Anubis, the jackal-headed god of the dead, mummification and funerals. The name was approved by the International Astronomical Union (IAU) in 1988.

The crater's name follows the IAU's convention of naming geological features and craters on Ganymede after deities, heroes and places from Ancient Middle Eastern mythologies—which includes Egyptian mythology. Many nearby surface features such as Isis and Osiris all share the same Egyptian mythology theme.

== Geography ==
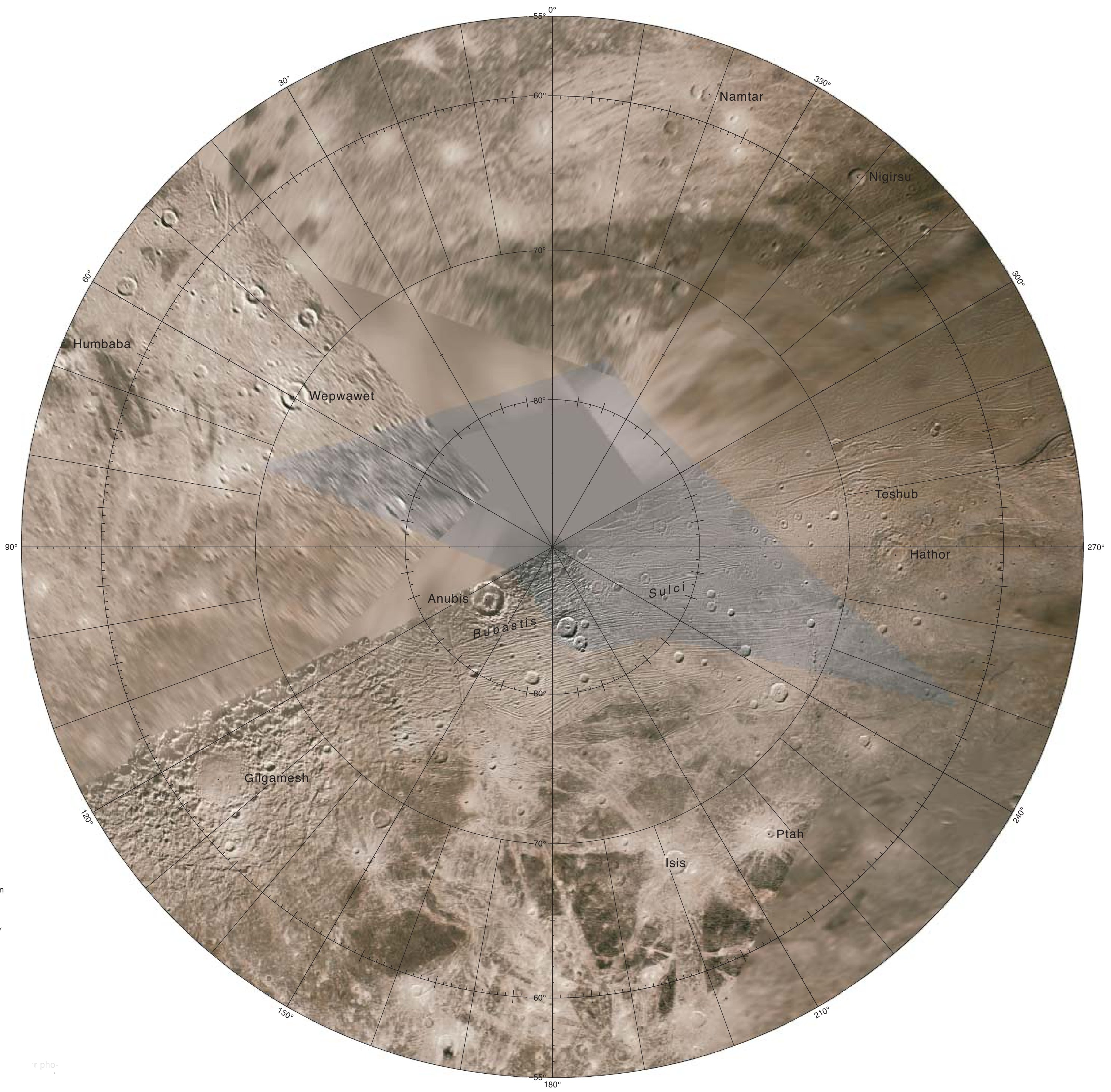
A map of the south polar region of Ganymede. Anubis crater is near the center where the south pole is.

Anubis is located within a grooved region called Bubastis Sulci. The crater is within the Hathor quadrangle (designated Jg15) of Ganymede which encompasses the entire region around the moon's south pole.

Oftentimes, sunlight cannot reach the deepest regions of the crater (like its center), and these areas are plunged in constant darkness for long periods of time because of the low tilt of Ganymede's axis and orbit relative to the Sun.

== Exploration ==
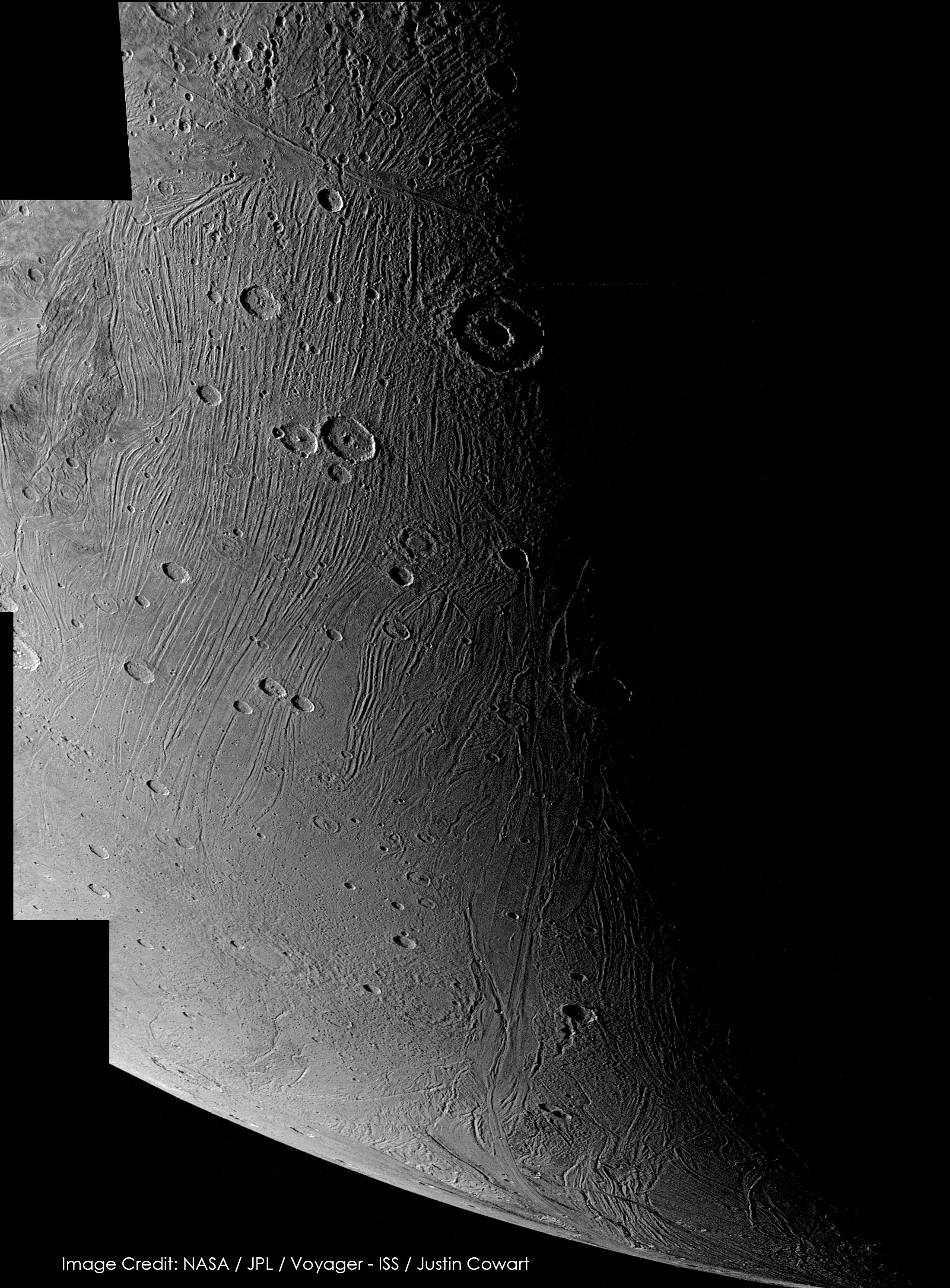
A mosaic image of Anubis (above the center) straddling the terminator of Ganymede, taken by Voyager 2 in July 1979.

Anubis is located close to Ganymede's south pole, which makes it relatively difficult to observe when using probes that are only performing a flyby along Jupiter's equator and the ecliptic plane. The low axial tilt of Jupiter (3.1°) and, consequently, the similarly low tilt of Ganymede’s axis and orbit, which are closely aligned with its parent planet’s equator—prevents spacecraft that are traveling along the ecliptic plane from obtaining clear views of Anubis.

Voyager 2 became the first spacecraft to explore Anubis in July 1979. The probe's slightly southward approach towards Jupiter allowed it to view the crater and the surrounding area of Bubastis Sulci. However, Anubis's position near the south pole means most of it was always in darkness.

As of 2025, there are no high-resolution images of Anubis.

=== Future missions ===
Because of the difficulties caused by Anubis’s position near the south pole, orbiter spacecraft are the most effective means to study study the crater.

The European Space Agency's (ESA) Jupiter Icy Moons Explorer (Juice) orbiter is scheduled to arrive at Jupiter in July 2031. After spending around three and a half years in orbit around Jupiter and performing multiple flybys of Europa, Callisto and Ganymede, Juice will settle into a low polar orbit around Ganymede, allowing the probe to get better images of Anubis as it periodically passes over Ganymede's south pole.

== See also ==
- Ta-urt - another crater on Ganymede that also has a double rim
- List of craters on Ganymede
- Permanently shadowed crater
- Meteor
