= List of craters on Ganymede =

Ganymede is the largest moon in the Solar System, and has a hard surface with many craters. Most of them are named after figures from Egyptian, Mesopotamian, Phoenician (or Canaanite), and other ancient Middle Eastern myths. Others are named after relatives of the mythological Trojan prince Ganymede from Greek mythology.

== List ==
Crater	Coordinates	Diameter (km)	Approval Year	Eponym	Ref
Achelous	61.9°N 11.78°W	40	1979	Achelous, Greek river god; father of Callirrhoe, Ganymede's mother.	WGPSN
Adad	57.43°N 1.98°E	39	1979	Adad, Assyro-Babylonian god of thunder.	WGPSN
Adapa	73.08°N 31.32°W	57	1979	Adapa, Assyro-Babylonian; lost immortality when, at Ea's advice, he refused food of life.	WGPSN
Agreus	15.87°N 127.3°E	63	1985	Agreus, Hunter god in Tyre.	WGPSN
Agrotes	60.93°N 167.38°E	74	1985	Agrotes, Tyre; greatest god of Gebal; farmer god.	WGPSN
Aleyin	15.14°N 134.08°W	12.4	1997	Aleyin, Son of Baʽal, spirit of springs.	WGPSN
Ammura	31.76°N 17.65°E	61.5	1979	Ammura, Phoenician; god of the west.	WGPSN
Amon	33.69°N 139.39°E	102	1985	Amon, Theban king of gods.	WGPSN
Amset	14.41°S 178.75°W	11	1997	Amset, One of the four gods of the dead, son of Horus.	WGPSN
Anat	4.1°S 128°W	2.9	1985	Anat, Assyro-Babylonian goddess of dew. Note: Defines 128 degrees longitude on Ganymede.	WGPSN
Andjeti	52.75°S 161.1°W	52	1985	Andjeti, Egyptian; first god of Busirus.	WGPSN
Anhur	32.63°N 167.68°E	25	1997	Anhur, Egyptian warrior god.	WGPSN
Antum	5.09°N 141.06°E	14.75	1985	Antum, Babylonian; wife of Anu.	WGPSN
Anu	65.24°N 15.75°E	55	1979	Anu, Sumerian-Akkadian god of power, of heavens.	WGPSN
Anubis	84.44°S 128.66°W	114	1988	Anubis, Egyptian jackal-headed god who opened the underworld to the dead.	WGPSN
Anzu	63.51°N 62.73°W	210	2000	Anzu, Gigantic lion-headed bird-like figure, the Sumerian Thunderbird.	WGPSN
Apophis	8.12°S 83.84°E	57	2000	Apophis, Egyptian gigantic serpent symbolizing chaos or nonexistence.	WGPSN
Ashîma	39.05°S 122.98°W	84	1985	Ashîm, Semitic-Arab god of fate.	WGPSN
Asshur	54.16°N 26.52°E	25.5	1979	Asshur, Assyro-Babylonian warrior god.	WGPSN
Atra-hasis	22.54°N 105.89°E	133	2000	Atra-hasis, Exceedingly wise' hero of Akkadian myth, survived the great flood.	WGPSN
Aya	68.34°N 37.98°E	38	1979	Aya, Assyro-Babylonian; wife of Shamash.	WGPSN
Baʽal	24.92°N 30.03°E	43	1979	Baʽal, Phoenician; Canaanite god.	WGPSN
Bau	23.05°N 48.67°W	77	1988	Bau, Goddess who breathed into men the breath of life; daughter of Anu and patroness of Lagash.	WGPSN
Bes	25.48°S 179.04°E	63	1985	Bes, Egyptian god of marriage.	WGPSN
Chrysor	15.3°N 134.34°W	7	1997	Chrysor, Phoenician god; inventor of bait, fishing hooks and line, first to sail.	WGPSN
Cisti	31.6°S 64.23°W	70	1997	Cisti, Iranian healing god.	WGPSN
Damkina	30.17°S 4.88°W	190	2006	Damkina, Babylonian sky and health deity, queen of the gods, and mother of Marduk in some accounts.	WGPSN
Danel	4.33°S 21.3°W	56	1979	Danel, Phoenician; mythical hero versed in art of divination.	WGPSN
Dendera	1.12°S 104.54°E	82	2000	Dendera, Town where Hathor was chief goddess. (Name changed from Dendera Facula.)	WGPSN
Diment	23.14°N 8.23°E	40	1979	Diment, Egyptian goddess of the dwelling place of the dead.	WGPSN
Ea	17.72°N 148.73°W	20	1997	Ea, Assyro-Babylonian god of water, wisdom, and the earth.	WGPSN
El	1.01°N 151.36°W	55	1997	El, "Father of Men", existed before the birth of gods.	WGPSN
Enkidu	26.61°S 34.87°E	122	1982	Enkidu, Friend of Gilgamesh.	WGPSN
Enlil	55.36°N 47.9°E	34.6	1979	Enlil, Assyro-Babylonian; nature god of the air, hurricanes, and nature.	WGPSN
En-zu	11.59°N 168.4°W	5	1997	Enzu, Babylonian moon god.	WGPSN
Epigeus	22.96°N 179.35°E	343	1997	Epigeus, Phoenician god.	WGPSN
Erichthonius	15.32°S 175.26°W	31	1997	Erichthonius, Possible father of Ganymede.	WGPSN
Eshmun	17.45°S 167.88°E	98	1979	Eshmun, Phoenician; divinity of Sidon.	WGPSN
Etana	74.74°N 19.65°E	46	1979	Etana, Assyro-Babylonian; asked the eagle for an herb to give him an heir.	WGPSN
Gad	13.56°S 137.56°W	72	1985	Gad, Semitic god of fate or good fortune.	WGPSN
Geb	56.41°N 177.35°E	60	1985	Geb, Heliopolis Earth god.	WGPSN
Geinos	18.64°N 140.56°E	56	1985	Geinos, Tyre; god of brick making.	WGPSN
Gilgamesh	62.84°S 124.83°W	153	1979	Gilgamesh, Assyro-Babylonian; sought immortality after Enkidu died.	WGPSN
Gir	34.05°N 145.75°W	73	1985	Gir, Sumerian god of summer heat.	WGPSN
Gula	64.15°N 12.3°W	38	1979	Gula, Assyro-Babylonian; medicine goddess.	WGPSN
Gushkin	20.75°N 45.98°W	40.5	2016	Gushkin-Banda, Sumerian patron god of goldsmiths.	WGPSN
Halieus	34.45°N 167.14°W	90	1985	Halieus, Tyre; fisherman god.	WGPSN
Hapi	30.57°S 147.34°E	96	1988	Hapi, Egyptian god of the Nile.	WGPSN
Harakhtes	35.95°N 100.26°W	108	2000	Harakhtes, "Horus of the Two Horizons", form of Egyptian god Horus who represents the path of the sun.	WGPSN
Haroeris	28.53°N 63.18°E	70	2000	Haroeris, Egyptian sky god whose eyes are the sun and the moon, a form of Horus.	WGPSN
Hathor	66.9°S 91.26°E	173	1979	Hathor, Egyptian goddess of joy and love.	WGPSN
Hay-tau	14.44°N 133.13°W	27	1997	Hay-tau, Nega god, spirit of forest vegetation.	WGPSN
Hedetet	32.91°S 108.99°E	106	2000	Hedetet, Egyptian scorpion goddess.	WGPSN
Hershef	47.39°N 90.62°E	120	2000	Hershef, Egyptian ram-headed god.	WGPSN
Humbaba	55.15°S 67.31°W	40	2000	Humbaba, Babylonian terrifying guardian of the cedar forests.	WGPSN
Ilah	22°N 160.62°W	76	1985	Ilah, First Sumerian sky god.	WGPSN
Ilus	13.46°S 110.43°W	90	1985	Ilus, Ganymede's brother.	WGPSN
Irkalla	32.52°S 114.84°W	117	1985	Irkalla, Sumerian goddess of underworld, seen by Enkidu in a dream.	WGPSN
Ishkur	0.37°N 8.37°W	67	1985	Ishkur, Sumerian god of rain.	WGPSN
Isimu	8.5°N 8.37°W	89.5	1985	Isimu, Sumerian god of vegetation.	WGPSN
Isis	67.28°S 158.8°E	75	1979	Isis, Egyptian goddess; wife of Osiris.	WGPSN
Kadi	47.68°N 178.5°W	87	1985	Kadi, Babylonian goddess of justice.	WGPSN
Khensu	1.02°N 152.93°W	17	1997	Khensu, Egyptian moon god.	WGPSN
Khepri	20.41°N 147.56°W	47	1997	Khepri, God of transformations for the Heliopitans.	WGPSN
Khonsu	37.51°S 169.17°E	80	1988	Khonsu, Egyptian moon god.	WGPSN
Khumbam	24.1°S 24.65°E	57	1979	Khumbam, Assyro-Babylonian; Elamite creator god.	WGPSN
Kingu	34.66°S 132.97°E	78	1988	Kingu, Assyro-Babylonian; conquered leader of Tiamat's forces whose blood was used to create man.	WGPSN
Kishar	72.7°N 10.54°E	78	1979	Kishar, Assyro-Babylonian; terrestrial progenitor goddess.	WGPSN
Kittu	0.4°N 25.4°E	15	1985	Kittu, Assyro-Babylonian god of justice.	WGPSN
Kulla	33.22°N 113.87°W	93	1985	Kulla, Sumerian god of brick making.	WGPSN
Lagamal	64.3°N 115.79°E	131	2000	Lagamal, Son of Babylonian god Ea.	WGPSN
Laomedon /leɪˈɒmədɒn/	20.9°N 77.9°W	64	2019	Laomedon, king of Troy, nephew of Ganymede.	WGPSN
Latpon	58.74°N 171.21°W	43	1997	Latpon, One of the sons of El.	WGPSN
Lugalmeslam	23.72°N 166.11°E	64	1997	Lugalmeslam, Sumerian god of the underworld.	WGPSN
Lumha	36.01°N 154.23°W	58	1985	Lumha, Title of Enki as patron of singers; also Babylonian priest.	WGPSN
Maa	1.3°N 156.37°E	31	1997	Maa, Egyptian god of the sense of sight.	WGPSN
Mehit	28.95°N 164.39°W	47	1985	Mehit, Egyptian lion-headed goddess; Anhur's wife.	WGPSN
Melkart	9.86°S 173.93°E	105	1979	Melkart, Phoenician; divinity of Tyre.	WGPSN
Menhit	36.31°S 140.32°W	140	2006	Menhit, Egyptian lion and war goddess.	WGPSN
Min	29.23°N 1.26°W	33	1988	Min, Egyptian fertility god.	WGPSN
Mir	3.3°S 129.7°E	8	1985	Mir, West Semitic god of wind.	WGPSN
Misharu	4.31°S 24.11°E	88	1985	Misharu, Assyro-Babylonian god of law.	WGPSN
Mont	44.62°N 48.05°E	15	1997	Mont, Theban war god.	WGPSN
Mor	30.55°N 32.65°E	41	1979	Mor, Phoenician; spirit of the harvest.	WGPSN
Mot	9.93°N 165.95°W	23	1997	Mot, Spirit of the harvest, one of the sons of El.	WGPSN
Mush	15.12°S 114.77°W	99	1985	Mush, Sumerian male deity; upper parts are human, lower parts a serpent.	WGPSN
Nabu	45.39°S 1.19°W	40	1979	Nabu, Sumerian god of intellectual activity.	WGPSN
Nah-Hunte	17.76°S 85.26°W	47	2000	Nah-Hunte, Elamite god of light and justice.	WGPSN
Namtar	58.34°S 19.3°E	50	1979	Namtar, Assyro-Babylonian plague demon.	WGPSN
Nanna	17.61°S 118.13°E	56	1985	Nanna, Sumerian moon god; god of wisdom.	WGPSN
Nefertum	44.35°N 38.96°E	29	1997	Nefertum, Original divine son of the Memphis triad, son of Ptah.	WGPSN
Neheh	72.13°N 62.66°W	54	1985	Neheh, Egyptian god of eternity.	WGPSN
Neith	29.45°N 6.97°W	90	1988	Neith, Egyptian warrior goddess; goddess of domestic arts.	WGPSN
Nergal	38.58°N 159.67°E	9.6	1997	Nergal, Assyro-Babylonian king of the underworld.	WGPSN
Nidaba	17.75°N 123.43°W	199	1985	Nidaba, Sumerian grain goddess.	WGPSN
Nigirsu	58.26°S 39.43°E	53	1979	Nigirsu, Assyro-Babylonian; god of the fields, war god.	WGPSN
Ningishzida	14.11°N 170.16°E	32	1997	Ningishzida, Sumerian vegetation god.	WGPSN
Ninkasi	59.21°N 48.85°W	81	1988	Ninkasi, Sumerian goddess of brewing.	WGPSN
Ninki	8.37°S 120.79°W	194	1985	Ninki, Consort to Ea, Babylonian god of water.	WGPSN
Ninlil	6.27°N 118.32°W	91	1985	Ninlil, Chief Assyrian goddess; Asshur's consort.	WGPSN
Ninsum	14.35°S 140.55°W	88	1985	Ninsum, Minor Babylonian goddess of wisdom; Gilgamesh's mother.	WGPSN
Nut	54.21°S 90.8°E	90	1979	Nut, Egyptian goddess of the sky.	WGPSN
Ombos	4.75°N 123.84°E	177	2013	Ombos, Egyptian town where Sebek's triad worshiped; present Kom Ombo.	WGPSN
Osiris	38°S 166.31°W	107	1979	Osiris, Egyptian god of the dead.	WGPSN
Ptah	65.9°S 142.95°E	30	1988	Ptah, Sovereign god of Memphis; patron of artisans.	WGPSN
Punt	24.89°S 120.15°E	135	1997	Punt, Land east of Egypt where Bes originated. Changed from Punt Facula.	WGPSN
Ruti	13.23°N 51.35°E	16	1979	Ruti, Phoenician; Byblos god.	WGPSN
Saltu	14.15°S 7.23°E	40	2006	Saltu, Babylonian goddess of discord and hostility.	WGPSN
Sapas	57.45°N 33.99°W	56	1979	Shapash, Assyro-Babylonian; torch of the gods.	WGPSN
Sati	30.84°N 12.8°W	95	1988	Sati, Wife of Khnum, Egyptian god of the Cataracts.	WGPSN
Sebek	61.25°N 3.22°E	61	1979	Sebek, Egyptian crocodile god.	WGPSN
Seima	17.09°N 144.03°E	38	1985	Seima, Mother goddess of the Arameans.	WGPSN
Seker	39.16°S 14.62°E	103	1988	Seker, Egyptian god of the dead at Memphis.	WGPSN
Selket	15.03°N 105.7°W	168	1985	Selket, Tutelary goddess who guarded intestines of the dead.	WGPSN
Serapis	12.4°S 44.11°W	169	1997	Serapis, Egyptian healing god.	WGPSN
Shu	43.16°N 3.16°E	44	1988	Shu, Egyptian god of air.	WGPSN
Sin	52.94°N 2.54°E	19	1979	Sin, Babylonian moon god.	WGPSN
Tammuz	13.45°N 129.24°E	51	1985	Tammuz, Akkadian youthful god of vegetation	WGPSN
Tanit	57.49°N 36.62°W	26	1979	Tanit, Assyro-Babylonian; Carthaginian goddess.	WGPSN
Tashmetum	39.72°S 95.46°E	135	2000	Tashmetum, Assyro-Babylonian goddess who invented writing with her husband Nabu.	WGPSN
Ta-urt	27.66°N 55.8°E	94	1988	Taurt, Egyptian childbirth goddess.	WGPSN
Teshub	68.3°S 80.72°E	188	1994	Teshub, Elamite god of the tempest.	WGPSN
Thoth	43.22°S 147.25°W	102	1985	Thoth, Egyptian moon god; invented all arts and sciences.	WGPSN
Tros	11.14°N 27.26°W	94	1979	Tros, Greek; father of Ganymede.	WGPSN
Upuant	46.4°N 40.46°E	17	1997	Upuant, Jackal-headed warrior god, god of the dead.	WGPSN
We-ila	12.36°S 69.65°E	36	2000	We-ila, Akkadian god from whom the hero Atra-hasis was created.	WGPSN
Wepwawet	69.89°S 59.81°W	86	2000	Wepwawet, Ancient Egyptian jackal deity.	WGPSN
Zakar	31.28°N 26.33°E	170	1997	Zakar, Assyrian supreme deity.	WGPSN
Zaqar	58.16°N 37.41°W	33	1979	Zaqar, Assyro-Babylonian; Sin's messenger who brought dreams to men.	WGPSN

back to top

=== Dropped or not approved names ===
Crater	Coordinates	Diameter (km)	Approval Year	Eponym	Ref
Keret	16.0°N 35.2°W	36.0	1979	Dropped. Keret, Phoenician hero. Name dropped because feature not found on imagery.	WGPSN
Khnum	17.8°S 85.2°W	45.0	–	Not approved named. Khnum, Egyptian ram-headed creation god. Note: Provisional name Khnum changed to Nah-Hunte because of duplication with Khnum Catena.	WGPSN
Wadjet	53.8°S 268.9°W	100.0	2000	Dropped name. Wadjet, Egyptian cobra goddess. Same crater as Nut.	WGPSN

back to top
