= List of quadrangles on Ganymede =

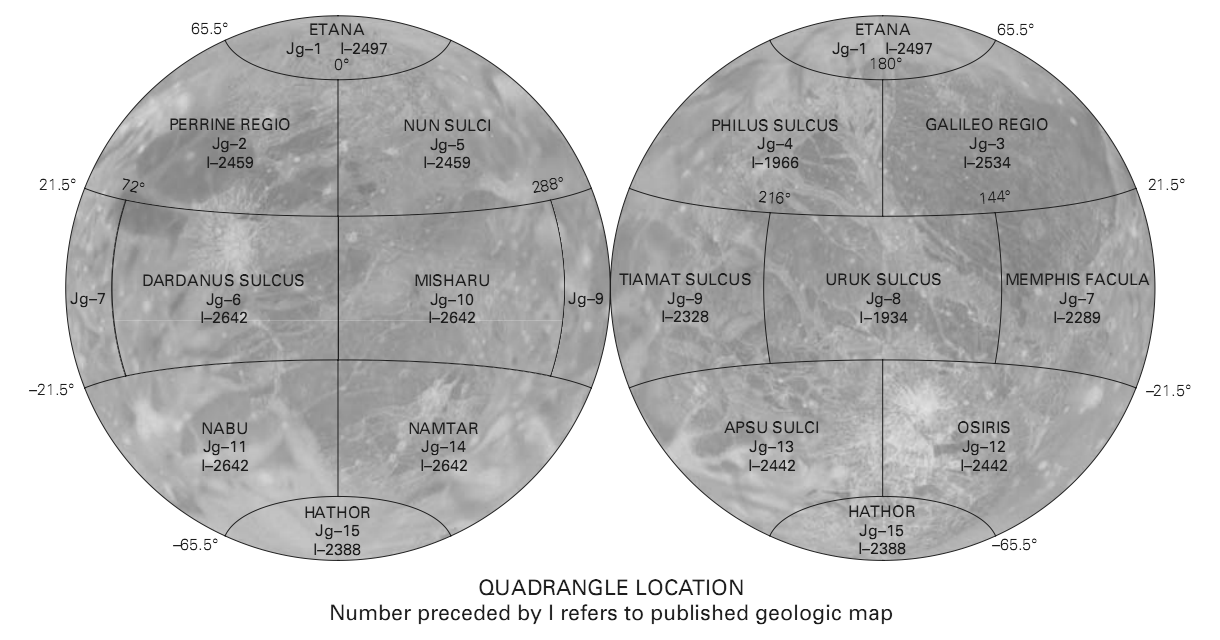
The arrangement of the quadrangles on Ganymede

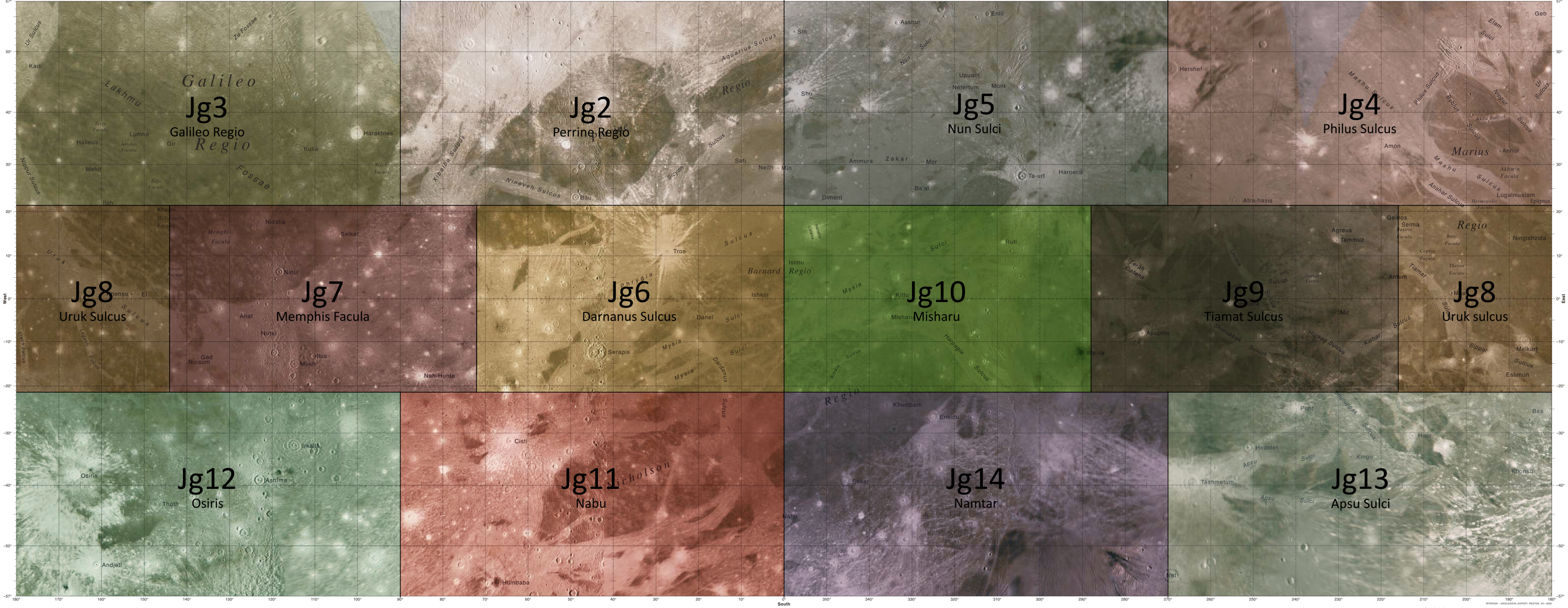
A Mercator projection of the arrangement of the quadrangles on Ganymede except at the poles

Ganymede has been divided into 15 quadrangles.

Name	Number	Latitude	Longitude
Etana	Jg1	65-90° N	0-360° W
Perrine Regio	Jg2	21-66° N	0-90° W
Galileo Regio	Jg3	21-66° N	90-180° W
Philus Sulcus	Jg4	21-66° N	180-270° W
Nun Sulci	Jg5	21-66° N	270-360° W
Dardanus Sulcus	Jg6	22° N-22° S	0-72° W
Memphis Facula	Jg7	22° N-22° S	72-144° W
Uruk Sulcus	Jg8	22° N-22° S	144-216° W
Tiamat Sulcus	Jg9	22° N-22° S	216-288° W
Misharu	Jg10	22° N-22° S	288-360° W
Nabu	Jg11	21-66° S	0-90° W
Osiris	Jg12	21-66° S	90-180° W
Apsu Sulci	Jg13	21-66° S	180-270° W
Namtar	Jg14	21-66° S	270-360° W
Hathor	Jg15	65-90° S	0-360° W

== See also ==
- List of geological features on Ganymede
- List of craters on Ganymede
