= Osiris (Ganymede crater) =

Crater on Ganymede

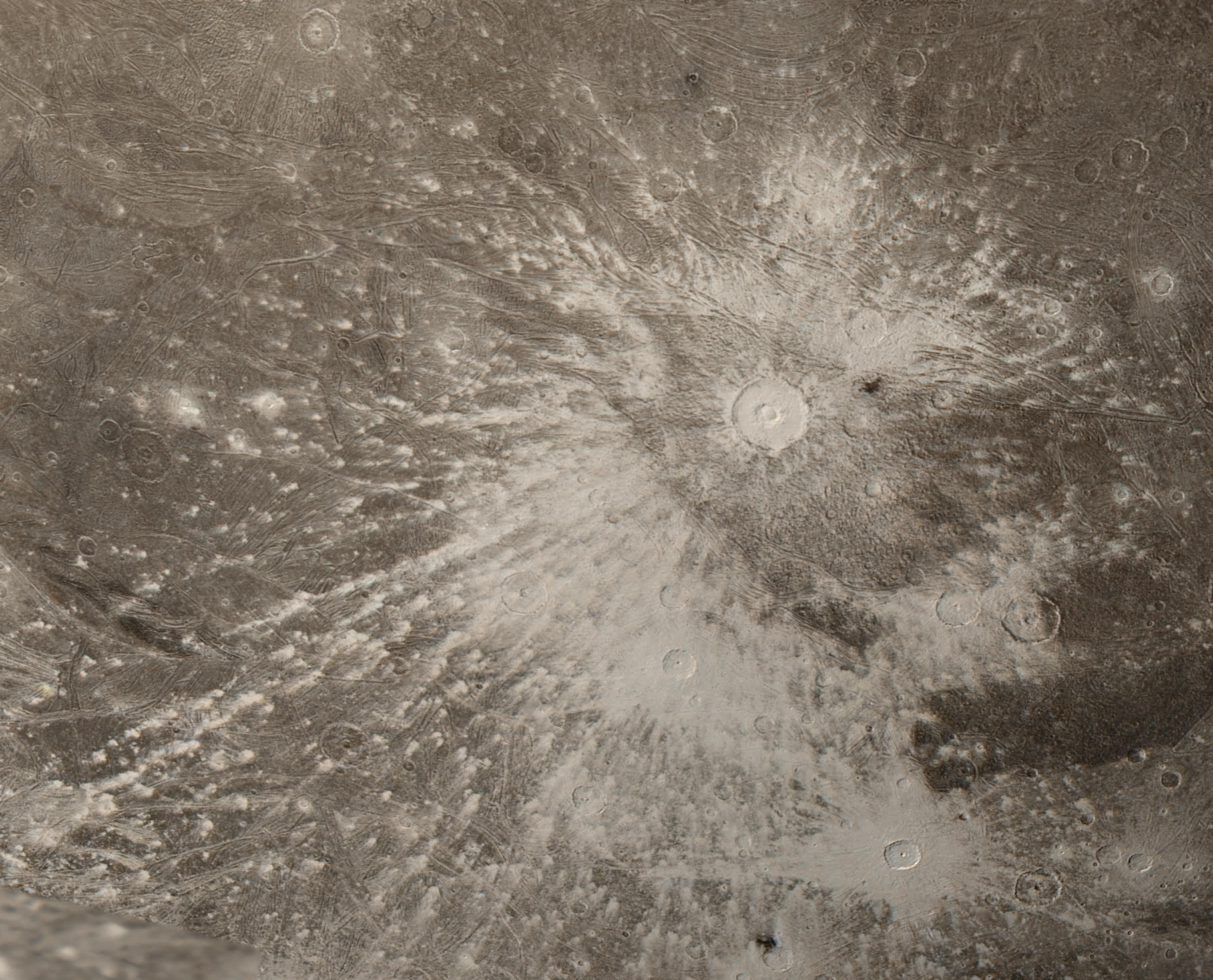
- A mosaic image of Osiris crater and its bright rays, imaged by Voyager 2 in July 1979
- Feature type: Concentric dome ray crater
- Coordinates: 38.00°S 166.31°W
- Diameter: 107 kilometres (66 mi)
- Eponym: Osiris

Osiris is a prominent crater on Jupiter's moon Ganymede. It has two crater rims— a very small one at the center and a larger one that completely surrounds the other. The crater's outer rim is approximately 107 kilometres (66 mi) wide. At the center of crater lies a dome that is around 0.5 kilometres (0.31 mi) high relative to the surrounding depression.

== Naming ==
Osiris is named after the Egyptian god Osiris, the ruler of the Egyptian afterlife who was resurrected after he was killed and dismembered by his brother Set. The name was approved by the International Astronomical Union (IAU) in 1979.

The crater's name follows the IAU rule that craters and other features on Ganymede should be named after deities, heroes and places from Ancient Middle Eastern mythologies, which include Egyptian mythology. Nearby surface features such as Isis (Osiris' wife) and Thoth (Osiris' advisor and divine scribe) share the same Egyptian mythology theme.

== Geography and Location ==
Osiris is an intermediate-sized crater on Ganymede. Its outer rim is 107 kilometres (66 mi) wide, while its inner crater rim is only a few dozens of kilometers wide. The outer rim rises approximately 0.8 kilometres (0.50 mi) above the plains surrounding the crater. The inner, circular trench surrounding the central dome is around 1 kilometre (0.62 mi) deep compared to Ganymede's average surface level while the outer circular trench is only around 0.5 kilometres (0.31 mi) deep.

Osiris' rays stretch thousands of kilometers further towards the southwest compared to other directions where they stretch for only few hundred kilometers.

Several craters such as Andjeti to the south overlaps with Osiris' rays. In addition, a prominent dark splotch can be seen a few kilometers to the east of Osiris.

To the north, Marius Regio borders Osiris, with the Sippar Sulcus forming the boundary between them. To the east lies the pit crater the Thoth and the ancient dome crater called Menhit. Three hundred fifty kilometers to the crater's southeast, a dark rectangular area (west of Yaroun Patera) interrupts the rays emanating from Osiris. The exact mechanism on how this formation came to be is not yet known. To the west of Osiris lie Mummu Sulci, as well as Rum and Musa Paterae, while to the northwest is the named halo crater Bes.

The section of Ganymede's surface around Osiris crater is called the Osiris quadrangle (designated as Jg12) which is named after its most prominent feature. However, the crater rays emanating from Osiris toward the southwest intrude into the neighboring Apsu and Hathor quadrangles.

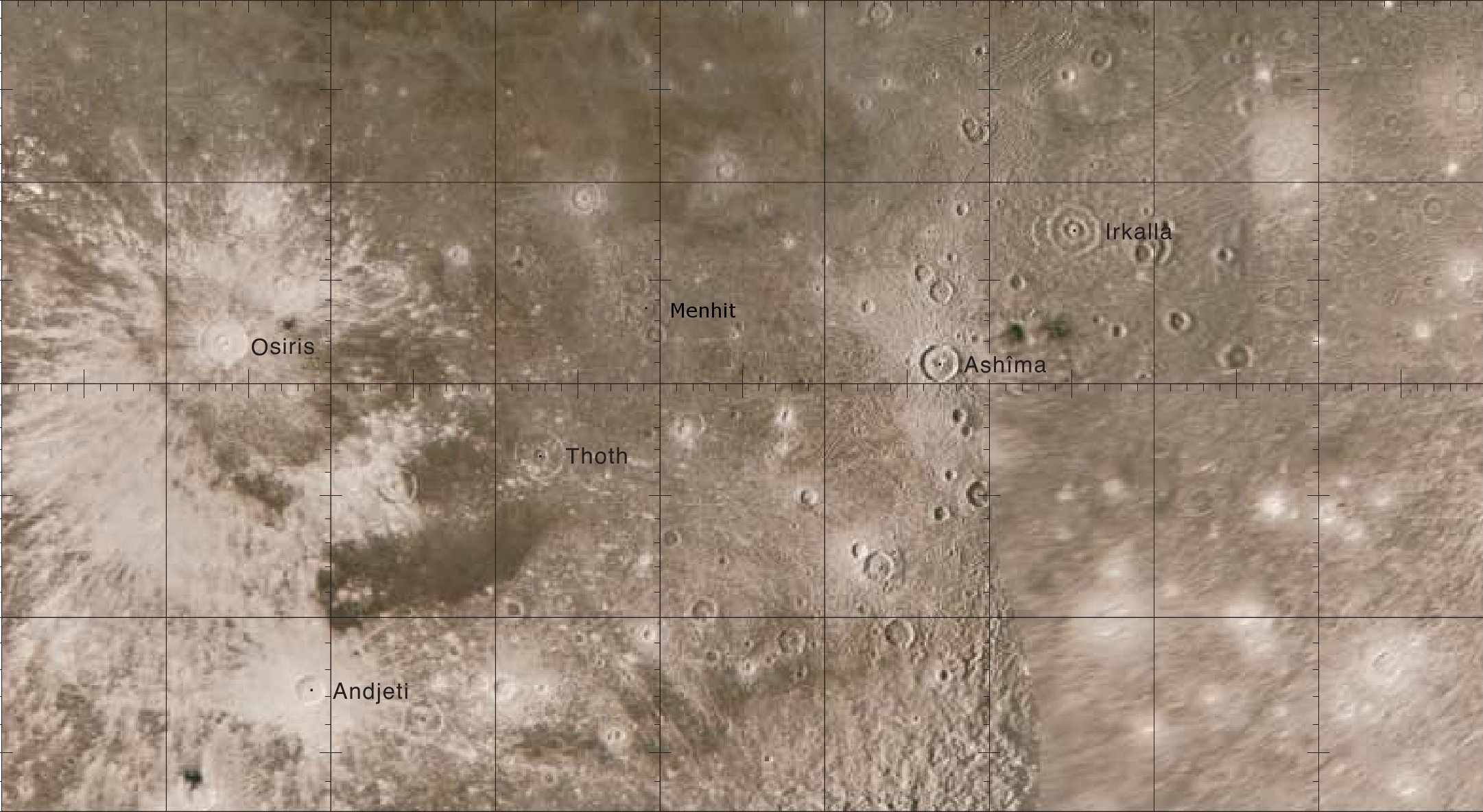
The Osiris quadrangle where the crater is located.

Osiris is located on the opposite side of the point on Ganymede that always faces Jupiter—due to the fact that Ganymede orbits its parent planet in a synchronous rotation. This means that an observer on Osiris will never see Jupiter in the sky.

== Geology ==
Osiris is a very bright concentric ray crater. The massive asteroid that created it excavated huge amounts of bright, icy materials from beneath the moon's surface, before flinging them away in all directions around the impact site, forming a bright ray system. Both the inside of the crater and its rays are equally very bright and fresh-looking. Spectral analyses suggest that the crater is very young and the bright materials and that the bright materials are composed of pure water ice, which is a good reflector of light. The ray craters on the leading of Ganymede (including Osiris) appear to be brighter and younger than similar ray craters found on the opposite trailing hemisphere such as Hershef.

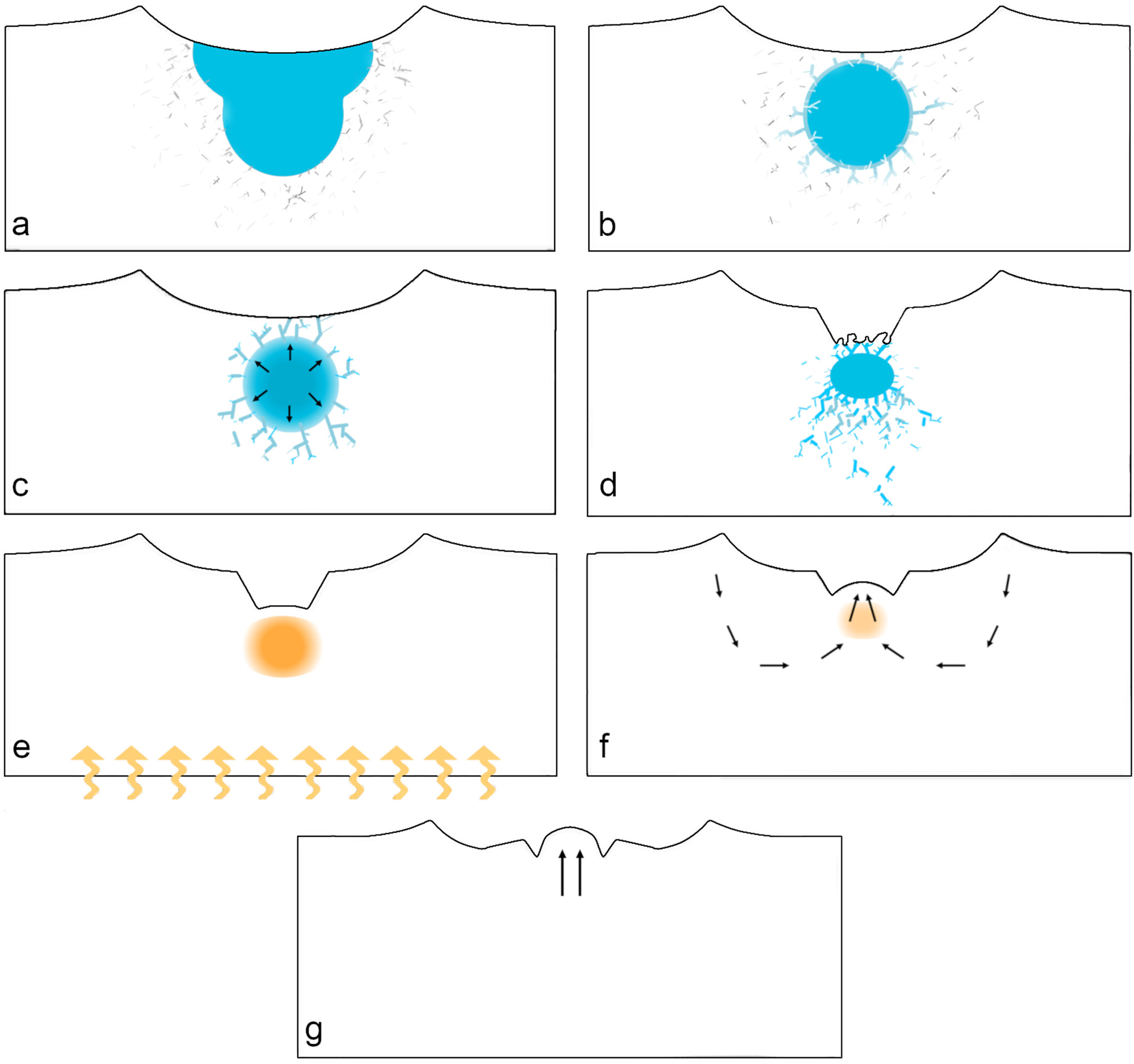
A diagram showing the steps in the formation of dome craters on icy moons. It shows how the refreezing of meltwater from meteorite impacts can cause both the formation of sinkholes and the dome-forming expansion of an icy crust.

The exact age of the crater is not yet known, but its value can be constrained by examining other nearby craters that are superimposed on Osiris' rays—such as an unnamed 1.4 kilometer crater. Depending on the model that was used, the crater can be as young as 50 million years old (Jupiter‑Comet model) or as old 2.15 billion years old (Lunar‑Derived model). Sharper images and more spectral analyses of Osiris are necessary to determine a more accurate age for the crater.

The central dome of Osiris is believed to have formed within 10 million years after the crater itself was created. Research suggest that it was caused by meltwater that formed under crater as the heat generated by the asteroid impact melted the moon's icy surface. As the meltwater refroze, it caused cracks and damages to form beneath the crater, which led to the collapse of the crater's central part and the formation of a circular pit. Then, as more meltwater continued to freeze, it expanded—since water expands when it freezes—pushing up the center of the crater and creating an icy dome, and turning the circular pit into a circular trench. Compared to similar but older dome-type craters such as Neith, younger ray craters like Osiris have brighter rays because their ray deposits have not yet been erased by space weathering. Domes usually only form if a crater is more than 60 kilometers wide.

== Exploration and Observation ==
Osiris's extreme brightness makes it easy to observe, even from a great distance. The crater is so bright that it can be seen by the Hubble Space Telescope even when it is hundreds of millions of kilometers from Jupiter. Osiris can also be observed with amateur telescopes that have sufficient resolving power.

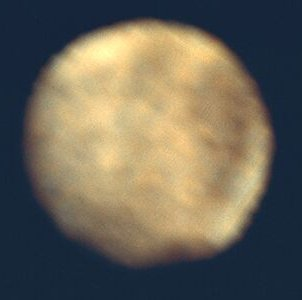
This extremely low-resolution image of Ganymede, taken by Pioneer 10 in December 1973, barely shows the first-ever image of Osiris (upper left).

The first photographs of Osiris were taken by Pioneer 10 in December 1973. However, the photographs were of very low quality.

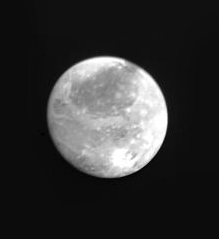
A distant image of Ganymede, taken by Voyager 1 in February 1979. This side of Ganymede is the one that is always facing away from Jupiter. Osiris is the bright spot at the bottom of the image.

Similarly, Voyager 1 imaged Osiris only from a distance during its approach to the Jovian system in late February 1979. At the time of the probe's closest approach to Ganymede in March 1979, the crater had rotated onto the moon's far side, preventing the acquisition of high-resolution images. Therefore, Voyager 2 became the first spacecraft to send clear images of the crater.

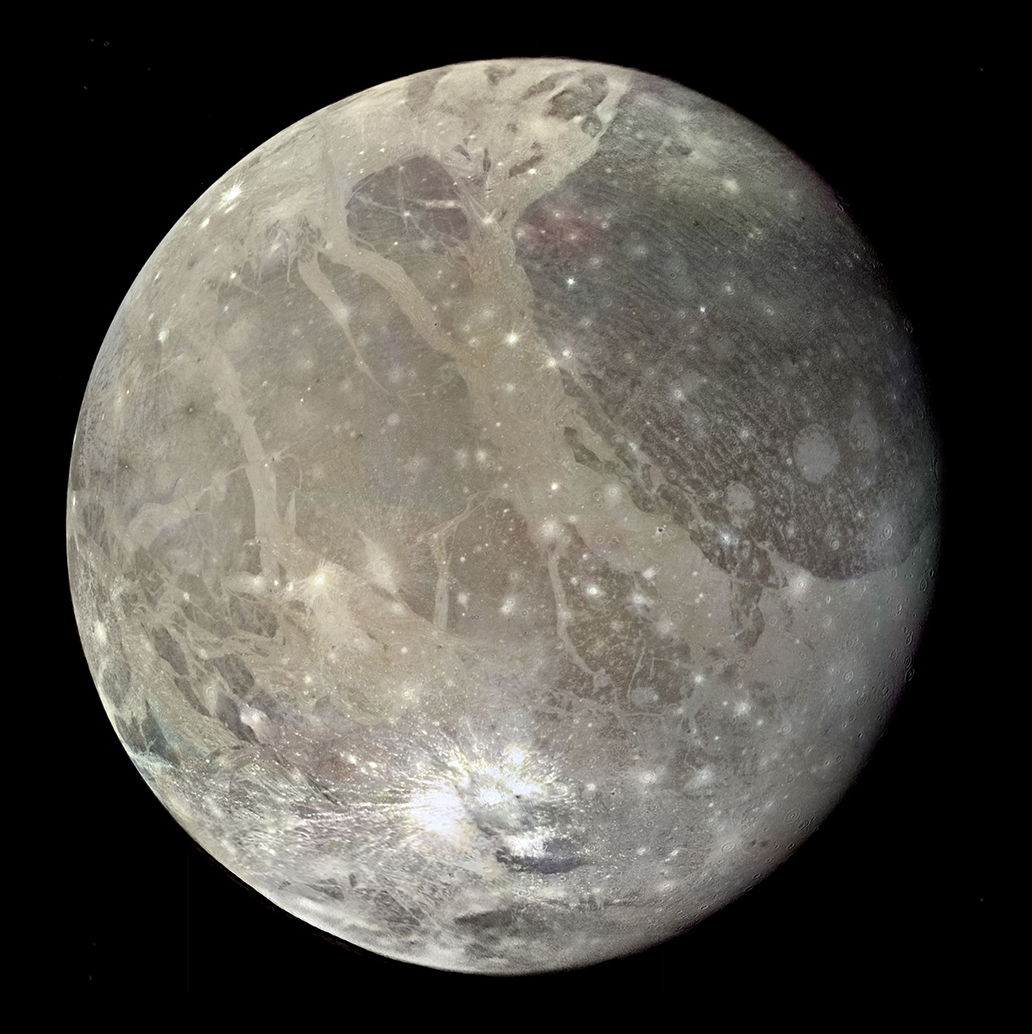
Osiris crater (lower center) as seen in this global image of Ganymede taken by Voyager 2 in July 1979

As of 2025, Osiris has been observed in moderate detail by Voyager 2 during its July 1979 flyby and by the Galileo spacecraft during its mission in the Jovian system from 1995 to 2003. Voyager 2's slightly southward trajectory toward its next destination, Saturn, enabled it to image Ganymede's southern hemisphere, where Osiris is located, in medium detail.

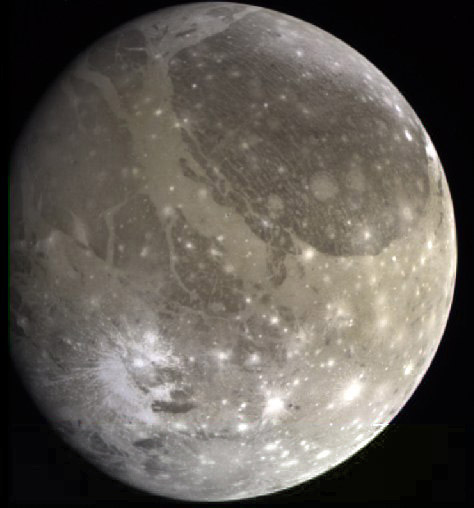
Osiris crater (lower left) on Ganymede, as imaged by the Galileo space probe in June 1996

The Galileo space probe also obtained medium-resolution images of Osiris, similar to Voyager 2's photographs. However, it did not have an opportunity to image the crater at higher resolution. During its mission, Galileo obtained close-up images of only two bright-ray craters on Ganymede: Achelous and Melkart.

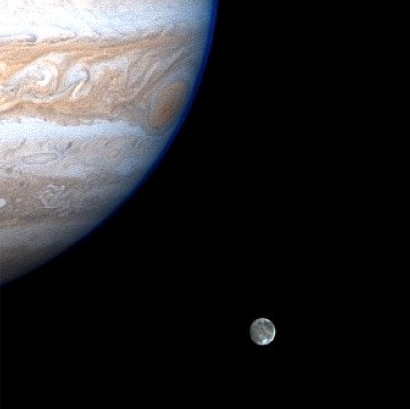
An image of Ganymede together with Jupiter, taken by the Cassini probe in December, 2000. The bright spot on the south of Ganymede's surface is the Osiris crater, which is still clearly visible despite the fact that the image was taken from a distance of 10,350,000 kilometres (6,430,000 mi).

Osiris was approaching the moon's terminator when Cassini made its two closest approaches to Ganymede as it flew by the Jovian system in December 2000. The images that Cassini sent back during both of its closest approaches were low-resolution due to the immense distance between the moon and the probe.

New Horizons was unable to photograph Osiris during its flyby of Jupiter in February 2007 because the crater was on Ganymede's night side during the probe's closest approach. As the spacecraft entered and departed the Jovian system, it remained on the opposite side of the moon, preventing it from imaging the crater. Similarly, during the Juno space probe's 34th perijove (closest approach to Jupiter) in its orbit around Jupiter, it made a close flyby of Ganymede to adjust its trajectory, but it was only able to image the opposite side of the moon from Osiris. This was Juno's only flyby of Ganymede so no image of Osiris was taken.

=== Future missions ===
The European Space Agency's (ESA) Jupiter Icy Moons Explorer (Juice) is scheduled to arrive at Jupiter in July 2031. After spending around three and a half years in orbit around Jupiter and performing multiple flybys of Europa, Callisto and Ganymede, Juice will settle into a low orbit around Ganymede at a distance of just 500 kilometres (310 mi). Juice is expected to be able to photograph Osiris at the highest resolution possible.

In fact, according to a publication by the European Planetary Science Congress, Osiris is considered as one of the Juice's' most important and valuable targets.

== See also ==
- List of craters on Ganymede
- Meteor
