= Hathor (crater) =

Crater on Ganymede

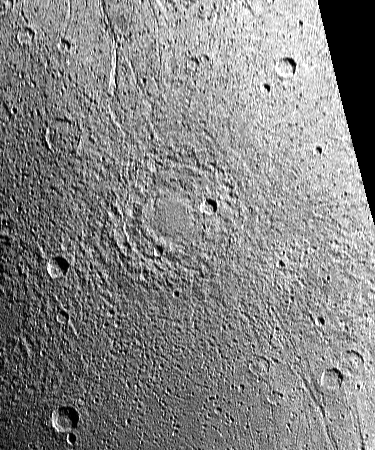
- A photo of Hathor crater, taken by Voyager 2 on July 9, 1979.
- Feature type: Penepalimpsest
- Coordinates: 66.90°S 268.74°W
- Diameter: 173 kilometres (107 mi)
- Eponym: Hathor

Hathor is a highly disrupted, dome-shaped penepalimpsest on Ganymede, the largest moon of Jupiter. It is believed that Hathor is a very ancient crater in the process of being completely erased.

== Naming ==
Hathor crater is named after a very important cow-headed goddess from Egyptian mythology called Hathor. Hathor was an extremely popular goddess of love, happiness, fertility, festivals, and the sky, and she was so popular that her worship spread to cultures outside of Egypt. She may have been a daughter of Ra, the Egyptian king of the gods, who relied heavily on her in several stories and legends to carry out his will.

The International Astronomical Union (IAU) chose the name Hathor in line with the convention that craters on Ganymede should be named after deities, figures and places from Ancient Middle Eastern mythology, such as Egyptian mythology.

The name was approved in 1979.

== Location ==
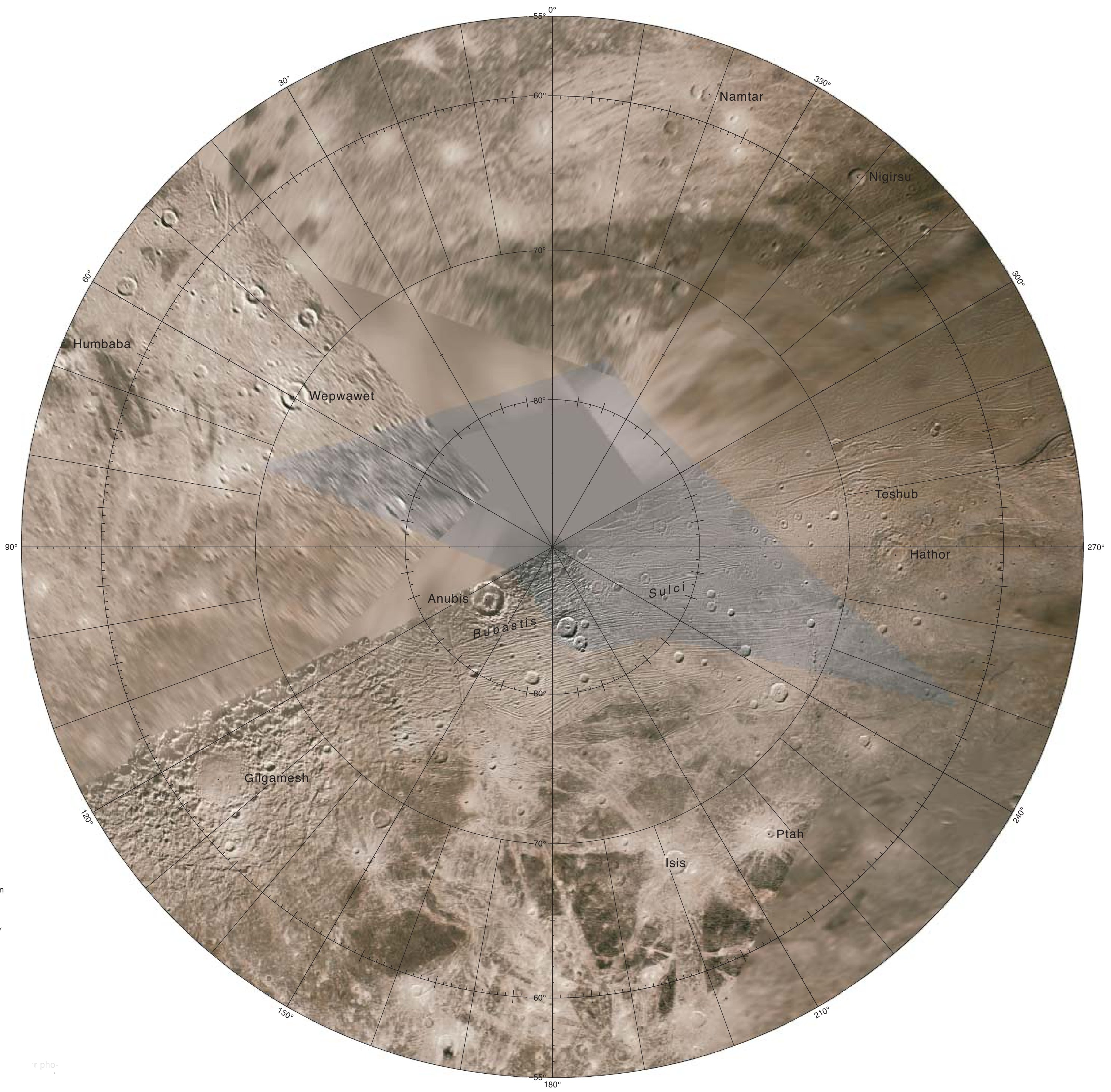
A map of the south polar area of Ganymede, showing the location of Hathor crater.

Hathor is located near the south pole of Ganymede, about two-thirds of the way from the moon's equator to its pole. The crater lies at the western end of a bright, grooved terrain feature that wraps around the southern hemisphere of Ganymede, called Bubastis Sulci.

To Hathor's west, less than fifty kilometers away, is another distorted crater called Teshub.

Hathor is located within the Hathor quadrangle of Ganymede (designated Jg15). This quadrangle is named after Hathor crater.

== Geology ==
Hathor is described as a very old multi-ring impact basin. Its transient cavity radius is estimated at ~60 kilometres (37 mi) based on secondary crater scaling. It has multiple outer rings, indicating significant structural response of the crust. It formed on the grooved terrain Bubastis Sulci, meaning the area was probably already tectonically modified before impact. Unlike other related craters such as Gilgamesh, no ghost craters have been observed around Hathor.

A study by Thomas, Forni and Masson from the Université de Paris XI (now subsumed into Paris-Saclay University) argues that the excavation boundary does not correspond simply to the edge of the smooth central area. Instead, they propose that the true transient cavity limit lies somewhat farther outward, at one of the concentric ridges surrounding the center. To estimate its size, they apply scaling relationships derived from lunar craters, particularly the observed ratio between the largest secondary crater radius and the main cavity radius (approximately 1/15). Using the maximum observed secondary crater size of about 4 kilometres (2.5 mi) for Hathor, they calculate a theoretical transient cavity radius of roughly 60 kilometres (37 mi). This value corresponds most closely to one of the inner concentric ridges.

Although they acknowledge that such calculations cannot determine the excavation boundary precisely, they argue that this method provides a reasonable approximation. Based on this analysis, they tentatively conclude that the transient cavity limit of Hathor lies outside the smooth central depression and is marked by one of the surrounding concentric structural ridges.

Based on the maps in the study, the authors probably mistakenly labeled Hathor crater as the Eastern Hathor basin and instead named the nearby Teshub crater to the west as Hathor crater.

== Morphology ==
Hathor is an unusual and anomalous dome crater on Ganymede. It resembles other dome craters scattered across Ganymede's surface, including Neith and Serapis. According to a short study by Dr. White, the icy Galilean satellites Ganymede and Callisto display a wide range of impact crater morphologies that differ markedly from those found on rocky bodies such as the Earth's Moon and Mercury. These differences are attributed to variations in impactor size and to the physical properties of the moons' ice shells at the time of impact, including the presence of cold, rigid surface water ice, warmer ductile ice at depth, and even subsurface liquid water.

Larger impact features, including anomalous dome craters like Hathor, typically show lower relief and more subdued rims and floors. These craters are interpreted as forming when impacts penetrated through the cold surface ice into an underlying mechanically weak layer of warm, ductile ice.

== Formation ==
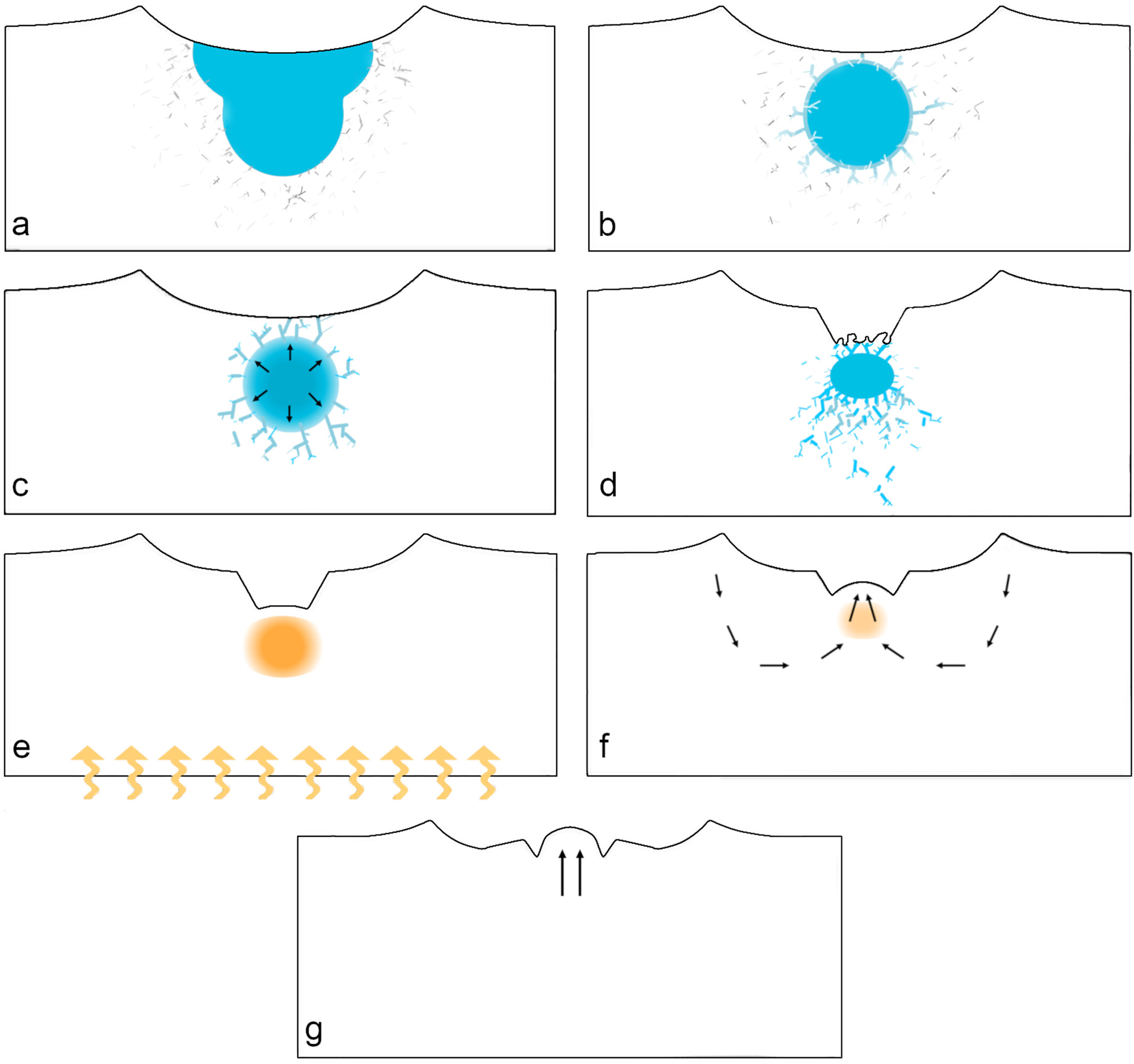
A diagram showing the steps in the formation of pits dome craters on icy moons. It shows how the refreezing of meltwater from meteorite impacts can cause both the formation of sinkholes and the dome-forming expansion of an icy crust.

According to the study by Thomas et al., at the time and place of the Hathor crater impact, the crust of Ganymede at the impact site was less than ~12 kilometres (7.5 mi) km thick. The study contrasted this with another study that suggested it was less than 6 kilometres (3.7 mi) thick, which would imply much faster planetary cooling. The authors instead argue that a slow lithospheric thickening happened over long periods of time.

In interpreting ring formation at the Hathor Basin on Ganymede, the authors rely on the model proposed by McKinnon and Melosh (1980), which relates the number of outer rings to the ratio between lithospheric thickness and transient cavity depth. According to this model, if the lithosphere is thicker than the cavity depth, no outer rings form beyond the cavity; if it is approximately equal in thickness, only one or a few outer rings develop; and if it is thinner than the cavity depth, multiple concentric outer rings are produced. Because Hathor exhibits a well-developed multi-ring system, the authors conclude that the lithosphere at the time of impact must have been thinner than the transient cavity depth. This interpretation supports their broader argument that Ganymede's lithosphere was relatively thin during the formation of Hathor and thickened gradually over time.

Impact melt is considered to have played a secondary role in the development of dome craters, which primarily form through deformation and relaxation within warm subsurface ice. Research suggests that dome structures developed when meltwater accumulated beneath a crater after impact heating melted portions of the icy surface. As this meltwater refroze, it produced fracturing and structural weakening beneath the crater floor, causing collapse of the central area and the formation of a circular pit. Continued freezing then led to volumetric expansion—since water expands upon freezing—uplifting the crater's center into an icy dome and converting the pit into a circular trench. Dome craters of this type are generally observed only in craters with diameters exceeding approximately 60 kilometres (37 mi).

Smaller impact structures, such as pit craters and dome craters, are generally younger and exhibit relatively pronounced topographic relief. These features are interpreted as having formed within a cold, rigid near-surface ice layer. Their distinctive central pits and surrounding annular features are thought to result from the drainage and subsequent refreezing of subsurface pockets of melt generated during the impact event.

== Exploration ==
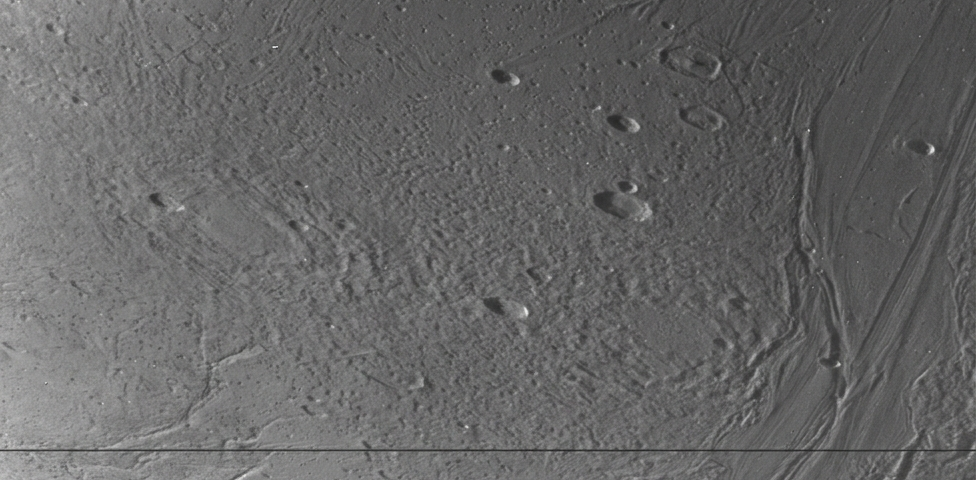
An image of the twin basins Hathor (left), and Teshub (right), taken by Voyager 2 during its flyby of Ganymede in July 1979.

As of 2026, only one spacecraft has been able to properly image Hathor crater — Voyager 2. The probe captured images of Hathor and Ganymede's south polar region in July 1979, thanks to its slightly southward trajectory through the Jovian system on its way to its next target, Saturn.

Hathor crater's location near Ganymede's south pole, combined with the relatively low axial and orbital tilt of Ganymede with respect to the Sun, makes it difficult to observe using flyby spacecraft.

=== Future Missions ===
The European Space Agency (ESA) space probe Jupiter Icy Moons Explorer (Juice) is scheduled to arrive at Jupiter in July 2031.

In July 2034, Juice will enter a low orbit around Ganymede at an altitude of just 500 kilometres (310 mi), allowing the spacecraft to observe Ganymede's polar regions much more closely and repeatedly — areas that are easily missed by flyby missions.

== See also ==
- List of craters on Ganymede
- Meteor
