= Erichthonius (crater) =

Crater on Ganymede

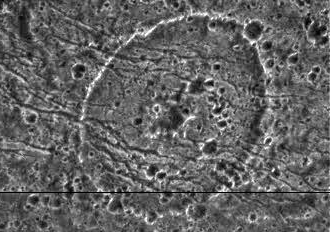
- A mosaic image of Erichthonius crater, taken by the Galileo space probe on 7 May 1997
- Feature type: Strained Pit Crater
- Coordinates: 15.32°S 175.26°W
- Diameter: 31 kilometres (19 mi)
- Eponym: Εριχθόνιος της Τρωάδος (Erichthonius the Trojan)

Erichthonius is a crater south of the equator of Jupiter's largest moon Ganymede. It is a small crater with a pit at its center and an outer rim with a diameter of approximately 31 kilometres (19 mi).

== Naming ==
Erichthonius is named after a king of Troy who was either the grandfather of the mythological Trojan prince Ganymede (according to Homer), or the father of Ganymede (according to Hyginus).

The crater's name follows the International Astronomical Union's (IAU) convention of naming craters on Ganymede after deities, heroes, and places from Ancient Near Eastern mythologies, or after relatives of Ganymede, the mythological prince from whom the moon takes its name. Erichthonius belongs to the latter category. The IAU approved the name for Erichthonius in 1997.

== Geography and location ==
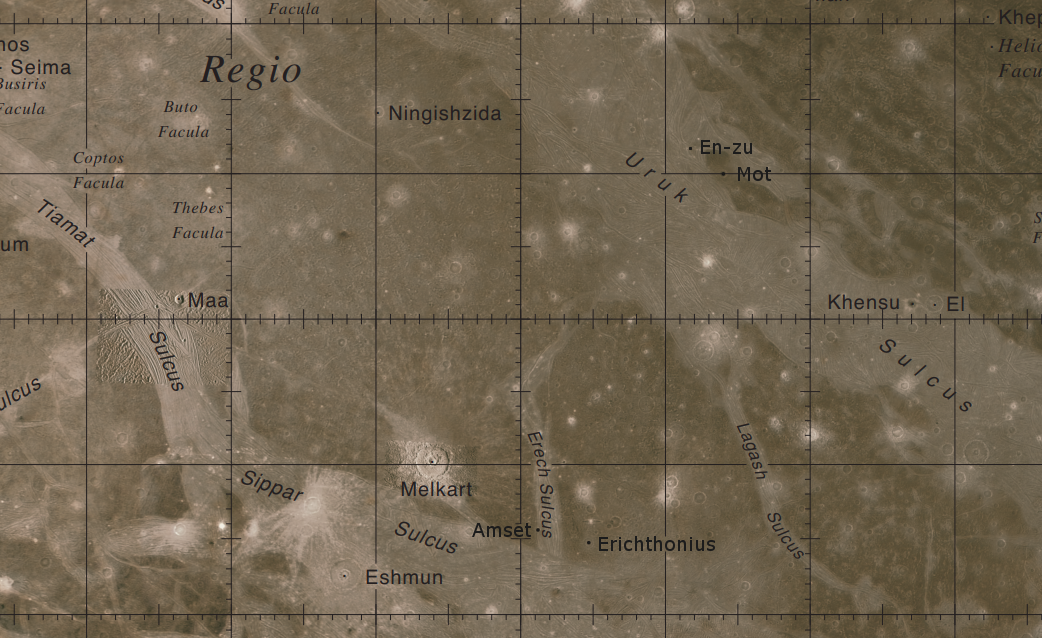
A map of the Uruk Sulcus quadrangle on Ganymede. Erichthonius crater lies in the far south.

Erichthonius is located a few kilometers south of Ganymede's equator, within the southern section of a dark, ancient region on Ganymede called Marius Regio.

The crater sits at the junction of two younger, grooved terrains—Erech Sulcus and Sippar Sulcus—at their northeastern corner. To the west of Erichthonius lie Erech Sulcus and the craters Amset and Eshmun; to its south is Sippar Sulcus, while to its north and east are several unnamed ray and halo craters.

Erichthonius is located within the Uruk Sulcus quadrangle (or section) of Ganymede (designated Jg8).

Because Ganymede is in synchronous rotation with Jupiter, one hemisphere of the moon always faces its parent planet, while the opposite hemisphere never does. Erichthonius is located on the hemisphere that never faces Jupiter; therefore, an observer at the crater would never see Jupiter in the sky. (Note: For moons in synchronous rotation, such as Ganymede, 0° longitude corresponds to the part of the surface that always faces Jupiter. Regions between 90° W and 270° W longitude never face the moon’s parent planet.)

== Morphology ==
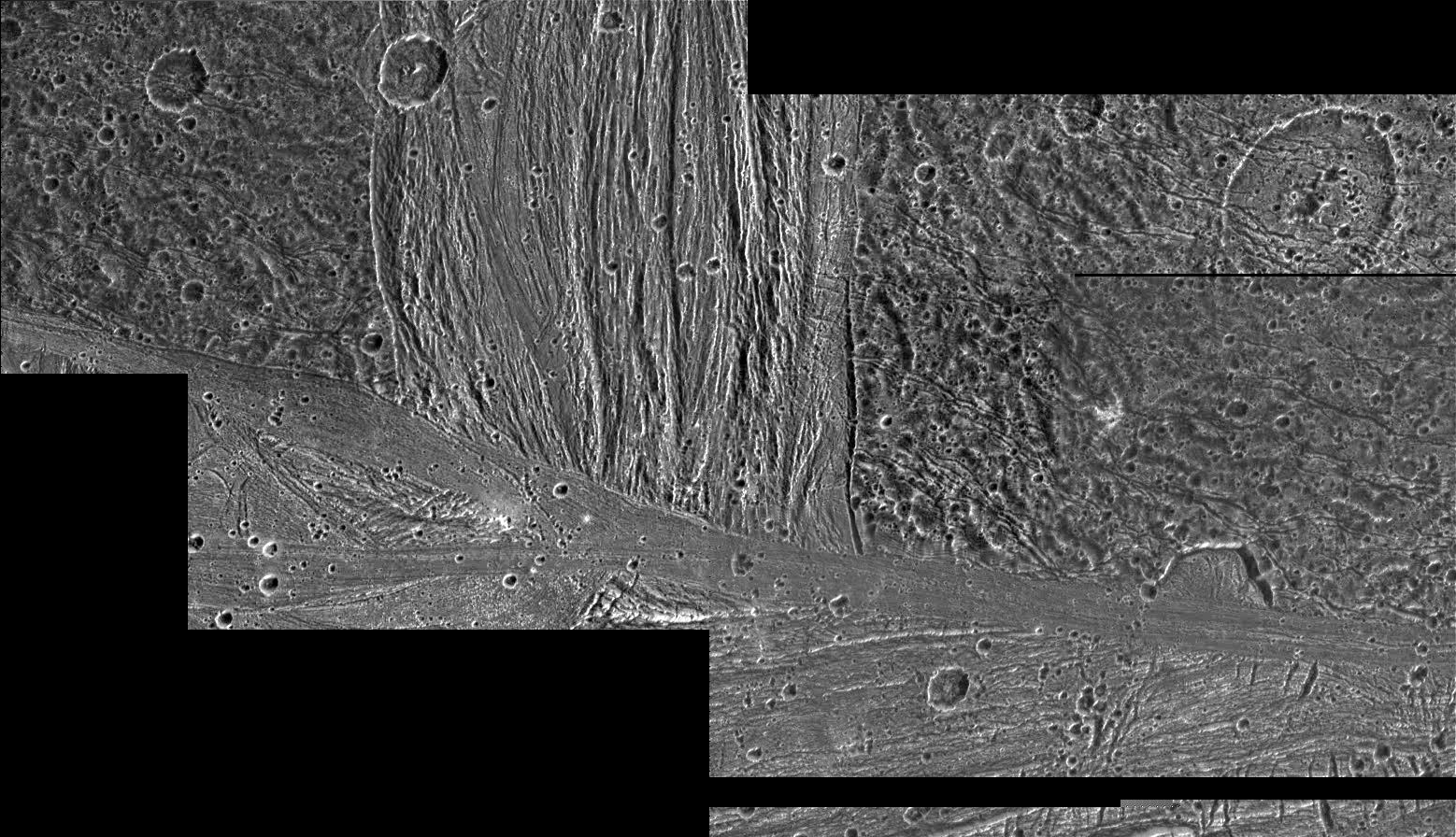
A mosaic image of the area where Erech Sulcus (center) and Sippar Sulcus (bottom) meet, taken by the Galileo space probe in May 1997. Erichthonius is located in the upper right of the image.

Erichthonius is a central-pit crater whose shape appears to have been geologically deformed and strained during its history. Several curvy grabens can be seen running across the crater from west to east, showing how the crater's floor and rim have been damaged by tectonic activity. Unlike many other strained or deformed craters on Ganymede, the faults within Erichthonius display graben morphology rather than tilt-block normal faulting. This indicates that extension within the crater floor occurred through the down-dropping of blocks between pairs of normal faults.

Analyses of the crater's floor show that it has experienced moderate extensional strain, with elongation estimated to be greater than 10%, consistent with extension along nearby subparallel ridges and troughs. While some of Ganymede's rift zones display extreme strains exceeding 100%, Erichthonius represents a more moderate example of tectonic stretching, preserving much of its original crater structure providing insight into the effects of ridge-and-trough fault zones on Ganymede's surface. Erichthonius is one of the least deformed strained craters, especially when compared to other examples such as Nefertum and Saltu.

== Geology ==
Erichthonius is classified as a pit crater. According to studies, craters on Ganymede tend to evolve into either dome craters or pit craters as a result of crater impact meltwater expanding as it freezes, relaxation of the moon's icy crust and other possible tectonic activity. However, domes usually only form if a crater has a diameter of more than 60 kilometres (37 mi).

== Exploration ==
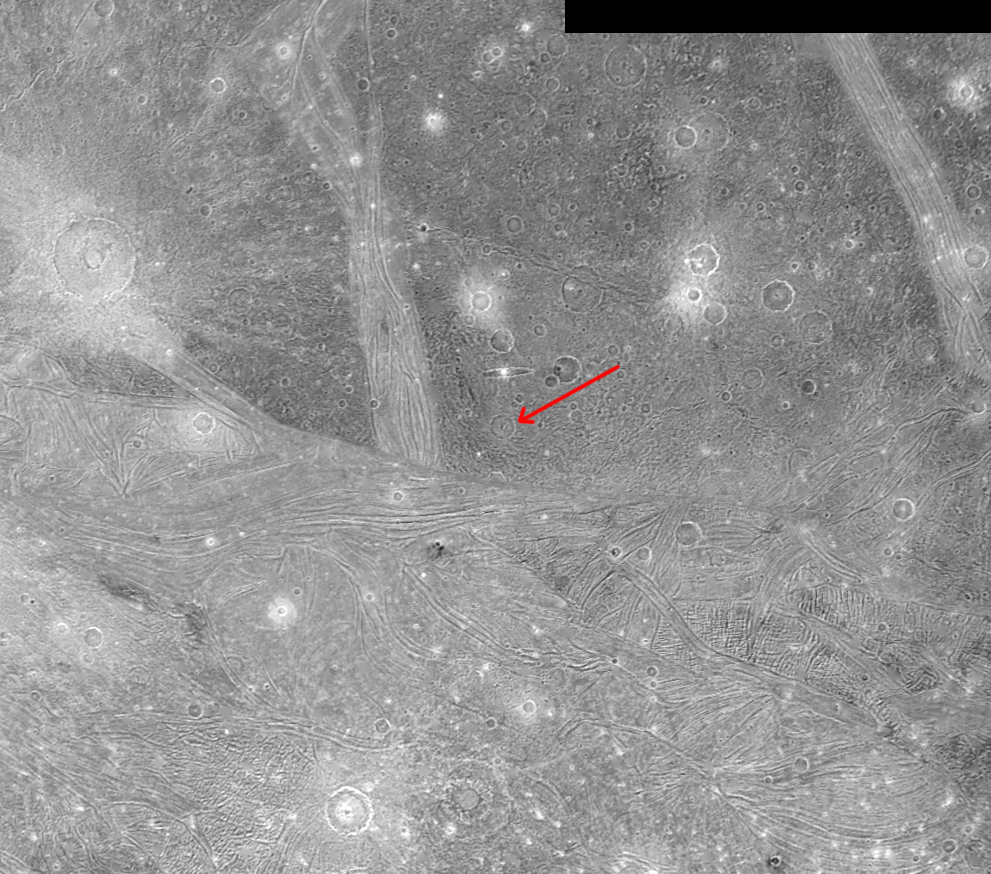
Erichthonius crater (marked by the red arrow), as imaged by Voyager 2 in July 1979. The bright ray crater to the left is Melkart.

Voyager 2 became the first spacecraft to image Erichthonius during its flyby of Jupiter and Ganymede in July 1979. The probe was able to image most of Marius Regio and the areas surrounding Erichthonius, but the crater was too small and Voyager was not close enough to capture its details.

Voyager 1, on the other hand, flew by Ganymede at the opposite hemisphere of the moon, meaning it was not able to image Erichthonius at all.

Galileo became the next, and as of 2025, the last spacecraft to explore Erichthonius. It conducted a targeted flyby of the crater in May 1997, providing close-up views. Galileo revealed that the crater floor was fractured and deformed by several grabens and cliffs, strongly indicating tectonic activity .

=== Future missions ===
The European Space Agency's (ESA) Jupiter Icy Moons Explorer (Juice) orbiter is scheduled to arrive at Jupiter in July 2031. After orbiting around Jupiter and performing multiple flybys of Europa, Callisto and Ganymede for three and a half years, Juice will settle into a low polar orbit around Ganymede, allowing it to capture higher-resolution images of the crater, which may help planetary scientists determine the causes of its deformation.

== See also ==
- List of craters on Ganymede
- Meteor
