= Achelous (crater) =

Impact crater on Ganymede

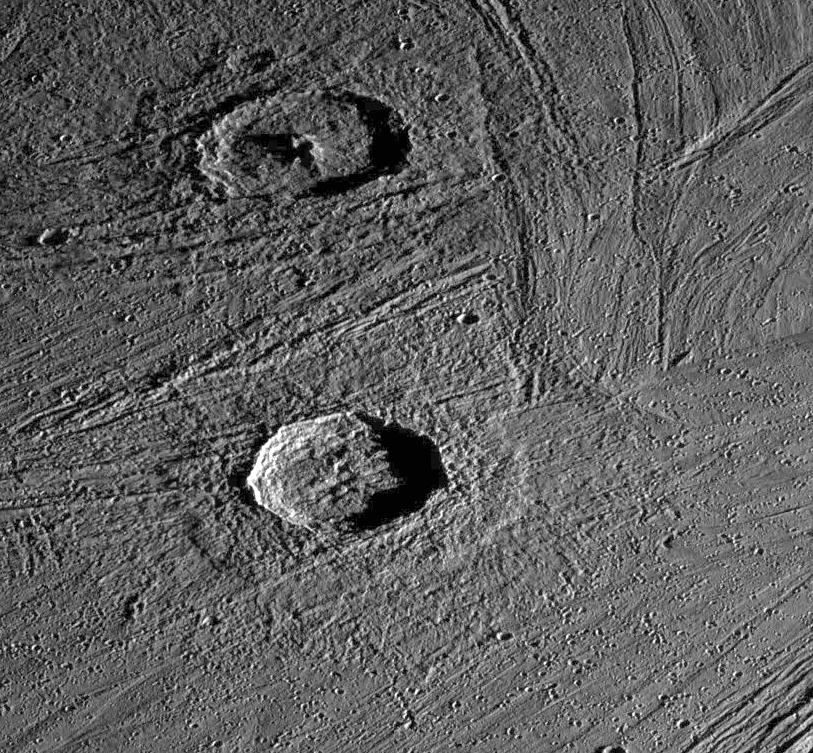
- The craters Gula (top) and Achelous (bottom), as imaged by the Galileo space probe on 5 April 1997.
- Feature type: Bright ray crater
- Coordinates: 61.90°N 11.78°W
- Diameter: 35.0 kilometres (21.7 mi)
- Eponym: Achelous

Achelous (/ˌækɪˈloʊ.əs/) is a relatively young impact crater with bright impact rays on Jupiter's largest moon Ganymede. Located near the similarly sized Gula, both craters are surrounded by a distinct raised pedestal formed from ejecta blasted out by their formative impact events.

== Naming ==
Achelous is named after Achelous, a river god in Greek mythology. According to Pseudo-Apollodorus and some myths, he was the father of Callirhoe, who was the mother of the Trojan prince Ganymede, with the name being adopted by the International Astronomical Union (IAU) in 1979.

Surface features on Ganymede are named after deities, heroes, and places drawn from either Ancient Middle Eastern mythologies or Greek mythology associated with the mythical figure Ganymede and his home kingdom, Troy. Achelous belongs to the latter category.

== Location ==
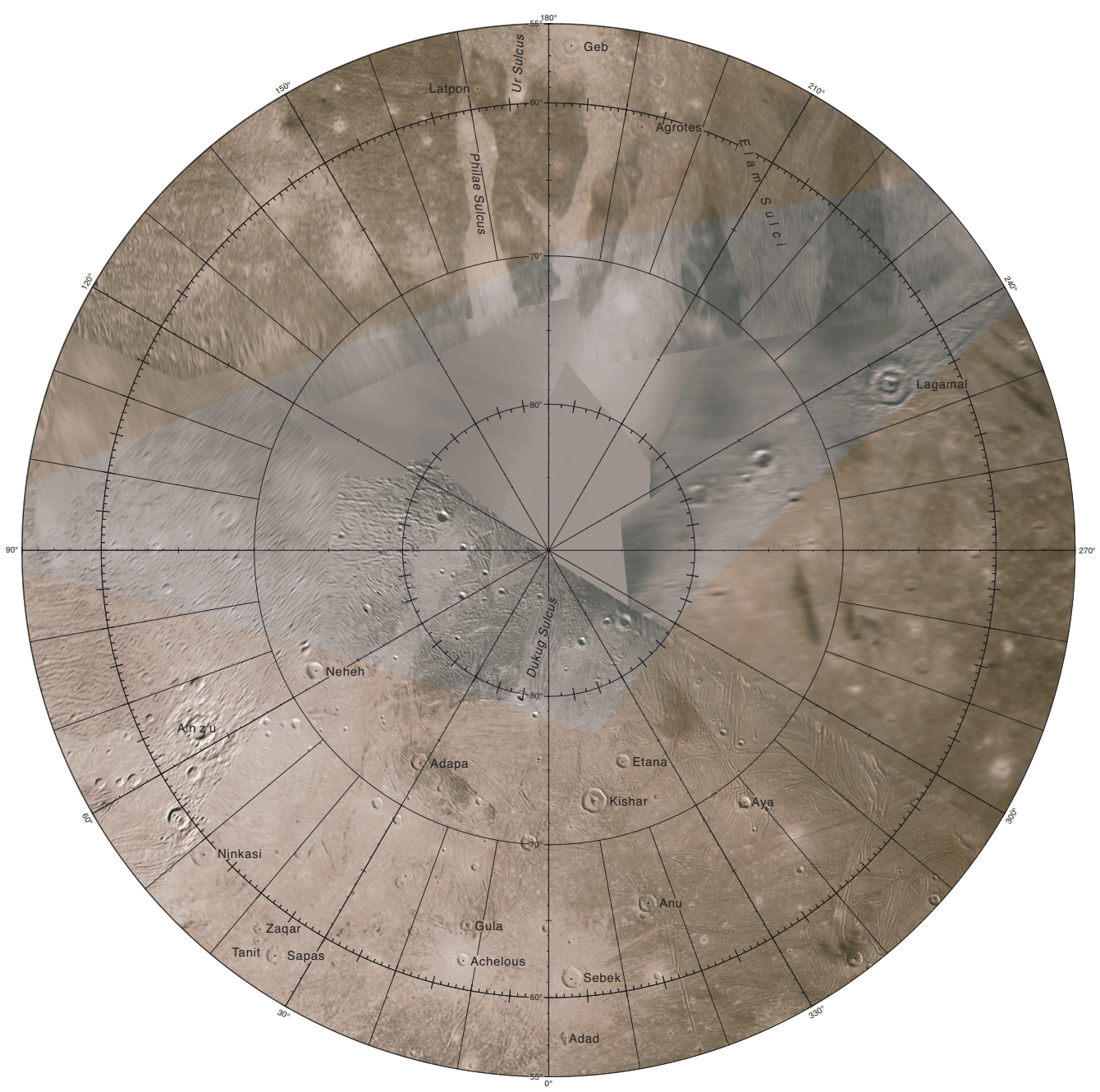
A map of Ganymede's northern polar region, showing Achelous near the bottom of the circular map.

Achelous is located at 61.90°N, 11.78°W on Ganymede's sub-Jovian hemisphere (i.e. the side of Ganymede that always faces Jupiter), about two-thirds of the way from the equator to the north pole.

Achelous is located north of Aquarius Sulcus and is surrounded by several other impact craters. To the north of Achelous is another major crater called Gula, while to the east lies the crater Sebek. To the southeast is the oval-shaped crater Adad.

It is located within the Perrine quadrangle of Ganymede (designated Jg2), in the northeastern corner of the quadrangle.

Since Achelous is located on the hemisphere of Ganymede that always faces Jupiter due to the moon's tidal locking to its parent planet, an observer at Achelous would always see Jupiter fixed in the same position in the sky. (Note: For moons in synchronous rotation, such as Ganymede, 0° longitude corresponds to the part of the surface that always faces Jupiter. Regions between 90° W to 0° to 270° W longitude always face the moon's parent planet.)

== Geological characteristics ==
Achelous is an impact crater roughly 35 kilometres (22 mi) in diameter and polygonal in shape. Rather than being perfectly round, its crater rim consists of seven straight segments. It is located within Ganymede's bright grooved terrain, with the surrounding grooves aligned in a northeast–southwest direction. The grooves appear to have influenced the shape of Achelous's rim, so that two of its seven rim segments are aligned in the direction of the grooves; the other five rim segments are oriented roughly 45° from the grooves. In contrast to Gula, Achelous lacks a central peak, though its center may be occupied by a collapsed central peak or a central pit.

Achelous's surrounding ejecta appears to have a distinct inner and outer layer. The inner raised pedestal extends approximately 17 kilometres (11 mi) from its crater rim, hosting a hummocky texture near the rim. The pedestal completely covers most preexisting topographical features, as only the most prominent grooves from the surrounding terrain extend into the pedestal. The outer thinner layer of ejecta does not obscure the underlying grooves as heavily and is overall smoother than the pedestal. Beyond these two ejecta layers is a system of radially extending secondary craters and crater chains. Most of these secondary craters are 1–2 km (0.62–1.24 mi) in diameter, with the largest observed secondary crater being 2.7 km (1.7 mi) in diameter.

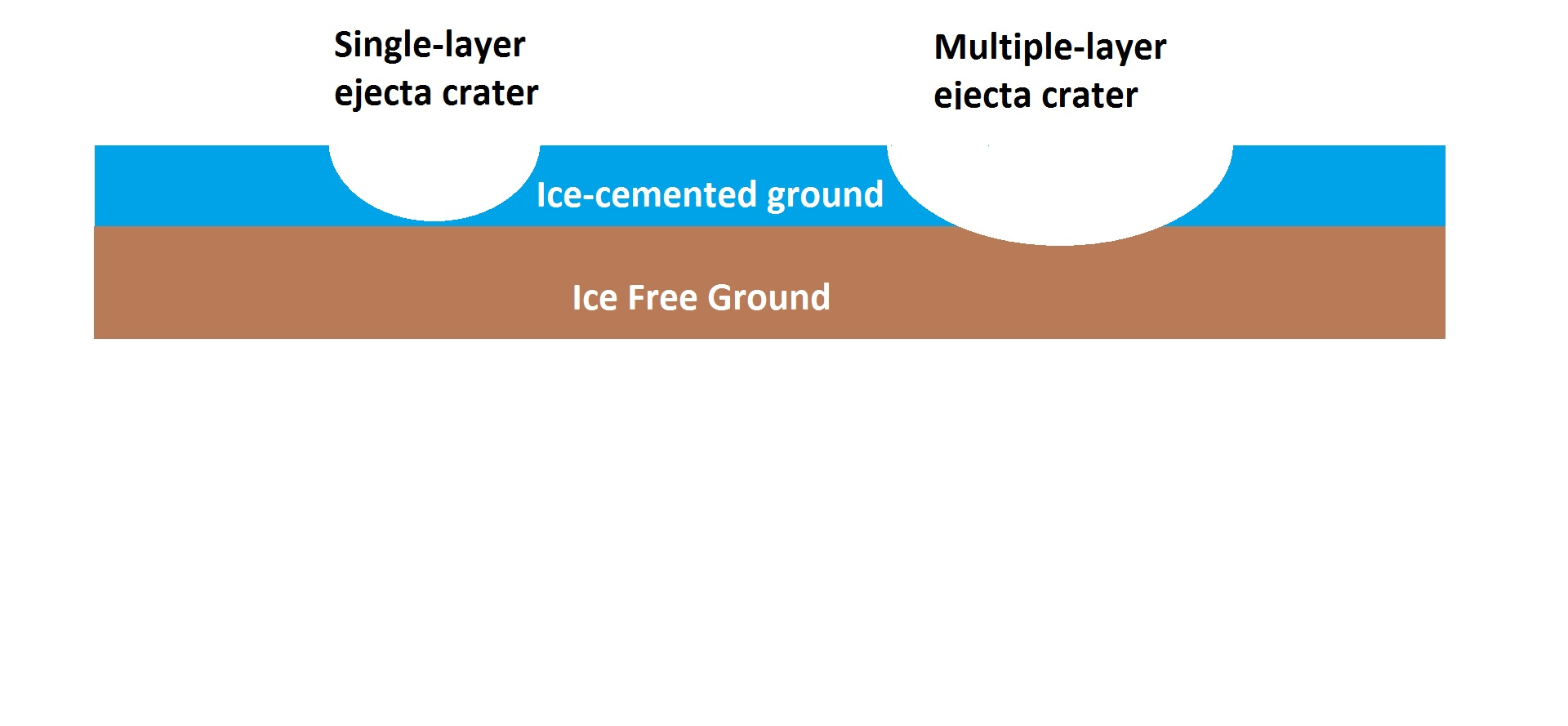
A cross-sectional diagram of how single-layer ejecta and multiple-layered ejecta craters may form on Mars.

The double-layered structure of Achelous's ejecta is similar to double-layered ejecta craters on Mars. Martian double-layered ejecta craters are hypothesized to form either by volatile-rich subsurface material vaporizing on impact or from Mars's atmosphere suspending ejected material, fluidizing the impact ejecta. As Ganymede currently lacks a dense atmosphere, this suggests Achelous's ejecta layers were formed due to the presence of subsurface volatile material at the impact site.

The morphology of Achelous was initially compared to that of the pancake ejecta craters on Mars, leading to speculation that its ejecta deposits may have formed through similar processes involving liquid water. However, high-resolution images from the Galileo spacecraft show that the ejecta deposits are highly textured rather than smooth, providing no direct evidence that liquid water was involved in their formation. Instead, the ejecta are interpreted as resembling large, circular landslide deposits emplaced during the impact event.

Galileo images also show that Gula is approximately half as deep as Achelous, despite the two craters having similar diameters. This difference in depth may be related to Gula's prominent central peak, whereas Achelous lacks one. The absence of a central peak at Achelous suggests that floor uplift and collapse were less pronounced, resulting in a relatively deeper crater floor. The surrounding grooved terrain is also densely peppered with secondary impact craters ejected from both Achelous and Gula.

== Exploration ==
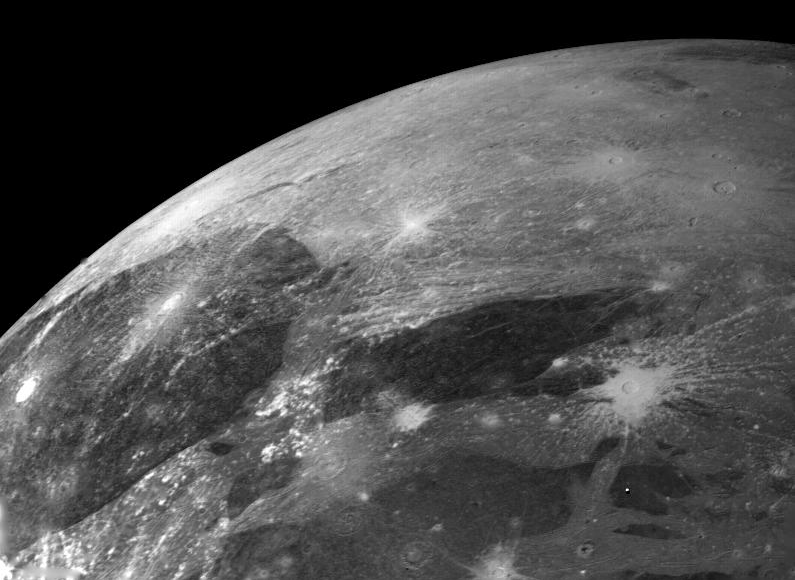
A narrow-angle image of Ganymede's northern hemisphere showing Achelous crater (located about halfway diagonally between the center and the upper right of the image). The image was acquired by Voyager 1 in March 1979.

Voyager 1 became the first spacecraft to observe and image Achelous during its flyby of Jupiter and its moons in March 1979. During the encounter, Voyager 1 imaged the Jupiter-facing hemisphere of Ganymede, where Achelous is located.

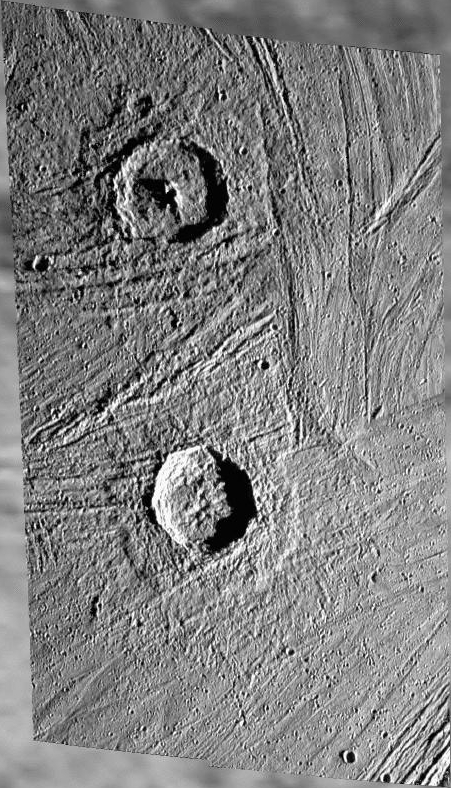
A top-down view of Gula and Achelous craters, as imaged by Galileo space probe in April 1997.

Achelous is one of only two bright-ray craters on Ganymede that the Galileo spacecraft managed to image at close range during its eight-year mission in orbit around Jupiter (the other being the crater Melkart). During the flyby, Galileo was able to resolve details within and around the crater as small as 180 m (590 ft) per pixel. Using Galileo's high resolution images, planetary scientists were able to correct their initial assumptions that Achelous is a smooth crater and found no direct evidence that liquid water was involved in the formation of its ejecta deposit. As of 2026, Galileo's images of Achelous are best available to date.

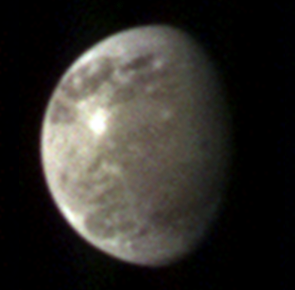
A distant image of Ganymede, taken by Cassini in December 2000. Achelous (upper left of the disk) is barely visible in this image.

The next spacecraft to image Achelous was Cassini. The spacecraft flew through the Jovian system to obtain a gravity assist on its way to Saturn. Because it passed Ganymede at a distance of 10,350,000 km (6,430,000 mi), Achelous is only barely visible in its images.

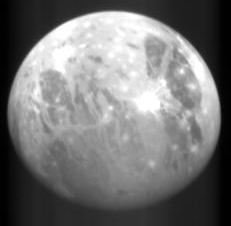
An image of Ganymede's Jupiter-facing side, taken by New Horizons' LORRI camera in February 2007. Achelous is visible near the right edge of Ganymede in this image.

New Horizons became the next spacecraft to image Achelous when it flew by the Jovian system in February 2007 to obtain a gravity assist on its way to Pluto. During the flyby, the spacecraft passed approximately 3,500,000 km (2,200,000 mi) from Ganymede, limiting the resolution of Achelous in the images it returned.

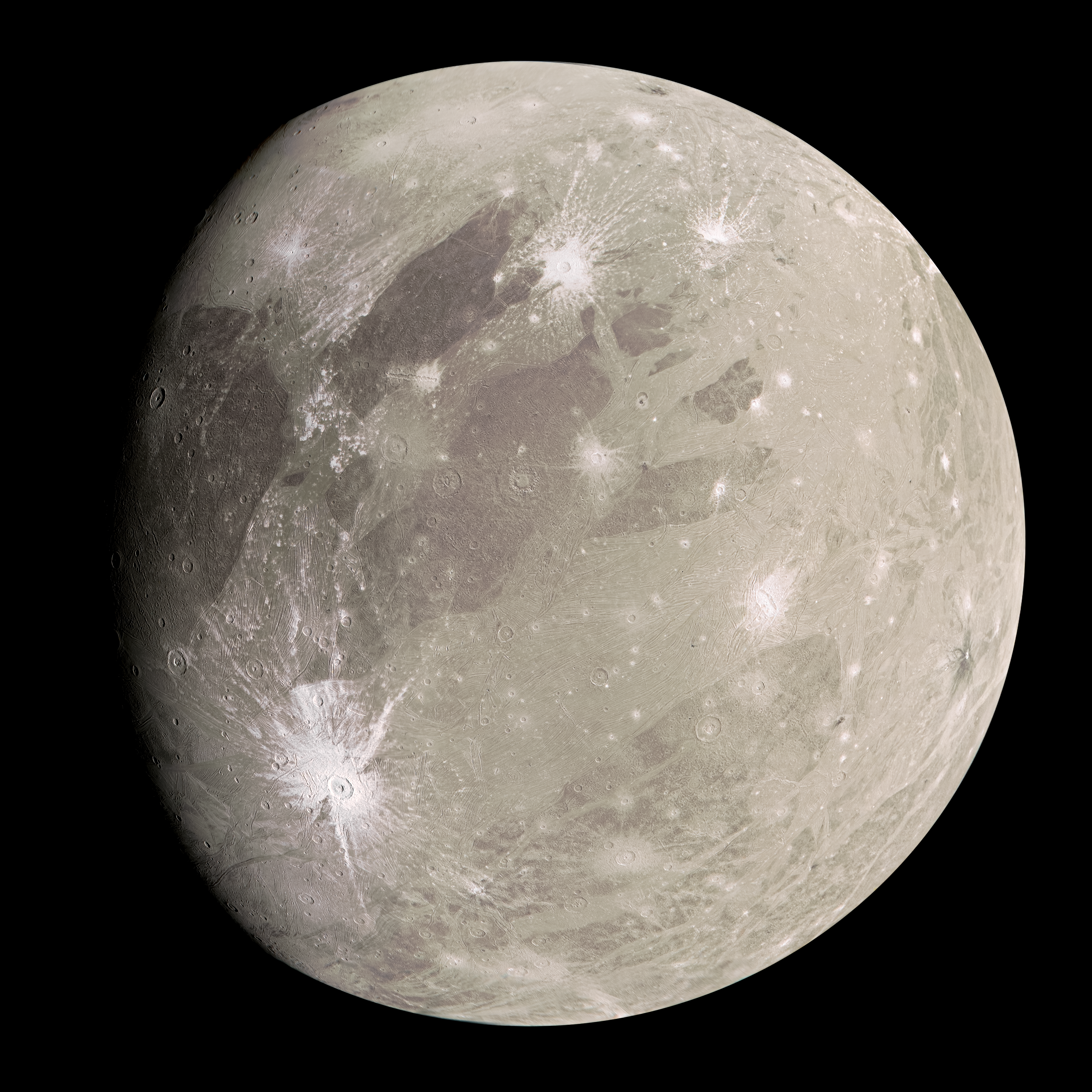
A true color image of Ganymede, taken by the Juno space probe in June 2021, showing Achelous crater in the upper regions of Ganymede, slightly to the right.

The most recent spacecraft to image Achelous was Juno, which performed a close flyby of Ganymede in June 2021 to reduce its orbital period around Jupiter. Achelous is prominently visible in Juno's images as a well-defined impact crater.

=== Future mission ===
The European Space Agency's (ESA) spacecraft called Jupiter Icy Moons Explorer (Juice) was launched in April 2023 and is now on its way to Jupiter and its icy moons. The spacecraft is expected to arrive at Jupiter in July 2031. After spending three and a half years conducting multiple flybys of Europa, Callisto, and Ganymede, Juice is expected to enter orbit around Ganymede in 2034 at an altitude of approximately 500 kilometres (310 mi). From this close distance, Juice is expected to obtain extremely high-resolution images of Ganymede, allowing scientists to study the morphology and formation of its numerous bright-ray craters, including Achelous, in far greater detail.

== See also ==
- List of craters on Ganymede
