= Natrun and Rum Paterae =

Surface depressions and possible ice volcanoes on Ganymede

Rum and Natrun Paterae
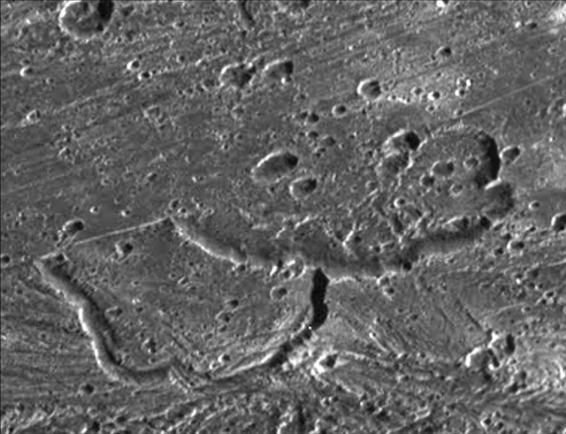
- An image of Natrun (left) and Rum Paterae (right), taken by the Galileo space probe on 7 May 1997.
- Feature type: Paterae
- Coordinates: 30.79°S 183.04°W (midpoint between the two paterae)
- Diameter: 37.5 km (23.3 mi) (Natrun Patera) 38 km (24 mi) (Rum Patera)
- Eponym: Wadi El Natrun and Wadi Rum

Natrun and Rum Paterae are a pair of surface depressions on Jupiter's largest moon Ganymede. These depressions consist of curvilinear and arcuate cliffs that resemble scalloped-shape lava flows. Both are considered as potential ground-level cryovolcano calderas.

== Naming ==
In accordance with the naming convention set by the International Astronomical Union (IAU), all paterae on Ganymede are named after wadis, desert river valleys that are usually completely dry and flow with water only during periods of heavy rainfall, that are located in the Middle East.

Natrun Patera is named after Wadi El Natrun in Egypt. This wadi hosts several historically important monasteries and is located near the site where Antoine de Saint-Exupéry's plane crashed. Saint-Exupéry survived the accident, which is often cited as an inspiration for his story The Little Prince.

Rum Patera is named after a river valley in southern Jordan called Wadi Rum. It is famous for its prehistoric petroglyphs that Neolithic people left behind thousands of years ago, and it is currently an active archeological site.

Both names were approved by the IAU in March 2015.

== Location ==
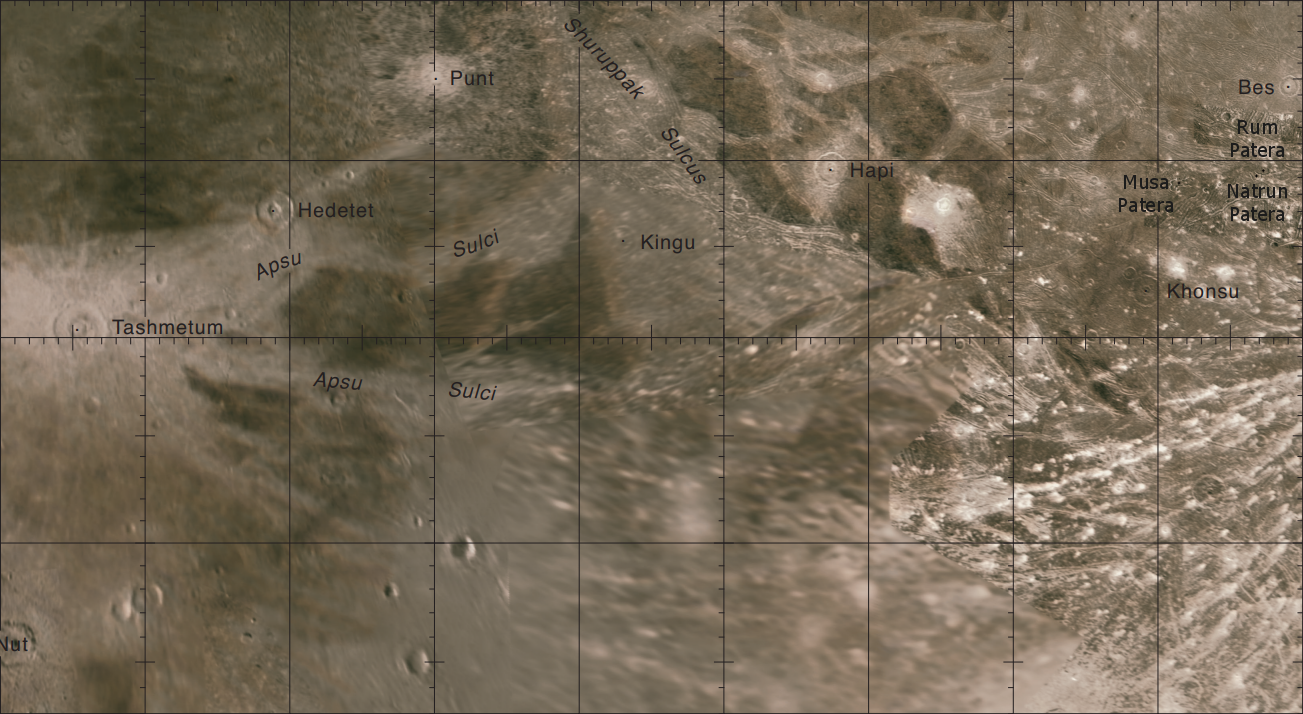
A map of the Apsu Sulci quadrangle, showing Natrun and Rum Patera on the eastern edge of the map.

Natrun and Rum Paterae are located in Ganymede's southern hemisphere, between two bright grooved-terrain regions on the moon called Sippar Sulcus and Mummu Sulcus. To the paterae's north is the crater Bes, while to the east lies the prominent and very bright ray crater Osiris.

To the southwest is another patera called Musa Patera, which is also a potential cryovolcanic caldera.

Both Natrun and Rum Paterae are situated within the Apsu Sulci quadrangle (or section) of Ganymede (designated Jg13).

Due to Ganymede’s synchronous rotation as it orbits around Jupiter, one hemisphere of the moon always faces its parent planet while the opposite hemisphere never does. Natrun and Rum Paterae are located on the hemisphere that never faces Jupiter; thus, an observer at either Natrun or Rum Patera would never see Jupiter in the sky. (Note: For moons in synchronous rotation, such as Ganymede, 0° longitude corresponds to the part of the surface that always faces Jupiter. Regions between 90° W and 270° W longitude never face the moon's parent planet.)

== Potential Cryovolcanism ==
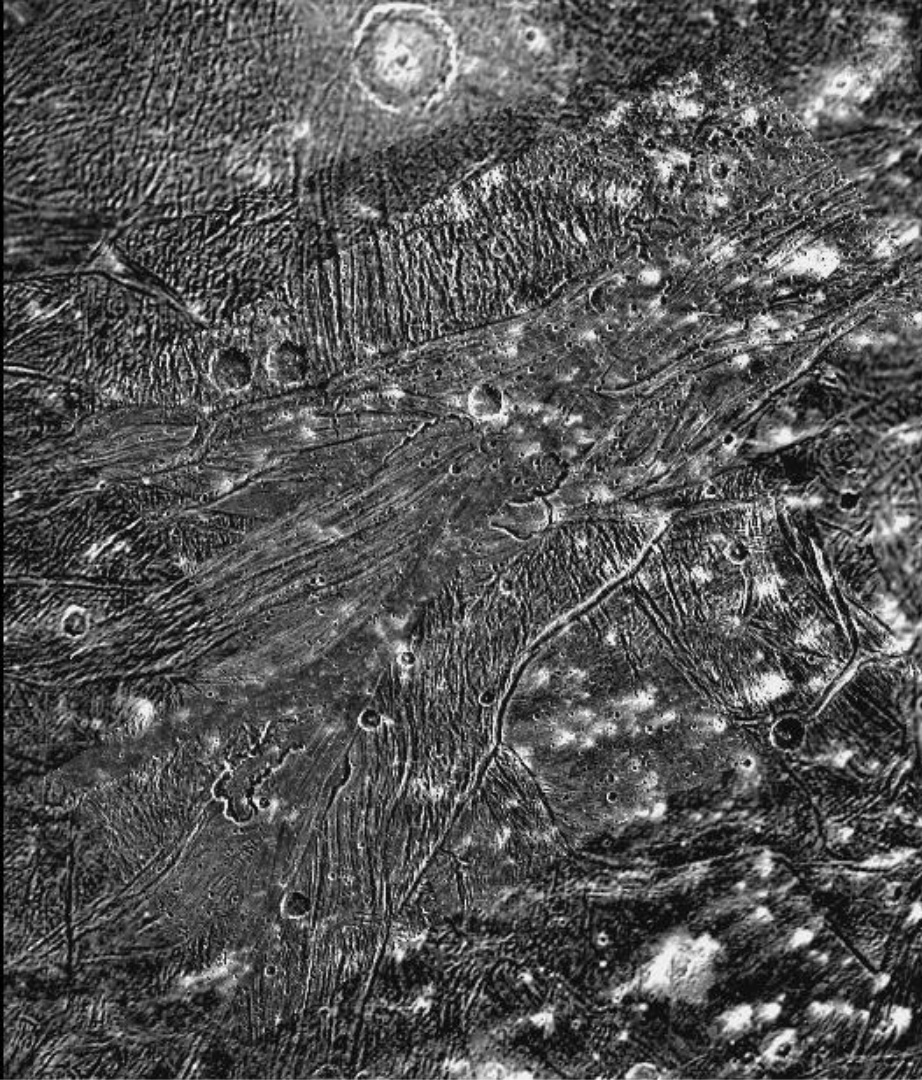
An image of Sippar Sulcus, showing Natrun and Rum Paterae slightly to the right of center. This image was taken by the Galileo spacecraft in May 1997. The crater at the top is Bes.

Preliminary analyses indicate that Natrun and Rum Paterae may be ground-level cryovolcanic calderas on Ganymede. Their open rims, together with their scalloped-like lobate shapes and irregular margins, suggest that slushy material—analogous to molten lava on Earth—once flowed across the area. On Ganymede, however, such flows would have consisted of slushy water ice rather than basaltic lava.

As of 2026, however, the cryovolcanic origin of paterae on Ganymede remains uncertain. Alternative processes, including mass wasting and fracturing, may also have played a role in shaping these features. Higher-resolution imaging and detailed spectroscopic observations will be necessary to determine conclusively whether Ganymede's paterae are cryovolcanic in origin.

== Exploration ==
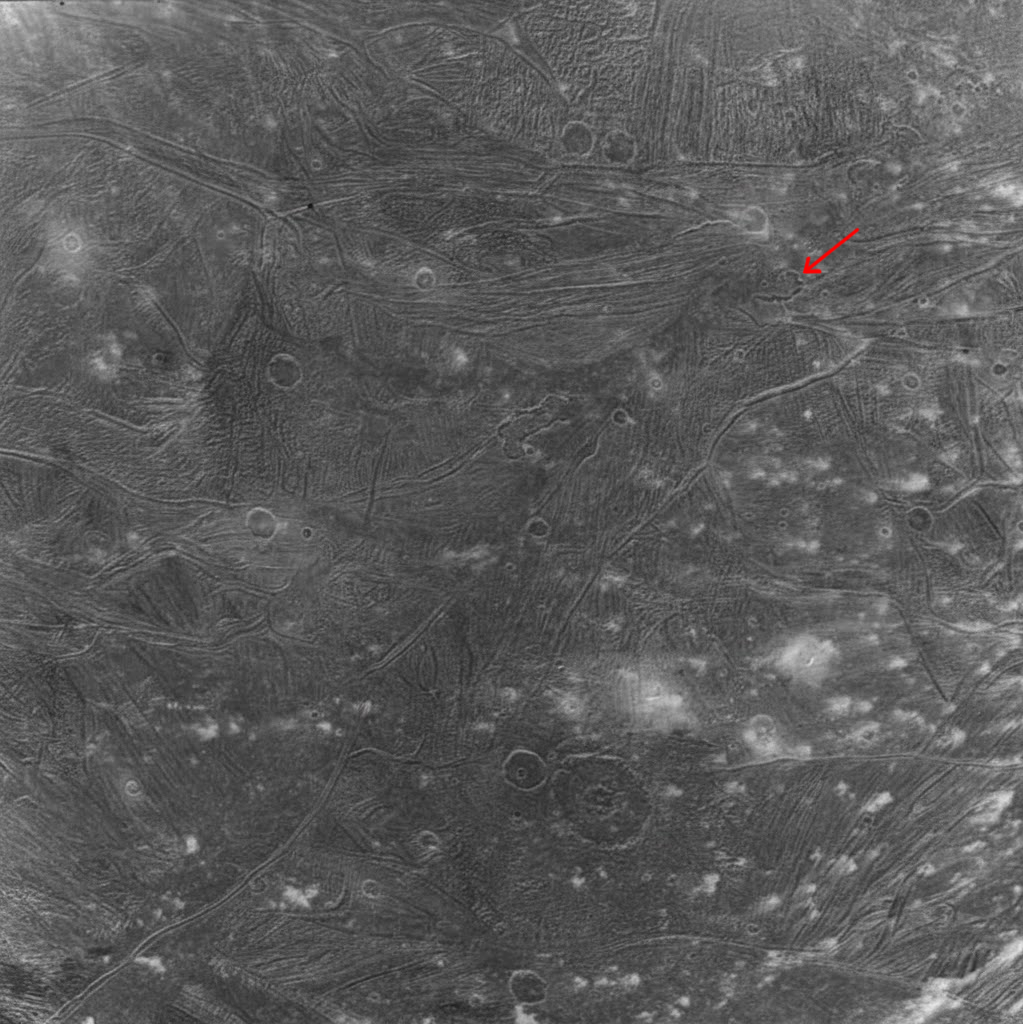
A narrow angle image of Natrun and Rum Paterae (pointed with the red arrow), imaged by Voyager 2 in July 1979. Musa Patera is at the center of the image.

Voyager 2 was the first spacecraft to properly explore the hemisphere of Ganymede that never faces Jupiter. During its flyby of Ganymede in July 1979, the probe captured images of both paterae. Although the paterae were readily discernible in the images, their small size and the spacecraft's distance prevented clear resolution of surface details.

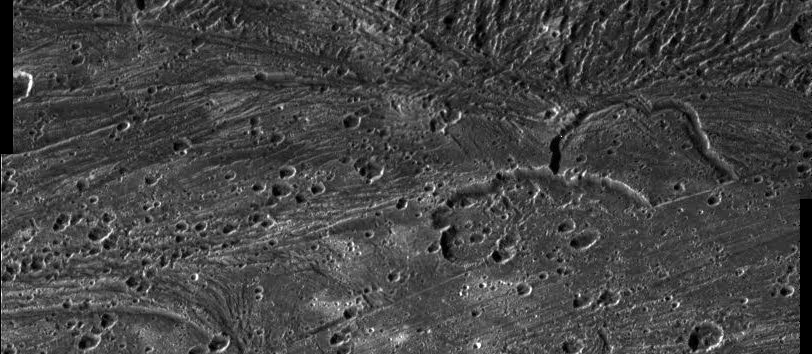
A mosaic image of Natrun and Rum Paterae and their surrounding areas, taken by Galileo in May 1997.

Galileo was the first space probe to provide high-quality images of Natrun and Rum Paterae as it orbited Jupiter between December 1995 and September 2003. In May 1997, during its G8 flyby of Ganymede, Galileo was able to resolve details as small as 180 m (590 ft) per pixel in its images.

=== Future Missions ===
The European Space Agency's (ESA) Jupiter Icy Moons Explorer (Juice) spacecraft is currently en route to Jupiter. It is scheduled to arrive in July 2031, and in 2034, Juice is expected to enter a low orbit around Ganymede at an altitude of approximately 500 kilometres (310 mi), following about three and a half years in orbit around Jupiter. Natrun and Rum Paterae are considered high-priority targets for Juice, as high-resolution imaging of these features may help resolve the long-standing question of whether cryovolcanoes exist on Ganymede.

== See also ==
- List of geological features on Ganymede
- Musa Patera - another potential cryovolcano on Ganymede
