= Amset (crater) =

Crater on Ganymede

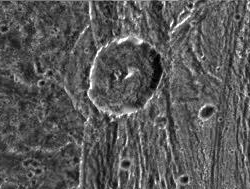
- An image of Amset crater, taken by the Galileo space probe on 7 May 1997
- Feature type: Central Peak Crater
- Coordinates: 14.41°S 178.75°W
- Diameter: 11 kilometres (6.8 mi)
- Eponym: Imsety (also called Amset)

Amset is a small crater located a few kilometers south of the equator of Jupiter's largest moon Ganymede. It has a central peak at its center, while the crater itself has a diameter of only approximately 11 kilometres (6.8 mi). Amset crater is superimposed on both ancient and younger surface features on Ganymede, strongly suggesting that it's a recent crater.

== Naming ==
Amset is named after an ancient Egyptian god named Imsety (Amset is an alternative transliteration). He is one of the four Egyptian gods who personify and protect the four canopic jars, special containers used by Ancient Egyptians to hold and preserve the organs of a dead person after they had been removed from the body. Imsety also holds the title "Son of Horus", just like his three siblings. Imsety specifically protects the liver of the deceased person's mummy.

The crater's name follows the International Astronomical Union's (IAU) convention of naming craters on Ganymede after deities, heroes, and places from Ancient Near Eastern mythologies. The IAU approved the name for Amset in 1997 since he belongs to Egyptian mythology.

== Geography and location ==
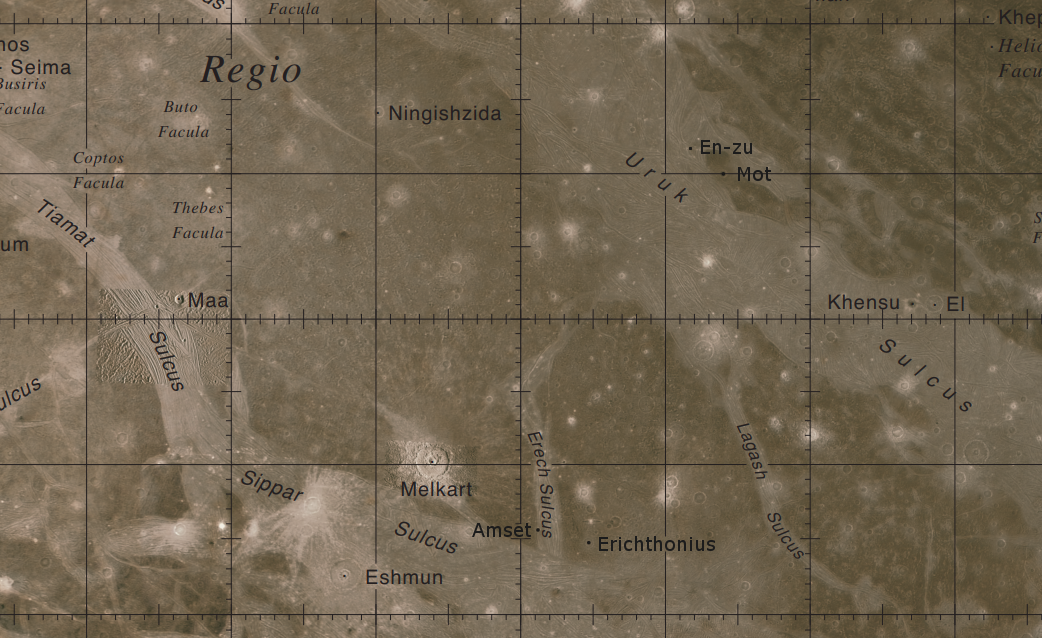
A map of the Uruk Sulcus quadrangle on Ganymede. Amset is the tiny, barely visible crater in the south.

Amset is located just a few kilometers south of Ganymede's equator, within the southern section of a dark, ancient region on Ganymede called Marius Regio.

The crater sits near the junction of two younger, grooved terrains on Ganymede, called Erech Sulcus and Sippar Sulcus. It is located on the western side of Erech Sulcus.

To the east of Amset lie Erech Sulcus and the strained crater Erichthonius, while to its southwest is the crater Eshmun; to its south is Sippar Sulcus, while to its east lies the major ray crater Melkart.

Amset is located within the Uruk Sulcus quadrangle (or section) of Ganymede (designated Jg8). Ganymede is in synchronous rotation with Jupiter, meaning one hemisphere of the moon always faces its parent planet, while the opposite hemisphere never does. Amset is located on the hemisphere that never faces Jupiter; therefore, an observer at the crater would never see Jupiter in the sky. (Note: For moons in synchronous rotation, such as Ganymede, 0° longitude corresponds to the part of the surface that always faces Jupiter. Regions between 90° W and 270° W longitude never face the moon's parent planet.)

== Natural History and morphology ==
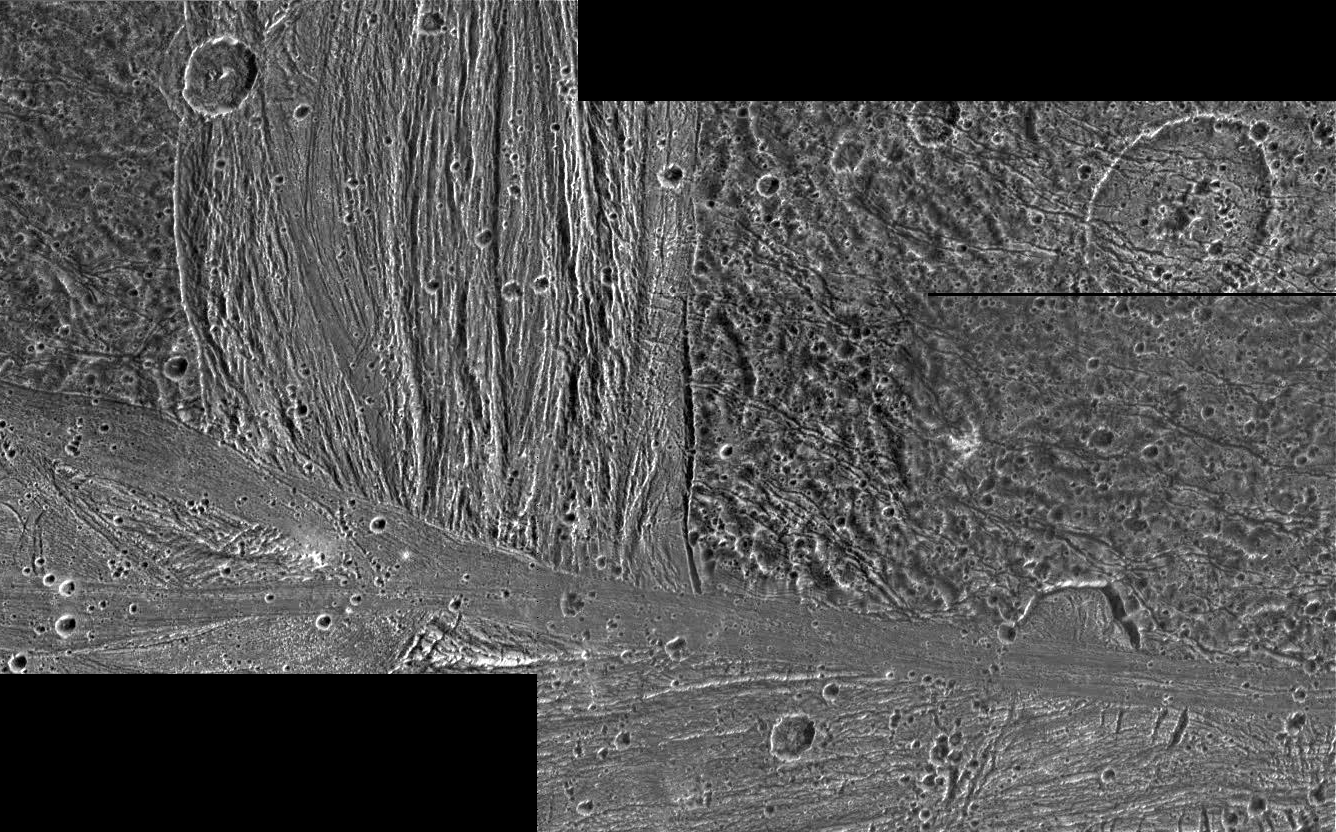
A mosaic image of the area where Erech Sulcus (center) and Sippar Sulcus (bottom) meet, taken by the Galileo space probe in May 1997. Amset is the prominent crater in the upper left of the image.

The solid, icy surface of Ganymede is pockmarked with numerous craters. Amset is a typical example of such a crater.

Amset is superimposed on both the older, rugged terrain of Marius Regio and the younger, smoother, grooved terrain of Erech Sulcus, strongly suggesting that it is younger than both surface features.

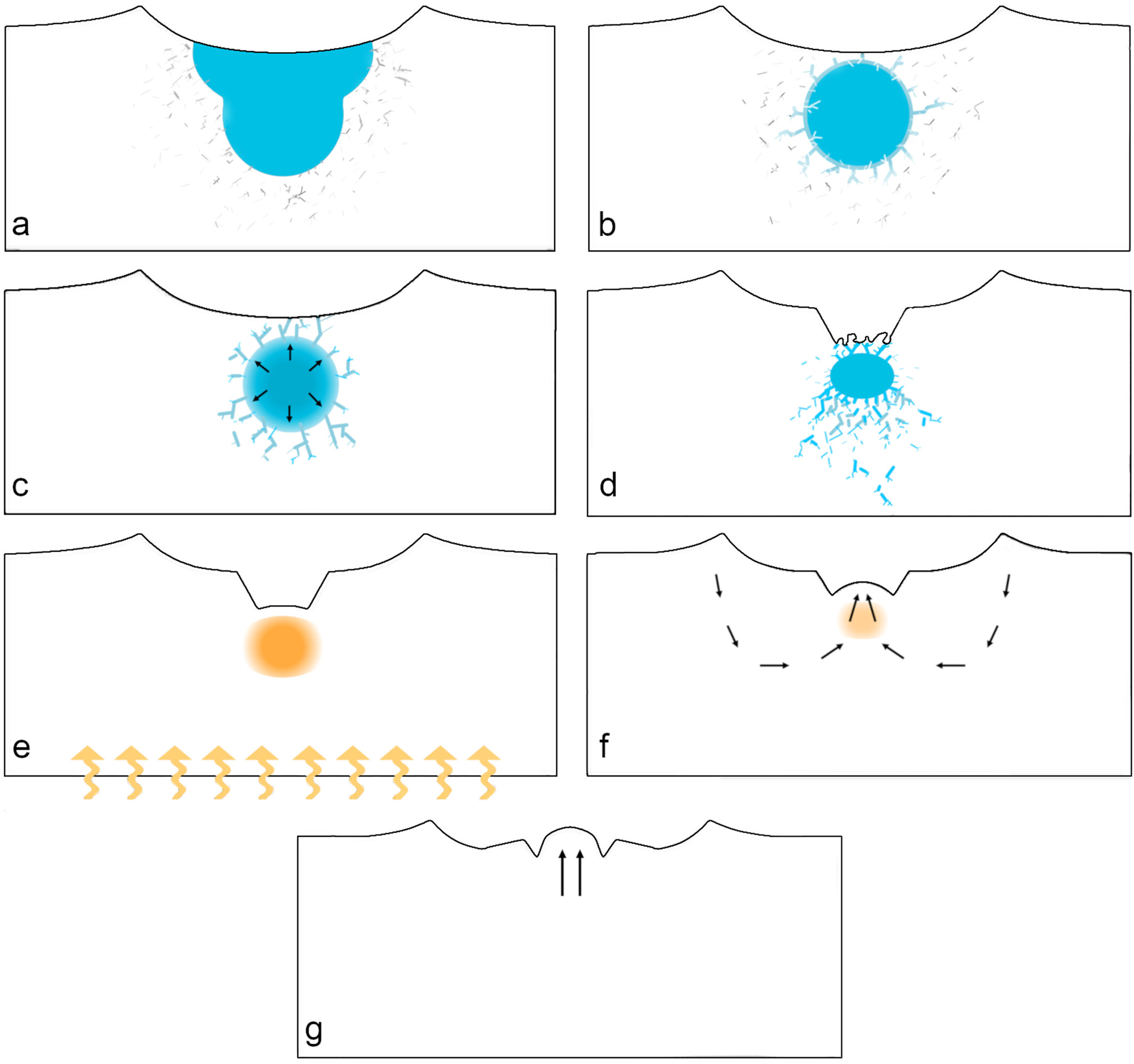
A diagram illustrating the formation of dome craters on icy moons. It shows how the refreezing of meltwater from meteorite impacts can create sinkholes, forming pit craters, and how the subsequent expansion of the freezing meltwater pushes up the crater floor to form an icy dome.

Amset also features a central peak, similar to those found in craters on rocky bodies such as the Earth's Moon. However, unlike the Earth's rocky Moon, Ganymede's surface is composed primarily of ice. As a result, central peaks on the two moons form through different processes. Central peaks in lunar craters are created when the Moon's surface rebounds upward after a powerful meteorite impact. The intense heat generated by the impact melts part of the rocky crust, causing the surface to rise and form a central peak.

For Ganymede, however, central peaks form when meltwater accumulates beneath the crater floor as a result of the intense heat generated by a meteorite impact. Over time, the meltwater refreezes, and because water expands as it freezes, the center of the crater cracks and gradually balloons upward, eventually forming a central peak. Central-peak craters can potentially turn into dome craters as more time passes. However, according to research and surveys, only craters wider than 60 kilometres (37 mi) can undergo such a process.

== Exploration ==
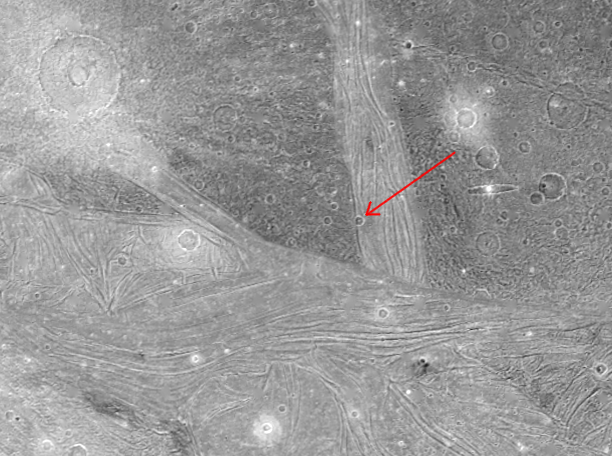
Amset crater (indicated by the red arrow) as seen by Voyager 2 during its flyby of Ganymede in July 1979. The large, bright crater in the upper left is Melkart.

Amset is a very small crater, which makes it difficult to observe, especially from afar. Voyager 2 became the first spacecraft to image Amset during its flyby of Ganymede in July 1979. Despite the relatively high resolution of its imagery, Amset appeared as a mere 12x12-pixel feature in the probe's images.

The only probe to have imaged Amset clearly was Galileo, when it flew over the side of Ganymede that never faces Jupiter in May 1997. Fortuitously, Amset was photographed when Galileo was closest to Ganymede during its brief flyby, allowing planetary scientists to observe the crater in great detail despite it being only 11 kilometres (6.8 mi) wide.

=== Future missions ===
The European Space Agency's (ESA) Jupiter Icy Moons Explorer (Juice) orbiter is scheduled to arrive at Jupiter in July 2031. After orbiting around Jupiter and performing multiple flybys of Europa, Callisto and Ganymede for three and a half years, Juice will settle into a low polar orbit around Ganymede. Its orbit around Ganymede could potentially allow planetary scientists to observe Amset at a resolution never achieved before.

== See also ==
- List of craters on Ganymede
- Meteor
