= Gula (crater) =

Impact crater on Ganymede

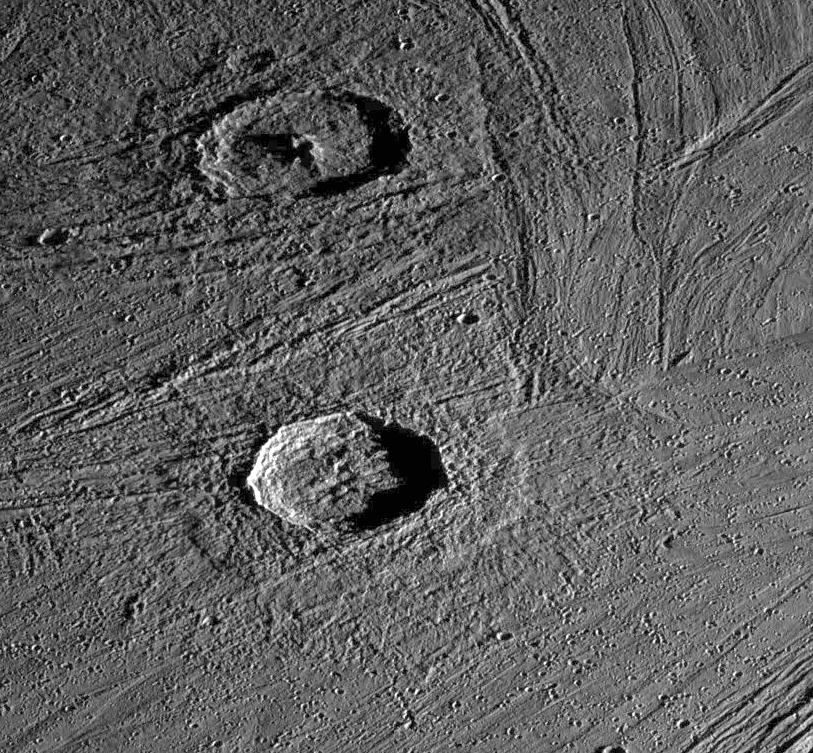
- Craters Gula (top) and Achelous (bottom)
- Feature type: Impact crater
- Coordinates: 64.15°N 12.30°W
- Diameter: 38 kilometres (24 mi)
- Eponym: Gula

Gula is a pedestal impact crater on Jupiter's moon Ganymede. Located immediately to the north of the similarly sized Achelous, both craters are surrounded by a thick ring of impact ejecta blasted out by their respective impact events. Gula is named after the Mesopotamian goddess of medicine Gula, with the name being adopted by the International Astronomical Union (IAU) in 1979.

== Geology ==
Gula is roughly 38 kilometres (24 mi) in diameter and hosts a central peak. Its crater rim is mostly circular, although it has two straight rim segments. Like Achelous, Gula is located in a region of one of Ganymede's grooved terrains, with the surrounding grooves oriented in a northeast–southwest direction. It is located north of Aquarius Sulcus and is about two-thirds of the way about two-thirds of the way from Ganymede's equator to its north pole. Gula located within the Perrine quadrangle of Ganymede (designated Jg2).

One of Gula's linear crater rim segments is aligned parallel to the surrounding grooves. Compared to Achelous, Gula is older and more degraded, with its floor hosting several small craters. Additionally, the eastern and possibly southern flanks of its ejecta blanket appear to be interrupted by tectonic grooves.
