= Musa Patera =

Surface depression and possible ice volcano on Ganymede

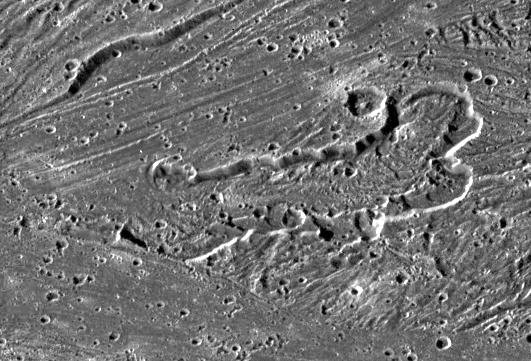
- An image of Musa Patera, taken by the Galileo space probe on May 7, 1997. North is at the bottom of the image.
- Feature type: Patera
- Coordinates: 31.35°S 188.46°W
- Diameter: 69 km (43 mi)
- Eponym: Wadi Musa

Musa Patera is a surface depression on Ganymede, the largest moon of Jupiter. The 69 km (43 mi)–wide depression consists of curvilinear and arcuate cliffs and, based on studies of its structure, is considered a potential cryovolcano caldera.

== Naming ==
Musa Patera is named after a wadi in the modern country of Jordan, near the famous archaeological site of Petra. Wadis are desert river valleys that are usually dry and flow with water only during periods of heavy rainfall.

The International Astronomical Union's (IAU) chose the name in line with the convention that states that paterae on Ganymede should be named after wadi river valleys in the Middle East, a region that includes Jordan. The name was approved by the IAU in 2015.

== Location ==
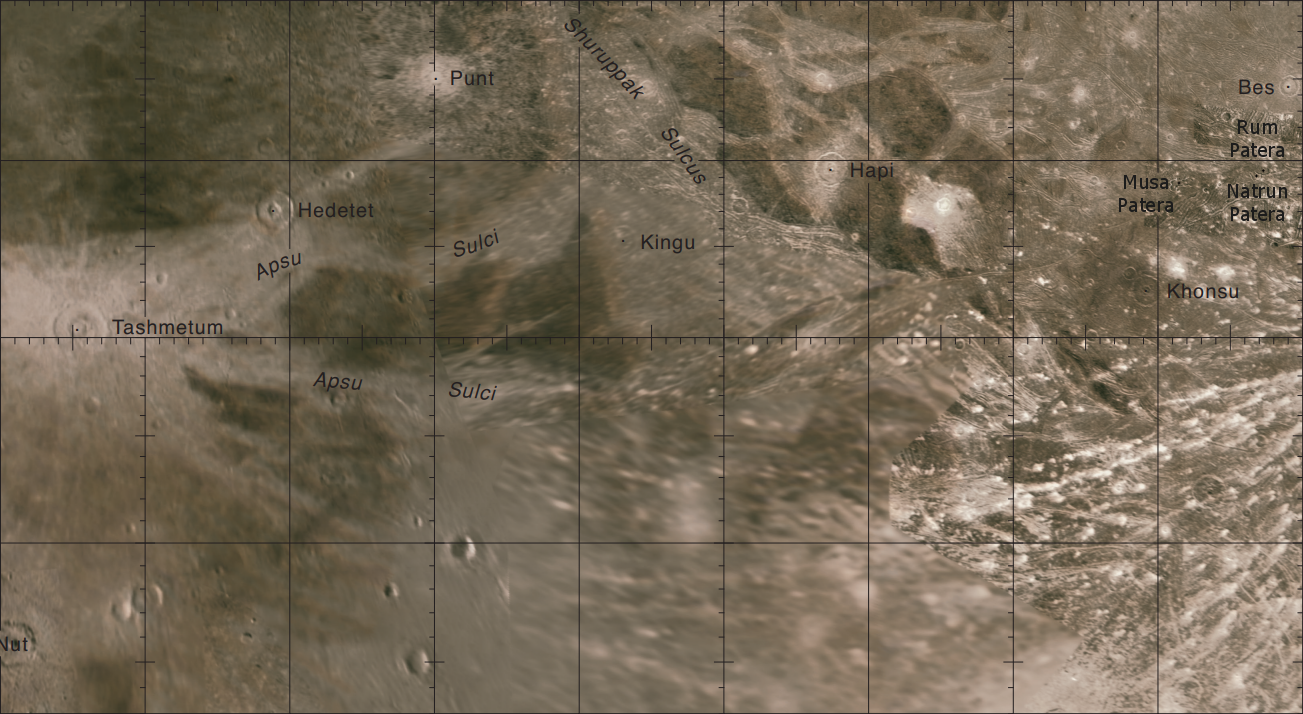
A map of the Apsu Sulci quadrangle. Musa Patera is on the eastern side of the map.

Musa Patera is located in the southern hemisphere of Ganymede, near the boundary between two bright grooved-terrain regions on the moon, Sippar Sulcus and Mummu Sulcus. The patera lies to the northwest of the bright and prominent ray crater Osiris. To the east of Musa Patera are two other paterae, Rum Patera and Natrun Patera, while to its northeast lies the crater Bes. To the south of the patera is the crater Khonsu.

Musa Patera is located within the Apsu quadrangle (or section) of Ganymede (designated Jg13). The maps of Ganymede published by the United States Geological Survey (USGS) classify Musa Patera as part of Mummu Sulcus, whereas articles by NASA and the Jet Propulsion Laboratory (JPL) consider the patera to be part of Sippar Sulcus.

Due to Ganymede’s synchronous rotation as it orbits Jupiter, one side of the moon always faces its parent planet while the opposite side never does. Musa Patera is located on the hemisphere that never faces Jupiter; therefore, an observer at Musa Patera would never see Jupiter in the sky. (Note: For moons in synchronous rotation, such as Ganymede, 0° longitude corresponds to the part of the surface that always faces Jupiter. Regions between 90° W and 270° W longitude never face the moon's parent planet.)

== Potential Cryovolcanism ==
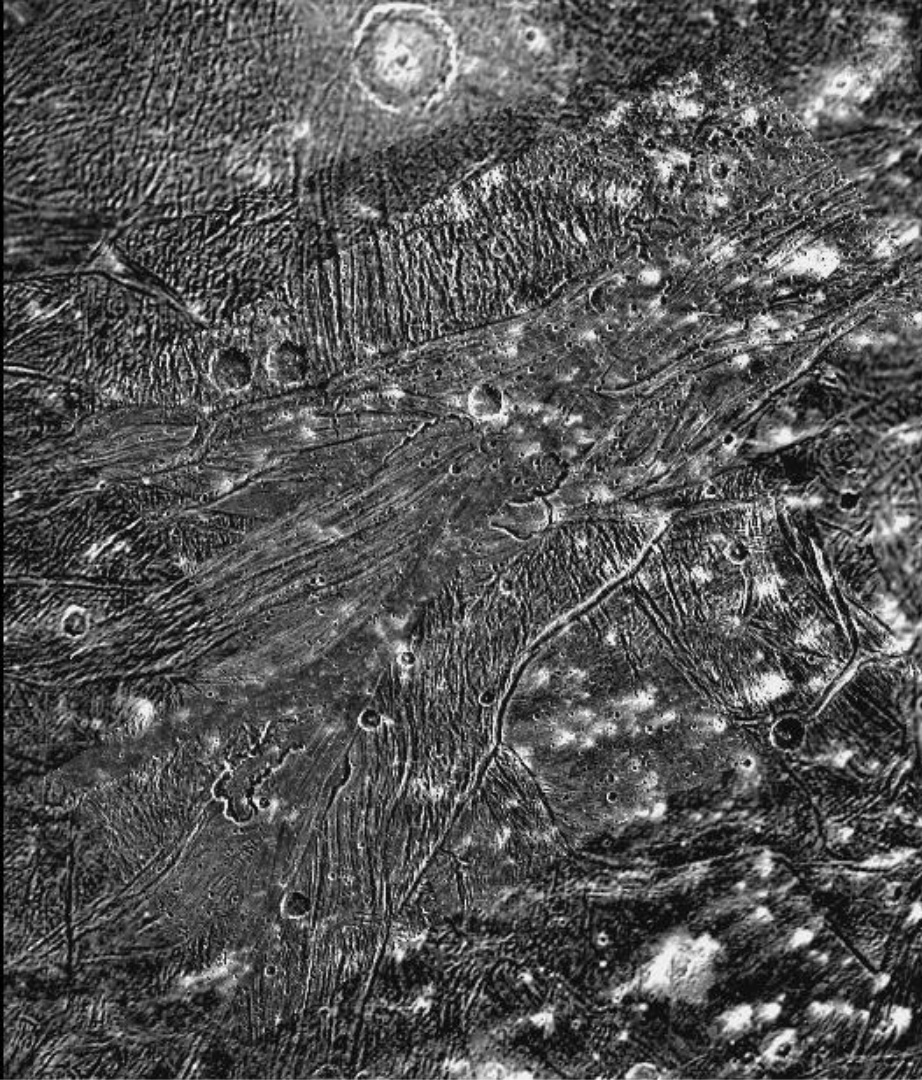
The area surrounding Musa Patera (the lobate feature in the lower left), imaged by the Galileo spacecraft in May 1997. The crater at the top is Bes

The Galileo spacecraft's images reveal that one of these structures contains a lobate, flow-like feature representing the strongest candidate yet identified for an icy volcanic lava flow on Ganymede. The structure consists of a prominent depression with scalloped walls and internal terraces, measuring approximately 55 kilometers (km) in length and 17–20 km in width. Within the floor of this depression lies a lobate deposit 7–10 km wide, characterized by outward-curving ridges that appear to trend downslope toward a cross-cutting lane of grooved terrain. The morphology of the feature is consistent with volcanic eruptions that may have excavated a channel, emplaced a flow, and eroded into the surface.

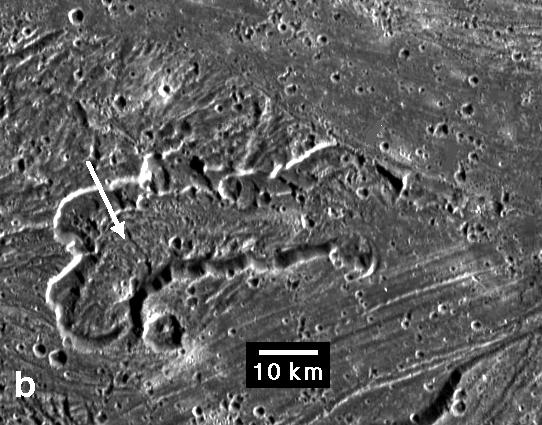
A zoomed-in image of Musa Patera, taken by the Galileo spacecraft.

Musa Patera is a potential, ground-level cryovolcano on Ganymede. Elevation modeling further indicates that the westernmost caldera-floor material (indicated by a white arrow in the image above) is comparable in height to adjacent grooved terrain but decreases eastward, where it approaches the elevation of nearby, lower-lying smooth terrain. This smooth terrain, which generally lacks grooves or stripes, extends across the upper portion of the image and crosscuts a similar but grooved band in the lower right.

However, as of 2025, evidence for cryovolcanism on Ganymede remains ambiguous, and higher-spatial-resolution imaging from future missions is needed.

== Exploration ==
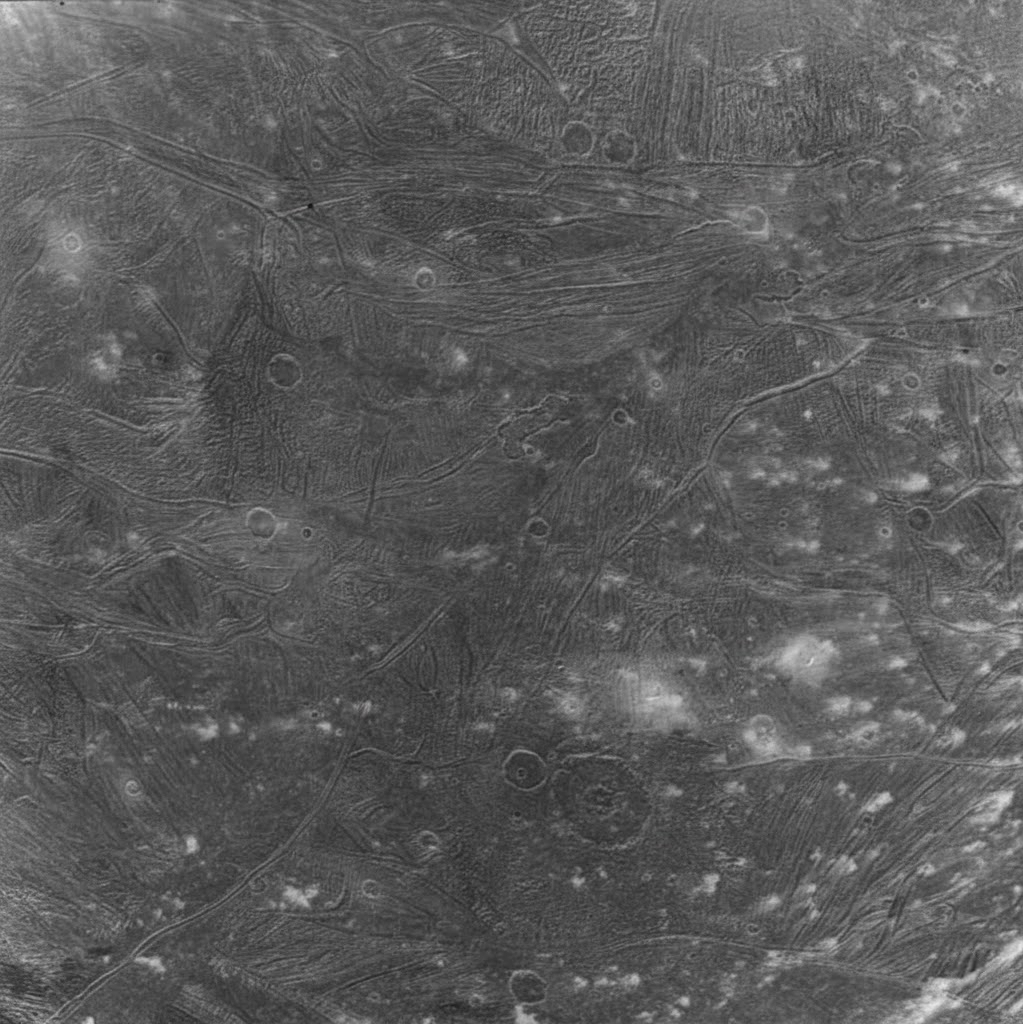
An image of Ganymede showing Musa Patera just slightly above the center. This image was taken by Voyager 2 in July 1979.

As of 2025, Musa Patera has been clearly photographed by only two space probes: Voyager 2 the Galileo space probe.

Although Voyager 2 was able to photograph Musa Patera during its flyby of Ganymede in July 1979, the depression was too small and the probe was not close enough to capture any important details in the images.

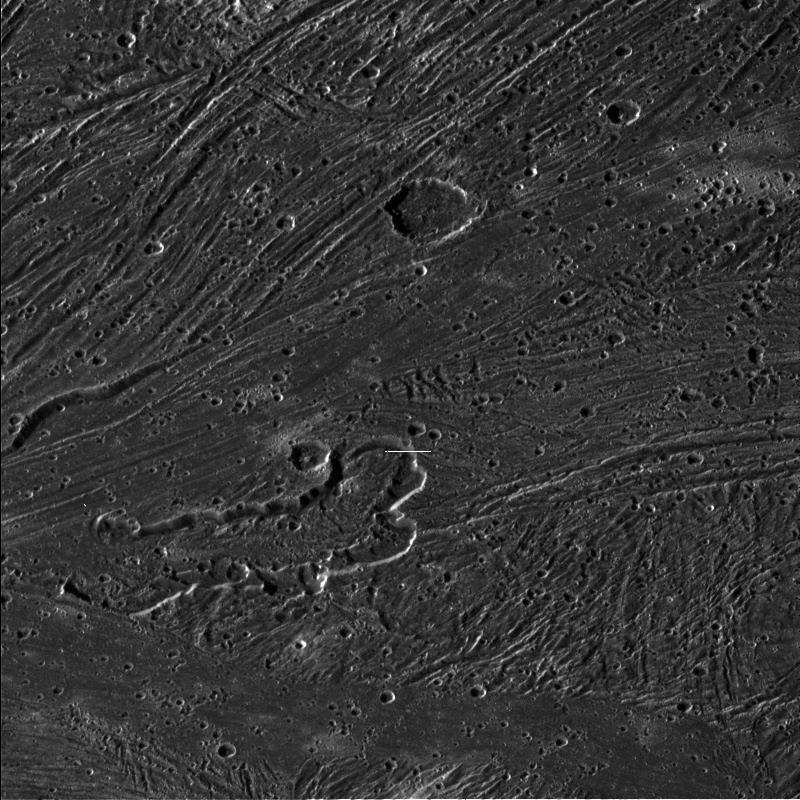
A mosaic image of Musa Patera from a low angle, taken by the Galileo spacecraft in May 1997.

Galileo was able to provide excellent-resolution images of Musa Patera during its orbit around Jupiter between December 1995 and September 2003. In May 1997, the probe flew as low as 17,490 km (10,870 mi) above the patera, and was able to resolve details as small as 172 m (564 ft). As of date, Galileo's images of Musa Patera are the best available images of the depression.

=== Future Missions ===
The European Space Agency's (ESA) space probe called the Jupiter Icy Moons Explorer (Juice) was launched in April 2023 and is on its way to Jupiter. The probe is expected to arrive at Jupiter in July 2031. In 2034, Juice is expected to settle into a low orbit around Ganymede at a distance of just 500 kilometres (310 mi). It is expected that Juice will achieve extremely high spatial resolution imaging of Ganymede, allowing scientists to determine whether Musa Patera is in fact a cryovolcano.

== See also ==
- List of geological features on Ganymede
- Natrun and Rum Paterae - another set of potential ground level cryovolcanoes
