= Sippar Sulcus =

Bright region on Ganymede

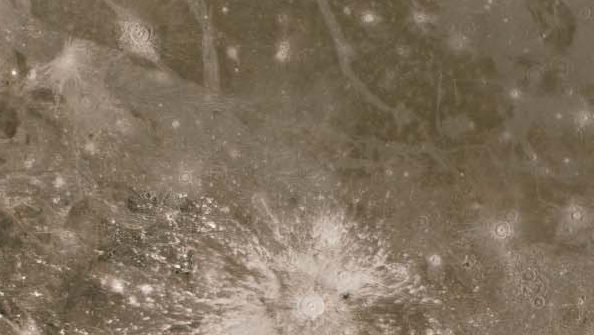
- A Mercator projection image of Sippar Sulcus. The bright crater to the south is Osiris.
- Feature type: Sulcus
- Coordinates: 19.9°S 170.20°W
- Length: 3,260 kilometres (2,030 mi)
- Eponym: Sippar

Sippar Sulcus is a large grooved terrain on Jupiter's largest moon Ganymede. It is a trough that runs for approximately 3,260 kilometres (2,030 mi) across the moon's surface and is likely a result of cryovolcanism. Its surface is believed to be significantly younger than the darker terrain that are close to it.

== Naming ==
The International Astronomical Union (IAU) named Sippar Sulcus after an ancient Mesopotamian city called Sippar—the center of worship for Shamash, the all-seeing god of the sun and justice in Mesopotamian mythology. The now-ruined city of Sippar once housed a temple to Shamash that was greatly revered by several ancient Mesopotamian empires.

The name was chosen in line with the convention that surface features and craters on Ganymede be named after deities, heroes and places from Ancient Middle Eastern mythology, to which Mesopotamian mythology belongs. The IAU approved the name for Sippar Sulcus in 1985.

== Location ==
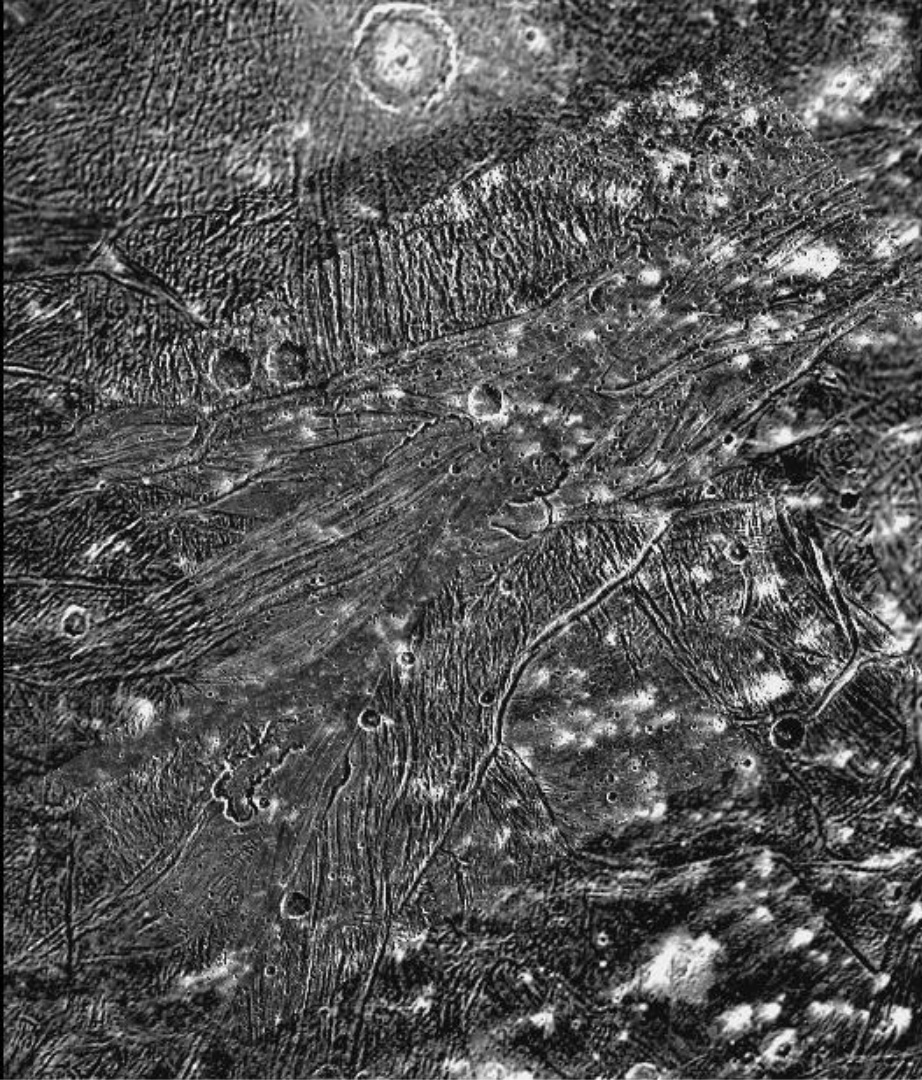
An image of the southern portion of Sippar Sulcus, taken by the Galileo space probe in May 1997. The crater at the top of the image is Bes.

Sippar Sulcus is a long surface feature located south of Ganymede's equator. It begins at the edge of another sulcus called Tiamat Sulcus, and runs eastward for more than 3,000 kilometres (1,900 mi). Along its path, it encounters several craters such as Eshmun, and Bes. About five-sixths of the way along its length, Sippar Sulcus branches into two before terminating at the western edge of Babylon Sulci.

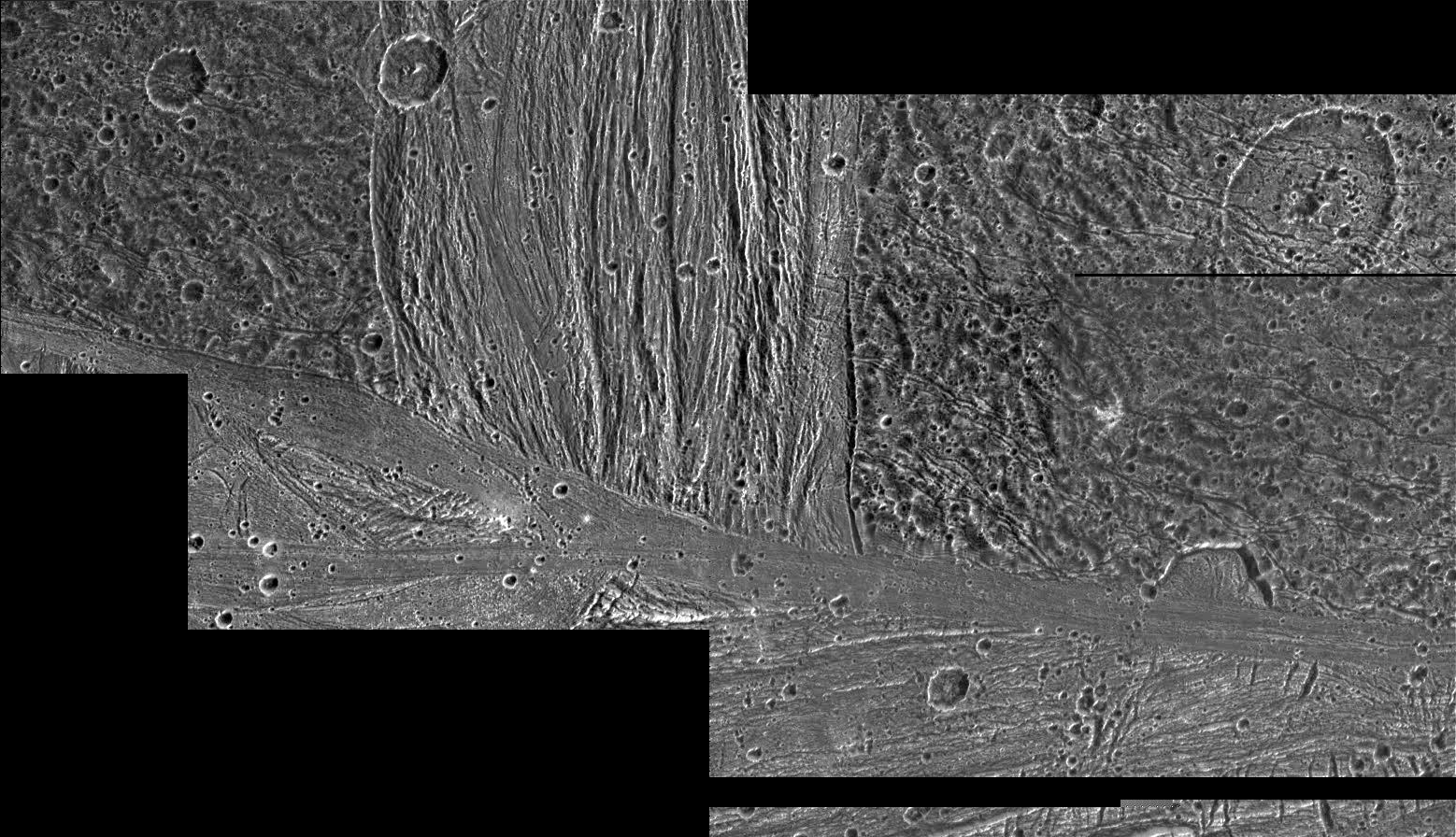
An image of a northern section of Sippar Sulcus (below), where it meets the more ancient Marius Regio (upper left and right) and crosses paths with Erech Sulcus (above), taken by Galileo in May 1997. The crater to the upper left is Erichthonius

Sippar Sulcus is located south of the ancient dark region known as Marius Regio, where it marks the southern boundary of the area. To the north of Sippar Sulcus lie the craters Melkart, Amset, and Erichthonius, as well as another sulcus called Erech Sulcus. To the northeast is Lagash Sulcus, and to the southeast is the crater Menhit. To the south of Sippar Sulcus lie Mummu Sulci and the bright, major ray crater Osiris.

Because of its considerable size, Sippar Sulcus crosses three quadrangles (or sections) of Ganymede—the Uruk, Apsu and Osiris quadrangles (designated Jg8, Jg12, and Jg13, respectively).

The southwestern part of Sippar Sulcus is considered a part of Mummu Sulci on the map produced by the United States Geological Survey (USGS).

== Geology and Characteristics ==
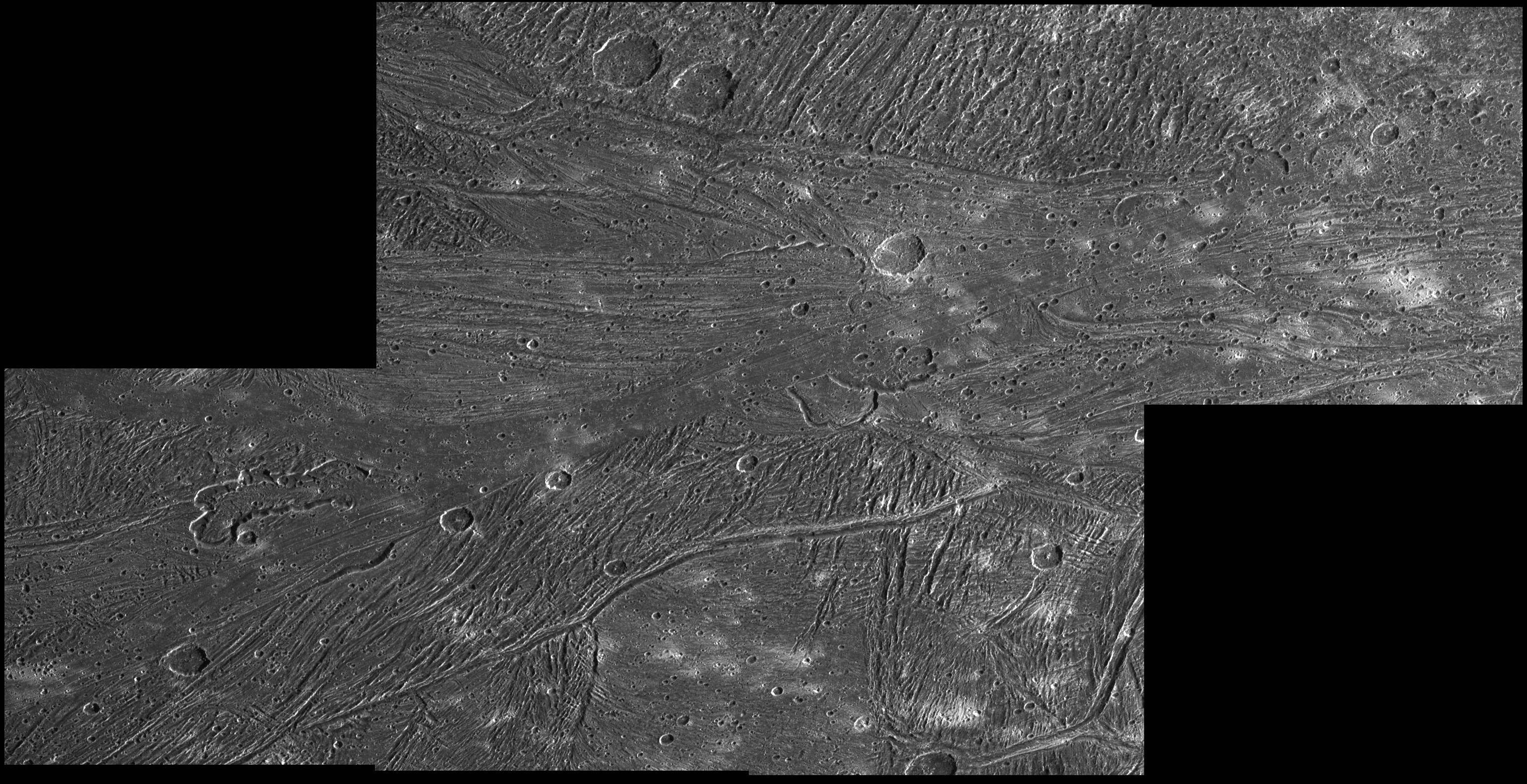
A mosaic image of Sippar Sulcus, taken by the Galileo space probe in May 1997.

Like many of Ganymede's bright regions, Sippar Sulcus is one of the moon's relatively young, bright terrains characterized by multiple generations of ridges and grooves. In places where these younger grooved terrains intersect with darker, older regions, their contact zones often reveal age relationships between the contrasting terrains. Younger and smoother sinuous grooves cut across and overprint older, more rugged terrains, which is clearly visible from orbit. This ongoing modification and resurfacing of ancient terrain by later tectonic activity is commonplace on Ganymede and plays a key role in shaping its surface. In this case, Sippar Sulcus overprinted and resurfaced the southern portion of Marius Regio.

The bright terrains on Ganymede are analogous to the dark Lunar maria on the Earth's Moon in terms of age since both are considered the youngest parts of their respective moons' surfaces. The Lunar lava flows' dark basalt composition that created the younger, dark parts of the Moon's surface is substituted with bright water ice on Ganymede. Conversely, the dark terrains on Ganymede are analogous to the bright Lunar highlands which are older than the surface of Lunar maria.

== Age ==
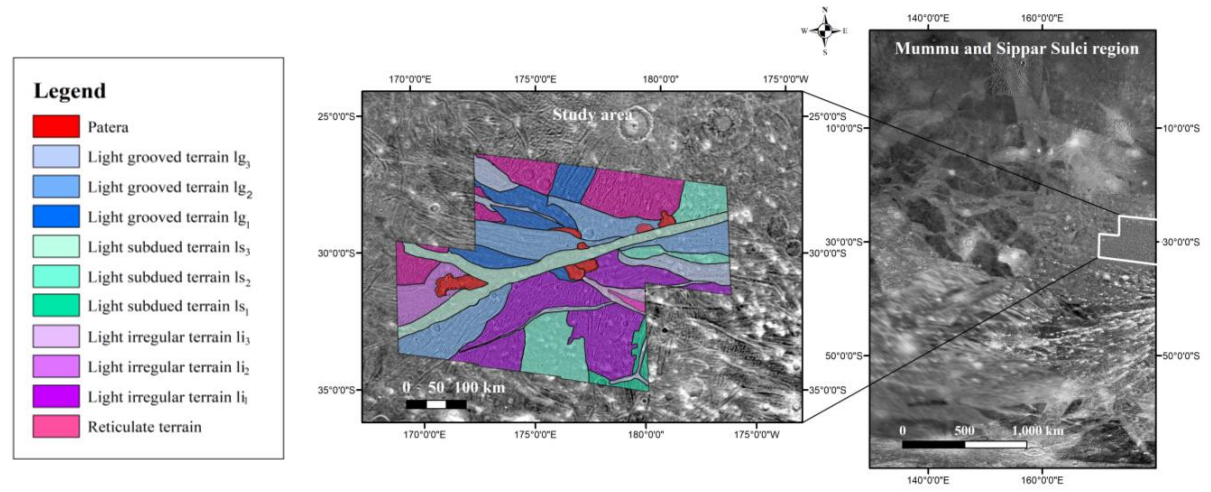
A geographical map of the area where the Sippar and Mummu Sulci merge.

Sippar Sulcus is part of a complex, multi-stage light-terrain system. Sippar Sulcus is mapped together with Mummu Sulci as part of a single light-terrain area on Ganymede in some studies. The light terrain in this region is not uniform but subdivided into several distinct terrain types based on groove strength and morphology. Sippar Sulcus contains multiple generations of these terrains that were formed by several resurfacing events rather than a single event.

According to a study conducted by the Lunar and Planetary Institute in 2022, using cross-cutting relationships between the grooved-terrain, Sippar and Mummu Sulci can be classified into three relative-age categories: Category 1, the oldest, consists of units that are cut by all others; Category 2 is intermediate in age; and Category 3, which is the youngest, comprises units that cut all adjacent terrains.

A narrow northeast–to–southwest–trending band within the Sippar-Mummu Sulci region (categorized as an ls₃ terrain in the map) crosscuts all surrounding units, including the paterae within the region, strongly implying late-stage tectonic activity that deformed and cut even earlier paterae. This feature is therefore interpreted as the youngest part of the sulcus. However, crater-counting results appear inconsistent with cross-cutting relationships, as the sulcus's youngest unit exhibits a crater density suggesting it is similar in age to, or slightly older than, some of the terrains it intersects. In addition, nearby terrains south of Sippar Sulcus display inverted age relationships. These discrepancies are likely caused by secondary craters originating from a nearby bright ray crater like Osiris, erosion or modification of craters during tectonic resurfacing, and the inherent limitations of crater-counting methods on heavily deformed icy surfaces.

Lastly, the study concluded that Sippar Sulcus is most likely younger than Ganymede's reticulate terrain.

== Candidate Zone for Cryovolcanism ==
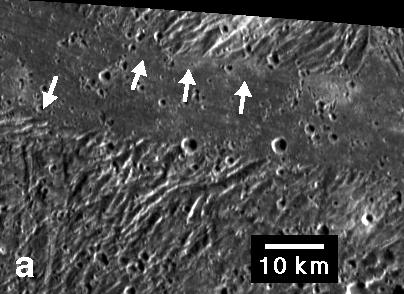
A close-up image of a portion of Sippar Sulcus. The flow indicated by the arrows is interpreted as evidence that, in the past, the low-lying area was filled by flooding with low-viscosity material, such as water or water–ice slush, acting as lava-like material.

According to studies, by examining the zones where Sippar Sulcus's younger, brighter terrain meets older, darker terrain, it appears that many parts of Sippar Sulcus experienced flooding by low-viscosity materials, such as water and water slush, welling up from beneath Ganymede's surface. Close-up images of Sippar Sulcus reveal a lobate, flow-like feature that represents the strongest evidence so far for an icy volcanic lava flow on Ganymede. This process is similar to how lava flows on rocky bodies like Earth; however, on icy moons like Ganymede, water replaces lava.

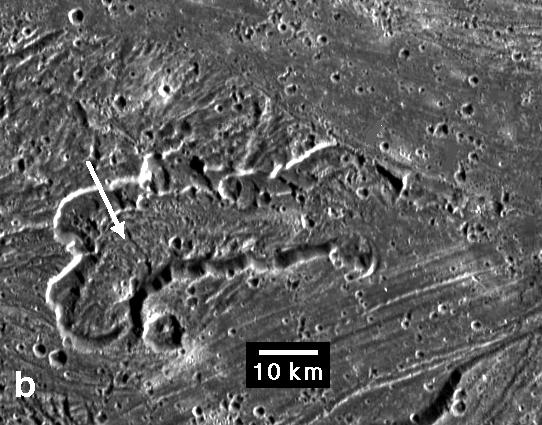
A close-up image of Musa Patera, a possible cryovolcanic caldera in Sippar Sulcus, taken by Galileo in May 1997.

An isolated, irregular depression in Sippar Sulcus, called Musa Patera, is a candidate cryovolcanic pit. Elevation modeling shows that the materials on the westernmost caldera floor (indicated by an arrow in the image) is roughly the same height as the adjacent grooved terrain but gradually declines toward the east (right), where it matches the elevation of nearby lower-lying smooth terrain. This smooth terrain, mostly devoid of grooves or striations, spans the upper half of the image and intersects a similar grooved band in the lower right.

Other paterae such as Rum and Natrun also populate the vicinity.

As of 2025, evidence for cryovolcanism on Ganymede, including in Sippar Sulcus, remains ambiguous due to insufficient spatial-resolution imaging. Future missions are required to fully test and confirm the hypothesis that Sippar Sulcus is a cryovolcanic zone.

== Exploration ==
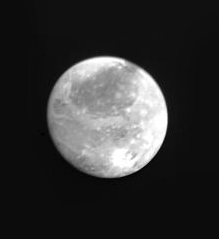
A low-resolution image of Ganymede, taken by Voyager 1 in February 1979 as it was still approaching Ganymede. Sippar Sulcus is the bright region in the lower left part of the image.

Sippar Sulcus first appeared in images returned by Voyager 1 as the spacecraft approached Jupiter and Ganymede during the final days of February 1979. However, Ganymede was still several million kilometers away during this approach, allowing Voyager 1 to obtain only low-resolution images of the region. By the time the spacecraft made its closest approach to Ganymede on 5 March 1979, Sippar Sulcus had already rotated onto the moon's night side.

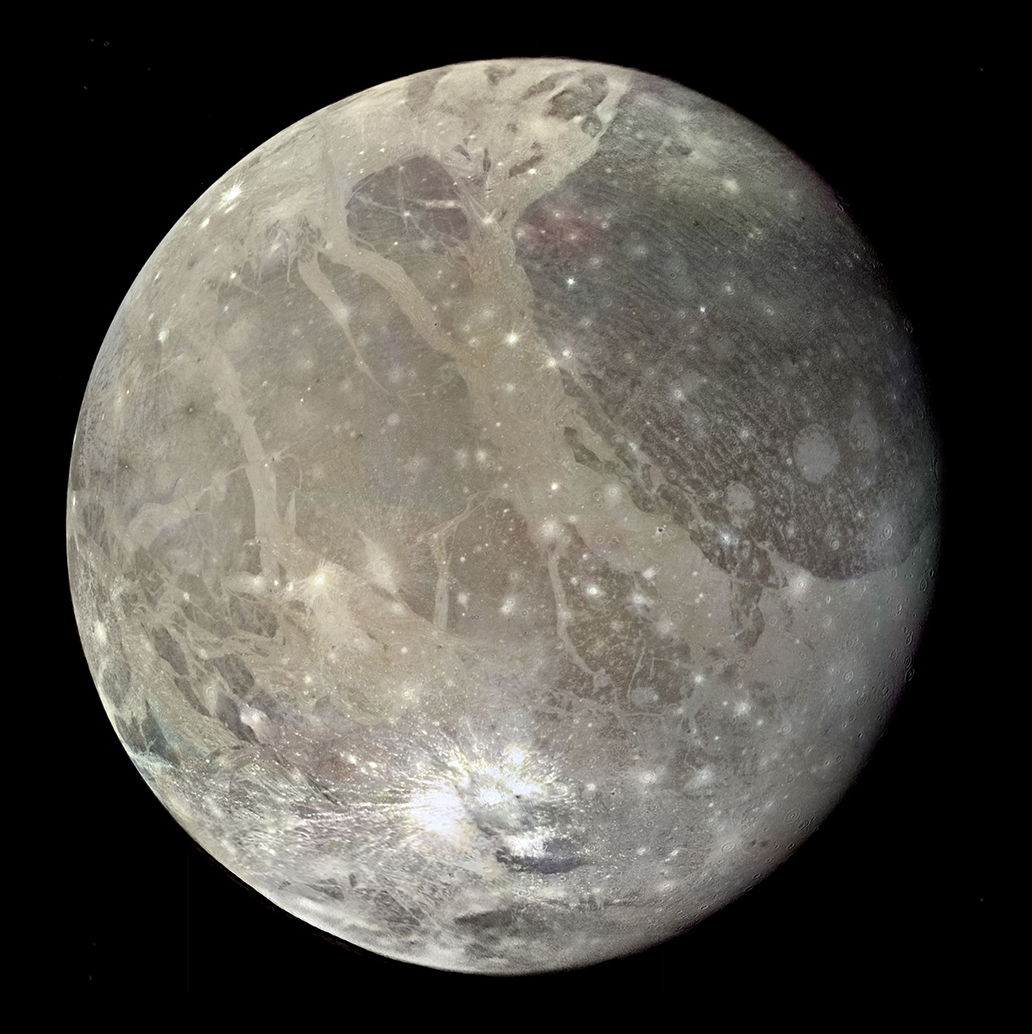
A mosaic image of Ganymede that shows Sippar Sulcus (slightly below the center), taken by Voyager 2 in July 1979. The bright crater to the south is Osiris.

During Voyager 2's quick flyby of Jupiter and Ganymede in July 1979, it was able to photograph the entirety of Sippar Sulcus, although it could not take any close-up images because its trajectory toward Saturn required that it not pass close to Ganymede.

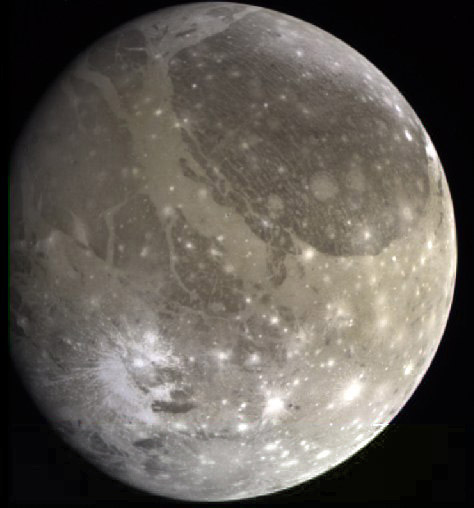
A global image of Ganymede showing Sippar Sulcus (slightly below the center; slightly to the left), as imaged by the Galileo space probe in June 1996

Galileo provided the first and only close-up images of Sippar Sulcus to date because, unlike Voyager 2, it orbited Jupiter from December 1995 to September 2003, and was able to pass close to the moon on several occasions. However, Sippar Sulcus is extremely large, and only its southern portion was imaged in close-up by Galileo in May 1997 when the probe flew as low as 17,490 km (10,870 mi) above the sulcus. Galileo was able to resolve details as small as 172 m (564 ft) and observe surface features such as Musa Patera, which provided some of the first evidence of cryovolcanism on Ganymede.

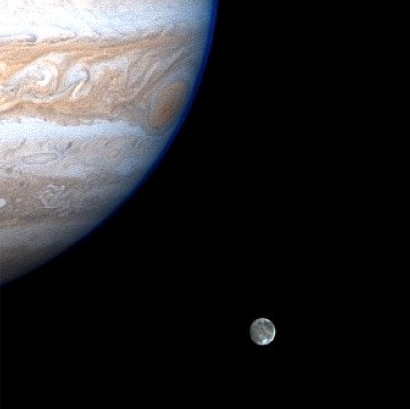
A distant image of Ganymede, taken in December 2000 by Cassini.

The Cassini probe was only able to image Sippar Sulcus from a great distance of 10,000,000 kilometres (6,200,000 mi) in December, 2000. Sippar Sulcus is sufficiently large enough to be visible from a great distance, although its surface details are not discernible.

=== Future missions ===
The European Space Agency's (ESA) Jupiter Icy Moons Explorer (Juice), which was launched in April 2023, is scheduled to arrive at Jupiter in July 2031. After spending around three and a half years in orbit around Jupiter and performing multiple flybys of Europa, Callisto and Ganymede, Juice will settle into a low polar orbit around Ganymede at a distance of as low as 500 kilometres (310 mi). Juice is expected complete the high-resolution maps of Sippar Sulcus that Galileo started.

== See also ==
Sulcus (geology)
