= Eshmun (crater) =

Crater on Ganymede

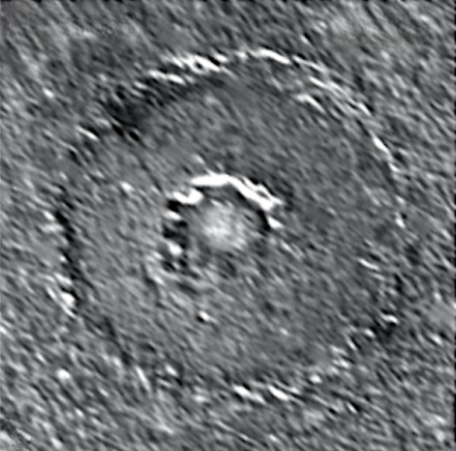
- An image of Eshmun crater, taken by Voyager 2 on 9 July 1979.
- Feature type: Dome Crater
- Coordinates: 17.45°S 192.12°W
- Diameter: 98 kilometres (61 mi)
- Eponym: Eshmun

Eshmun is a crater on Jupiter's largest moon Ganymede. The crater features a central dome surrounded by a circular trench, with an outer rim approximately 98 kilometres (61 mi) in diameter.

== Naming ==
Eshmun is named after the tutelary god of the Phoenician city of Sidon. An inscription carved on the ancient sarcophagus of a Sidonian king likely states that Eshmun is the “Baal of Sidon,” where the term Baal is a title meaning “lord.” He was the god of healing, and Sidon still hosts an ancient temple ruin that was dedicated to him.

The crater's name follows the IAU's convention of naming craters on Ganymede after deities, heroes and places from Ancient Middle Eastern mythologies, including Phoenician mythology. The name was approved by the IAU in 1979

== Location ==
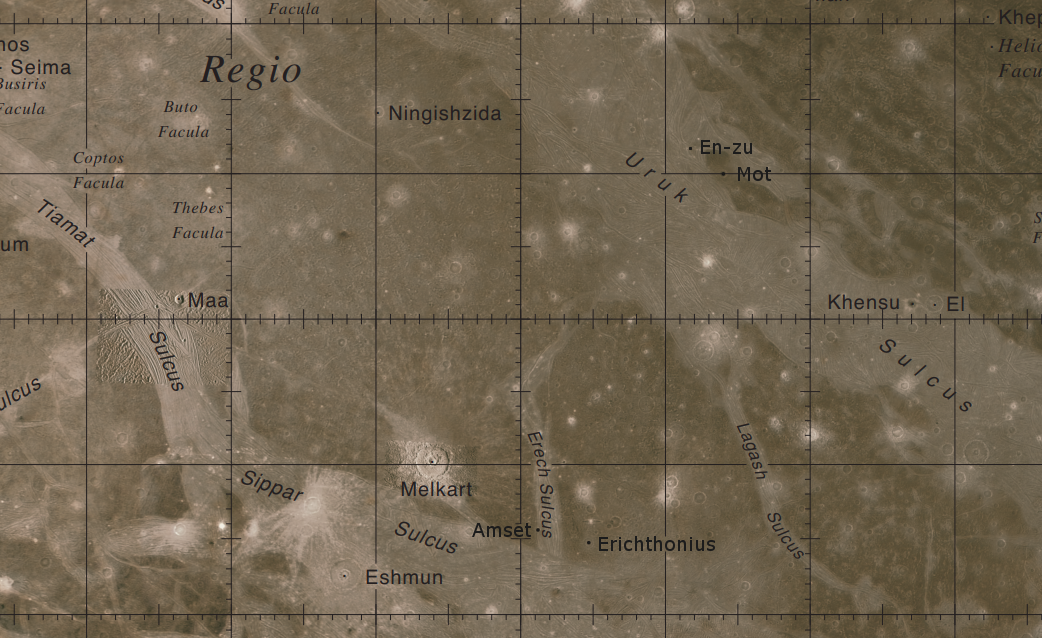
The location of Eshmun, shown in this map of the Uruk Sulcus quadrangle of Ganymede.

Eshmun is located at the southwestern boundary of a bright, grooved terrain on Ganymede known as Sippar Sulcus.

To its northeast, on the other side of Sippar Sulcus, lies the crater Melkart, which has a similar dome structure to Eshmun. To its east are the craters Erichthonius and Amset, as well as the junction between Sippar Sulcus and Erech Sulcus. To the southeast is the crater Bes.

Eshmun is situated within the southern edge of Uruk Sulcus quadrangle (or section) of Ganymede's surface (designated Jg8)

Eshmun is located on the hemisphere of Ganymede that always faces away from Jupiter. Due to the moon's synchronous rotation as it orbit around its parent planet, one hemisphere of Ganymede always points Jupiter while the opposite hemisphere always faces away. Therefore, an observer at Eshmun would never see Jupiter in the sky. (Note: For moons in synchronous rotation, such as Ganymede, 0° longitude corresponds to the part of the surface that always faces Jupiter. Regions between 90° W and 270° W longitude never face the moon’s parent planet.)

== Morphology and Formation ==
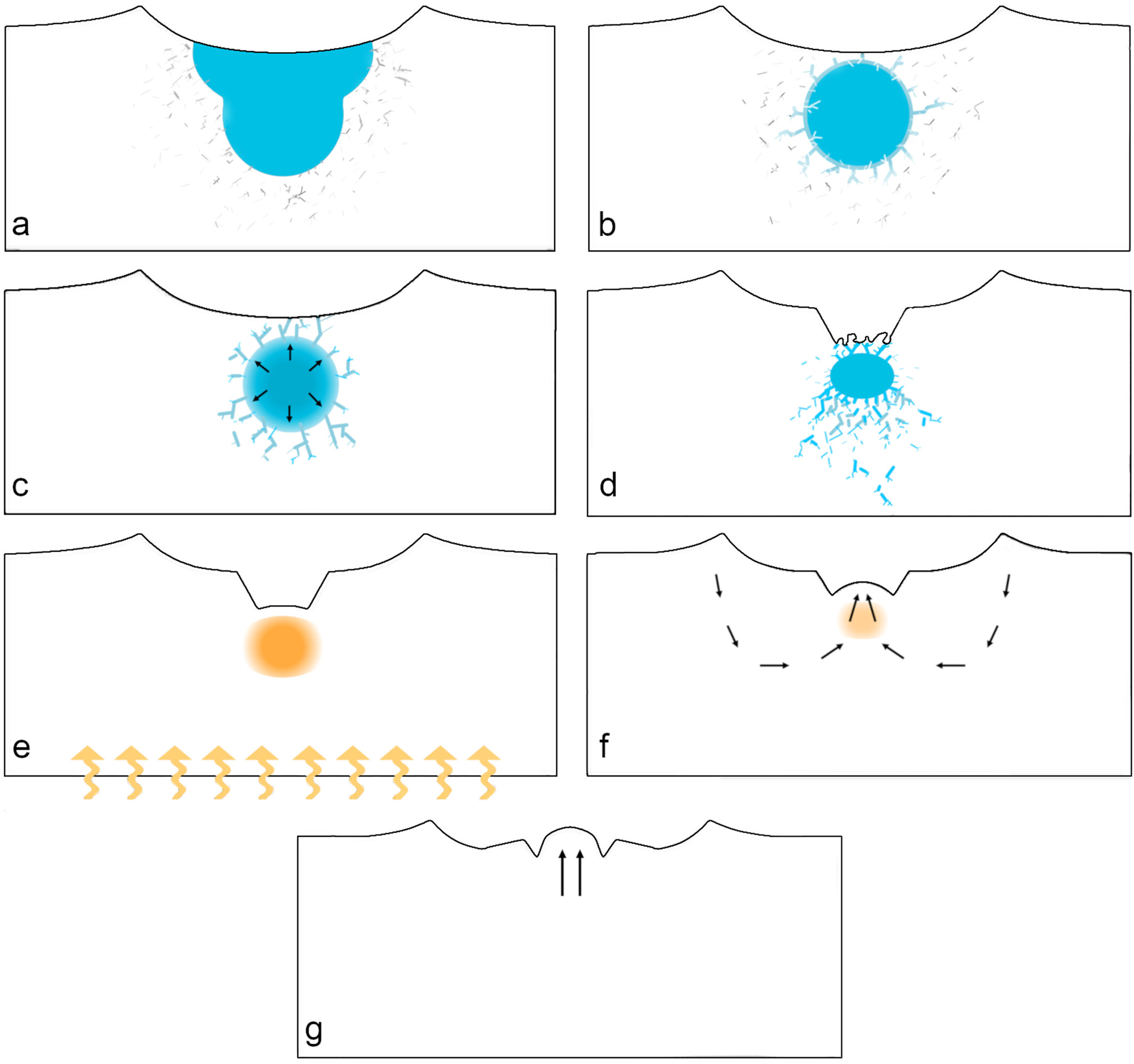
A diagram showing the steps in the formation of dome craters on icy moons like Ganymede.It demonstrates how the refreezing of meltwater from meteorite impacts can lead to the formation of sinkholes, which transform craters into pit craters, as well as the development of domes through the expansion of the moon's icy crust.

Eshmun is a crater with a dome at its center. Dome craters are fairly common on Ganymede and other icy moons, but they are considered unusual by terrestrial standards because such craters do not form on rocky worlds like the Earth or the Moon. Instead of having central peaks like on rocky world, Eshmun and dome craters feature a rounded central dome surrounded by a ring scarp or ring of massifs.

Planetary scientists believe that dome craters on Ganymede form when meltwater develops beneath impact craters after an asteroid or comet strikes the moon's surface, causing intense heating at the impact site. As this subsurface meltwater later refreezes—and because water ice expands upon freezing—it fractures and uplifts the crater floor, leading to the formation of a central pit, in a manner similar to the development of sinkholes.

Over time, continued freezing causes the meltwater to expand further, forcing the crater floor upward and producing the distinctive dome seen in many of Ganymede's craters. Eventually, the dome grows large enough to cover most or all of the crater, leading to the gradual obliteration of the original crater as it is overtaken by the dome. Domes usually only form if a crater is more than 60 kilometers in diameter.

Other dome craters comparable to Eshmun in structure include Neith, which is located on the opposite side of Ganymede, and Melkart, which lies nearby.

== Exploration ==
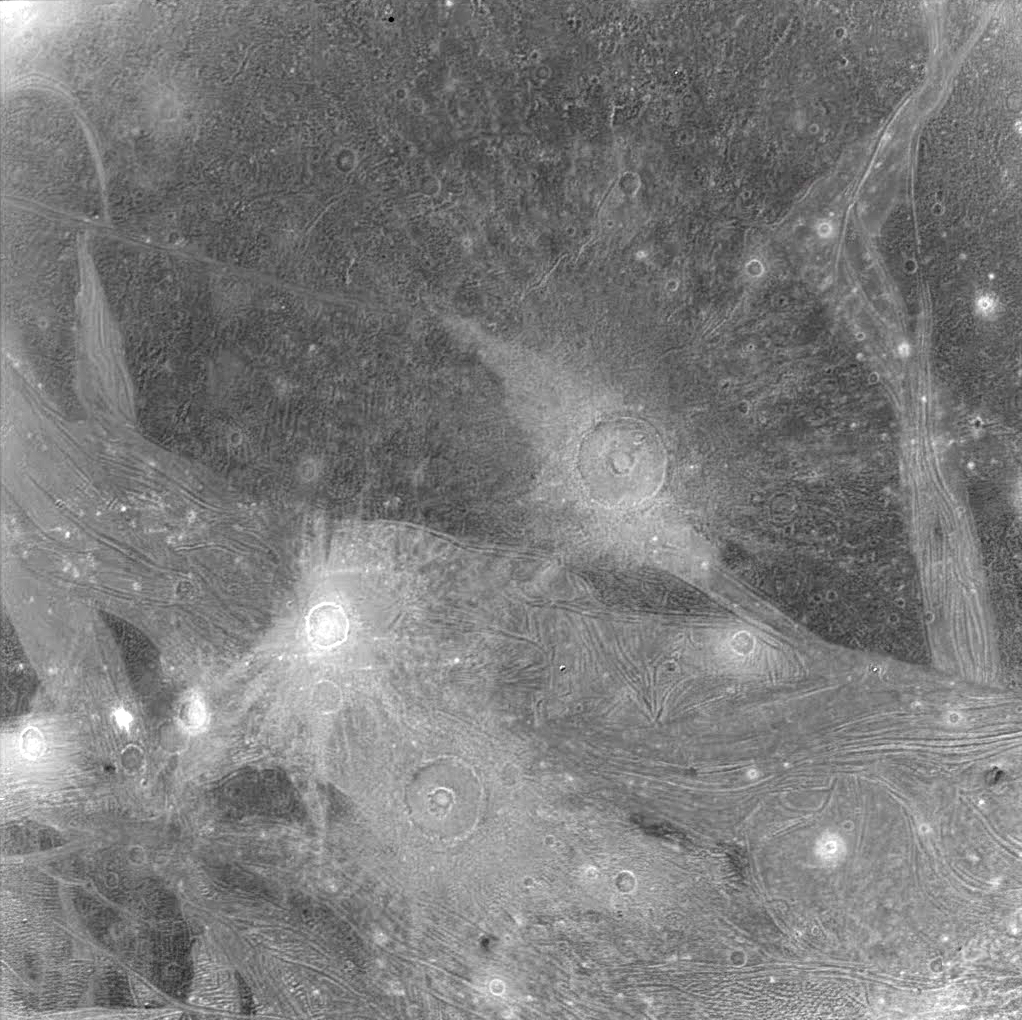
An image of the craters Eshmun (halfway below the center) and Melkart (slightly right from the center), taken by Voyager 2 in July 1979.

Voyager 2 became the first spacecraft to explore and image Eshmun in July 1979. During its brief flyby, it managed to image Eshmun crater at a resolution of about 500 metres (1,600 ft)/pixel, which was sufficient to reveal details of the crater's central dome and scarps.

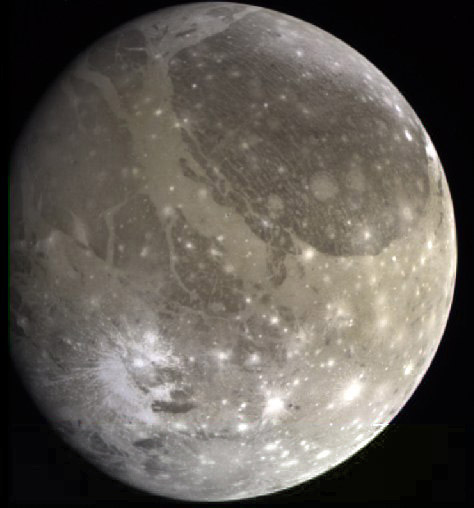
Eshmun (the crater near the left edge) on Ganymede, as imaged by the Galileo space probe in June 1996

The next probe to observe Eshmun was Galileo during its flyby of Ganymede in June 1996. Although Galileo imaged the nearby dome crater Melkart up close during its G8 flyby, it was not able to image Eshmun at the same resolution.

=== Future missions ===
The European Space Agency's (ESA) Jupiter Icy Moons Explorer (Juice) orbiter is scheduled to arrive at Jupiter in July 2031. After spending approximately three and a half years in orbit around Jupiter and performing multiple flybys of Europa, Ganymede and Callisto, Juice will settle into a low polar orbit around Ganymede. Juice is expected to image Eshmun at a higher resolution than what was achieved by Voyager 2.

== See also ==
- List of craters on Ganymede
- Meteor
