= Melkart (crater) =

Impact basin on Ganymede

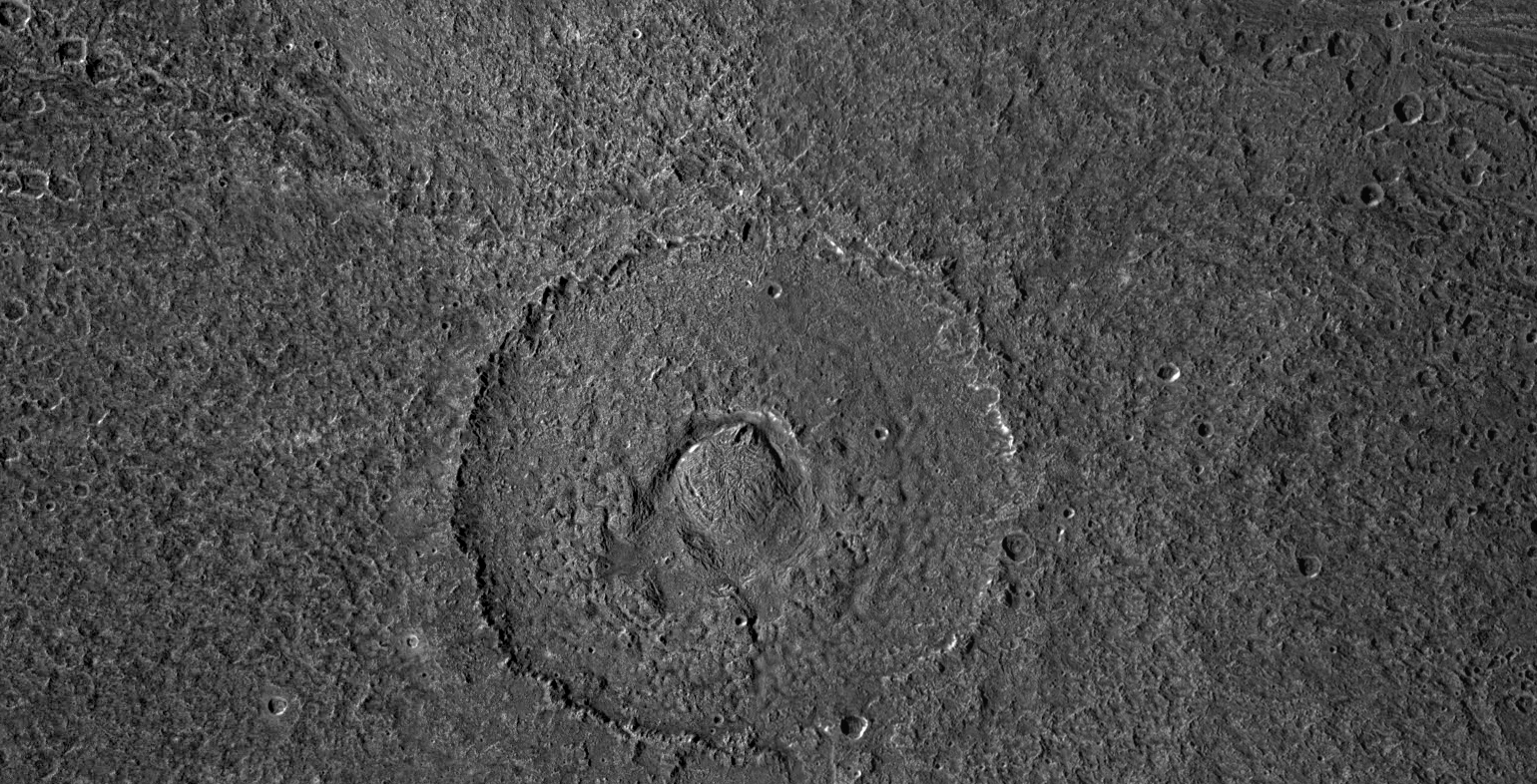
- A Galileo image of Melkart and its surroundings, taken on 7 May 1997.
- Feature type: Bright ray dome crater
- Location: Ganymede
- Coordinates: 9.86°S 186.07°W
- Diameter: 103 kilometres (64 mi)
- Eponym: Melqart

Melkart is an impact basin on Ganymede, the largest moon of Jupiter. 103 kilometres (64 mi) in size, its center hosts a distinct dome, surrounded by an irregularly-shaped depression and a rugged crater floor.

== Naming ==
The crater is named after Melqart, the tutelary god of the Phoenician city-state of Tyre, and the "Ba'al" (or Chief lord) of the city.

Its name was officially adopted by the International Astronomical Union (IAU) in 1979, in line with the convention of naming all craters on Ganymede after deities, heroes, and places from Ancient Middle Eastern mythology. The city of Tyre and its associated deities belong to Phoenician mythology, one of the many mythological traditions of the Ancient Middle East.

== Location ==
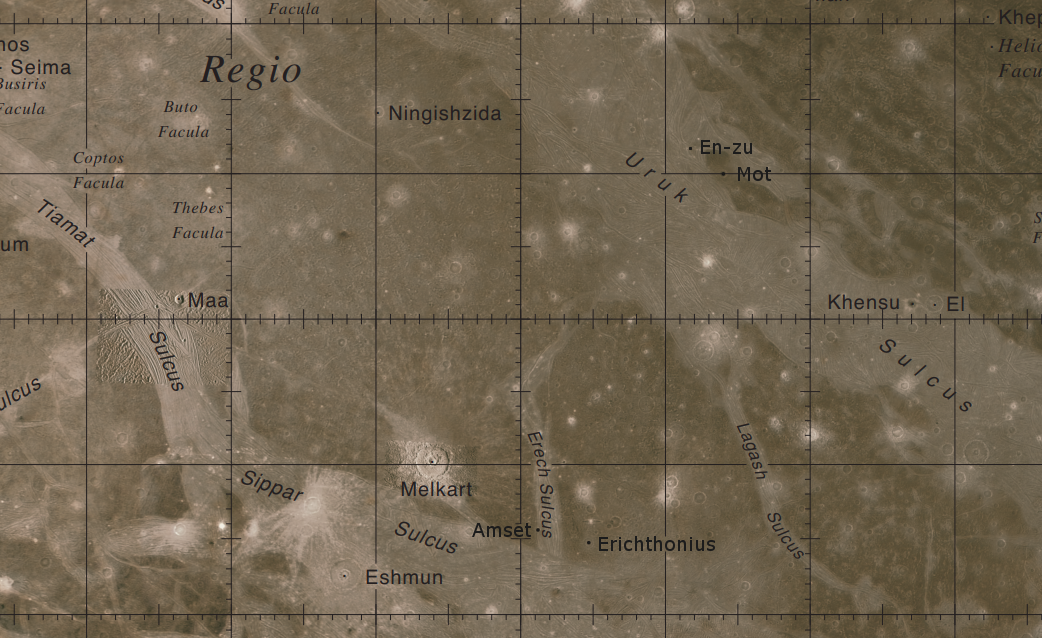
A map of the Uruk Sulcus quadrangle on Ganymede, showing the location of Melkart.

Melkart is located on the western border of Marius Regio, a large region of dark terrain. It partially overlies a small northwest–southeast oriented sulcus that branches off from Tiamat Sulcus and connects to Sippar Sulcus.

To Melkart's southwest is another dome crater called Eshmun, while to the east is a bright, grooved terrain known as Erech Sulcus. Finally, to the southwest lies a small but relatively young and sharp crater called Amset.

Melkart is situated in the southern portion of the Uruk Sulcus quadrangle (designated Jg8) of Ganymede.

Melkart is located on the hemisphere of Ganymede that is always facing away from Jupiter. Due to the moon's synchronous rotation as it orbit around its parent planet, one hemisphere of Ganymede always points Jupiter while the opposite hemisphere never does. Therefore, an observer at Melkart would never see Jupiter in the sky. (Note: For moons in synchronous rotation, such as Ganymede, 0° longitude corresponds to the part of the surface that always faces Jupiter. Regions between 90° W to 180° W to 270° W longitude never face the moon’s parent planet.)

== Geography and geology ==
Melkart is about 103 kilometres (64 mi) in diameter and it is surrounded by a vast bright ejecta ray system.

Its interior is dominated by a central dome 20–25 kilometres (12–16 mi) wide with a base–height elevation of 1.36 kilometres (0.85 mi), which is thought to have formed when warm icy material upwelled from the subsurface. The dome is slightly off-center to the northeast and is cut by several fractures and lineaments; its offset implies that the formative impactor struck the surface in a south-southwest to north-northeast direction. An irregular smooth-floored depression surrounds the dome, and the crater floor has both knobbed and smooth terrain. Its floor is divided into a darker and lighter section, which may correlate to the darker and lighter terrains of Marius Regio and the unnamed sulcus, respectively. A northwest-trending tectonic fault that cuts across the eastern portion of the crater delineates this divide. The fault is a right-lateral strike-slip fault, though it has a limited offset of less than 5 km (3.1 mi) at Melkart's crater rims. The fault has two main stepover zones at the central dome's borders, allowing for local contraction or extension.

Observations of Melkart's surface spectrum from Galileo's NIMS instrument indicate that its surface is composed of a mixture of water ice and hydrated minerals. The abundance of crystalline water ice varies between 50 and 75%; darker regions are associated with a lower abundance in water ice and higher abundance in relatively dark hydrated minerals. The lighter and darker portions of its floor, though roughly coinciding with the border of Marius Regio, does not strictly correspond to any geological units within the crater itself. This may suggest that the border of Marius Regio was gradual at Melkart's site or that the darker material is only a shallow surface layer.

== Exploration ==
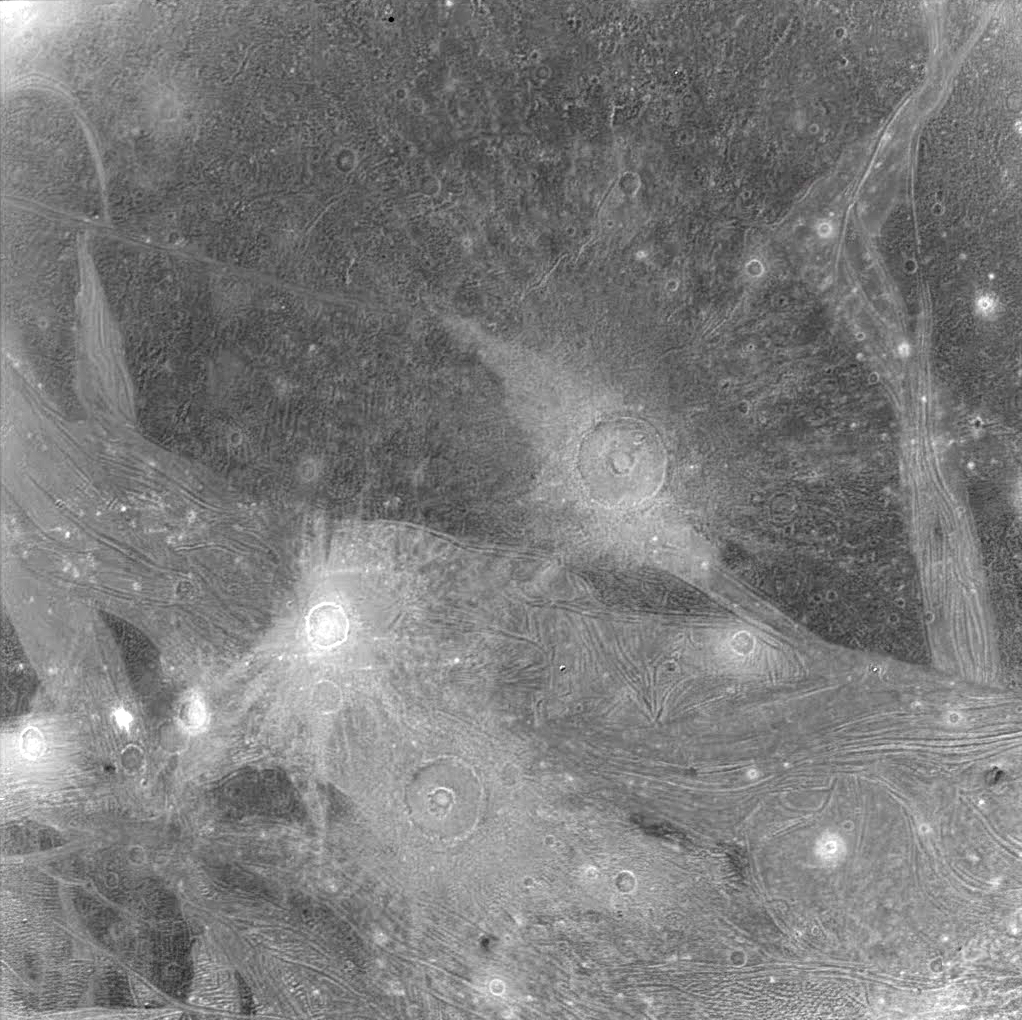
Melkart (slightly to the right from the center), taken by Voyager 2 in July 1979. Another crater called Eshmun is halfway below the center of the image.

Voyager 1 became the first spacecraft to spot and image Melkart when it photographed Ganymede from a great distance while approaching the Jovian system on 27–28 February 1979. At the time, Ganymede was still several million kilometres away, allowing the spacecraft to obtain only low-resolution images of the feature. By the time of Voyager 1's closest approach to Ganymede in March 1979, Melkart had already rotated onto the moon's night side.

Since Voyager 1's images of Melkart were of disappointingly low quality, Voyager 2 became the first probe to take clear images of Melkart during its flyby of Ganymede and the Jovian system in July 1979. Melkart appears in many of its images as a bright crater superimposed on the darker surface of Marius Regio.

Galileo became the most recent spacecraft to image Melkart during its eight-year mission in orbit around Jupiter, from December 1995 to September 2003. Galileo made a very close flyby of the area around Melkart during its G8 orbit in May 1997, allowing it to resolve details within the crater that are as small as 180 metres (590 ft) per pixel.

=== Future missions ===
The European Space Agency's (ESA) Jupiter Icy Moons Explorer (Juice) was launched in April 2023 and is scheduled to arrive at Jupiter in July 2031. In July 2034, Juice will enter a low orbit around Ganymede at an altitude of approximately 500 kilometres (310 mi). The probe is expected to return high-resolution images of Melkart, helping planetary scientists better understand the evolution of Ganymede's craters as they develop domes and modified by tectonic processes.

== See also ==
- List of craters on Ganymede
- Meteor
