= Hershef (crater) =

Crater on Ganymede

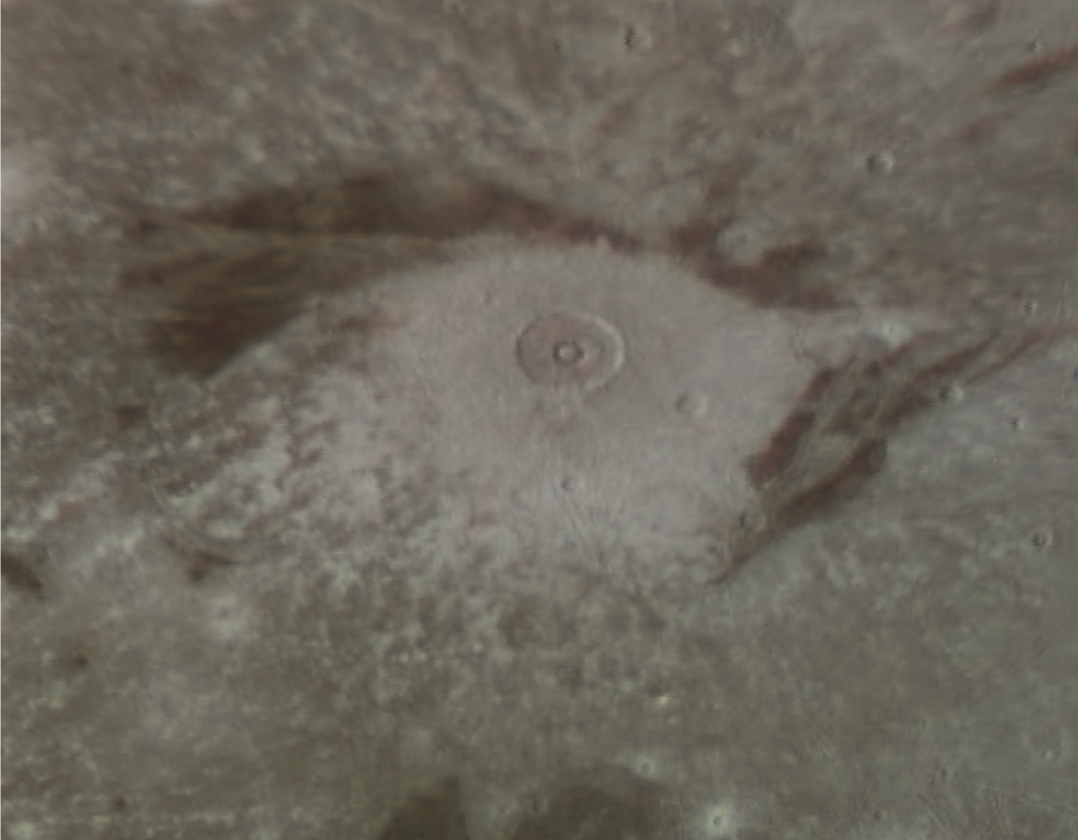
- An image of Hershef, taken by the Galileo space probe on 21 February 1997.
- Feature type: Bright ray dome crater
- Coordinates: 47.39°N 90.62°E
- Diameter: 120 kilometres (75 mi)
- Eponym: Hershef

Hershef is a major bright ray crater with a central dome in the northern hemisphere of Ganymede, Jupiter's largest moon. The crater's outer rim measures approximately 120 kilometres (75 mi) in diameter, while its rays extend outward for hundreds of kilometers in all directions.

== Naming ==
Hershef is named after a minor Egyptian god called Heryshaf, the god of strength and one of the guardian deities of the Nile. He is depicted as a ram-headed deity whose cult center, rulers, and followers were among the leading contenders in reunifying Egypt during the First Intermediate Period.

Some Ancient Greeks considered Heryshaf to be the equivalent of their demigod Heracles (Hercules in Latin) because both divinities were associated with great strength.

The name of the crater follows the International Astronomical Union's (IAU) naming convention, under which surface features and craters on Ganymede are named after deities, heroes, and places from Ancient Near Eastern mythology. Ancient Egyptian religion and mythology are considered part of the Ancient Near Eastern mythological tradition.

The name for Hershef was approved and adopted by the IAU in 2000.

== Location ==
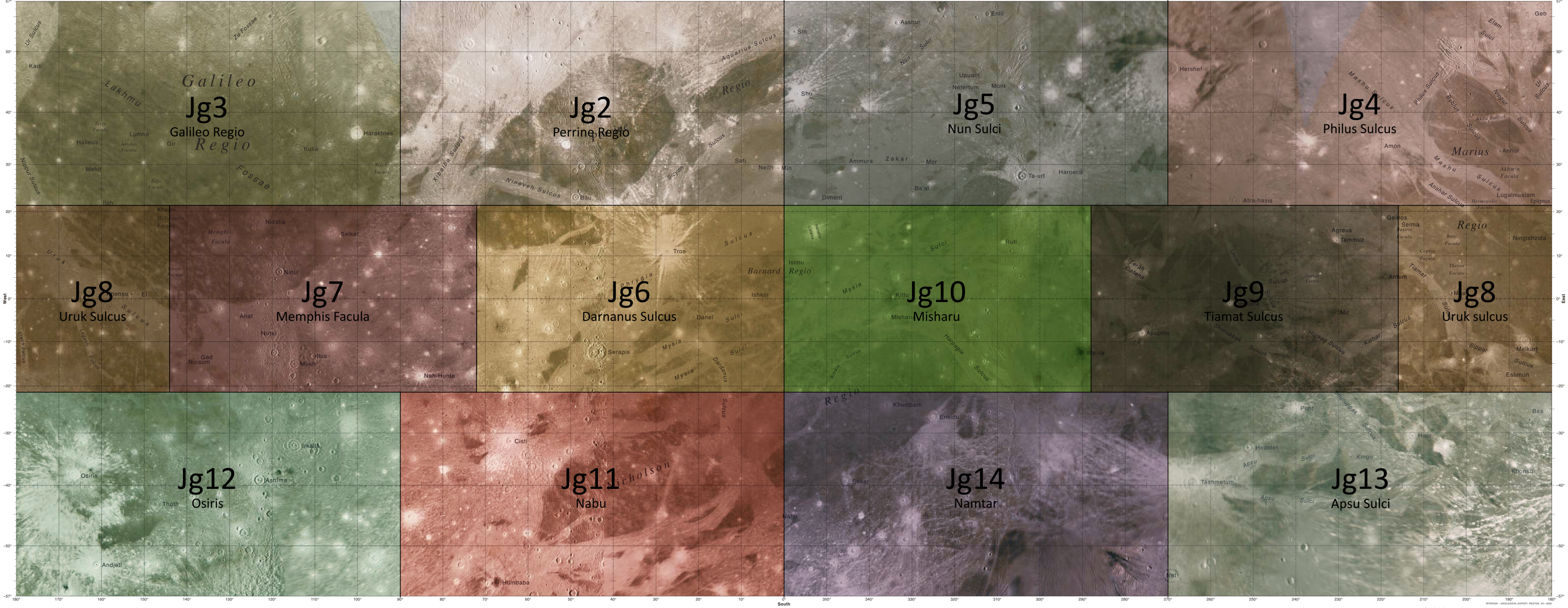
A map of Ganymede's quadrangles, showing the location of Hershef among them (between quadrangles Jg4 and Jg5).

Hershef is located in the northern hemisphere of Ganymede, on the moon's trailing hemisphere. It is surrounded by several other ray craters, although only two are named: Ta-urt and Haroeris. To its west lies the sprawling grooved terrain Nun Sulci, while to its northeast is the concentric crater Lagamal.

Hershef is lies between the boundary of the Philus Sulcus (designated Jg4) and Nun Sulci (designated Jg5) quadrangles of Ganymede.

Because Ganymede is in synchronous rotation as it orbits Jupiter, one hemisphere of the moon always faces its parent planet, while the other never does. Consequently, because Hershef is located almost exactly along the boundary between Ganymede's Jupiter-facing and anti-Jovian hemispheres, Jupiter would always appear low in the sky, near the horizon, as seen from the crater (Note: For moons in synchronous rotation, such as Ganymede, 0° longitude corresponds to the part of the surface that always faces Jupiter. Regions between 90° W and 270° W longitude never face the moon’s parent planet.)

== Characteristic and coloration ==
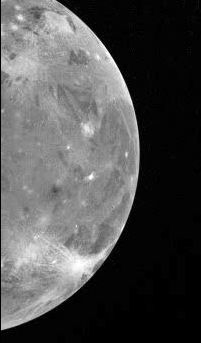
An image of the trailing hemisphere of Ganymede, taken by Galileo in February 1997. Hershef is at the top of the image.

Hershef is one of Ganymede's many bright ray craters pockmarking the moon's surface. It consists of a circular crater rim surrounding a central dome. The floor of the crater is filled with bright materials. The length of the ejecta of Hershef is also noticeably asymmetrical — the rays are longer in the southwestern direction compared to the northern and northeaster directions. The crater and its ejecta are also located on an ancient, dark terrain (called regio).

All these characteristics make Hershef similar to other major ray craters like Osiris. On the other hand, Hershef and other ray craters on the trailing hemisphere of Ganymede are noticeably darker than ray craters on the leading hemisphere, including Osiris. Using Galileo's Near Infrared Mapping Spectrometer (NIMS), planetary scientists found out that Hershef's spectrum differs from Osiris. Hershef has much lower reflectance beyond 3 μm. This indicates larger-grained water ice compared with Osiris, whose surface is dominated by finer-grained ice. The difference is probably due to the trailing hemisphere environment. Planetary scientists argue that Hershef's darker infrared appearance is probably not because it is older, but because it lies on Ganymede's trailing hemisphere, where charged-particle bombardment (sputtering) modifies the ice.

On the other hand, according to research done by Shoemaker et al., Hershef's darker shade is an indication that it is slightly older than Osiris.

== Morphology and natural history ==
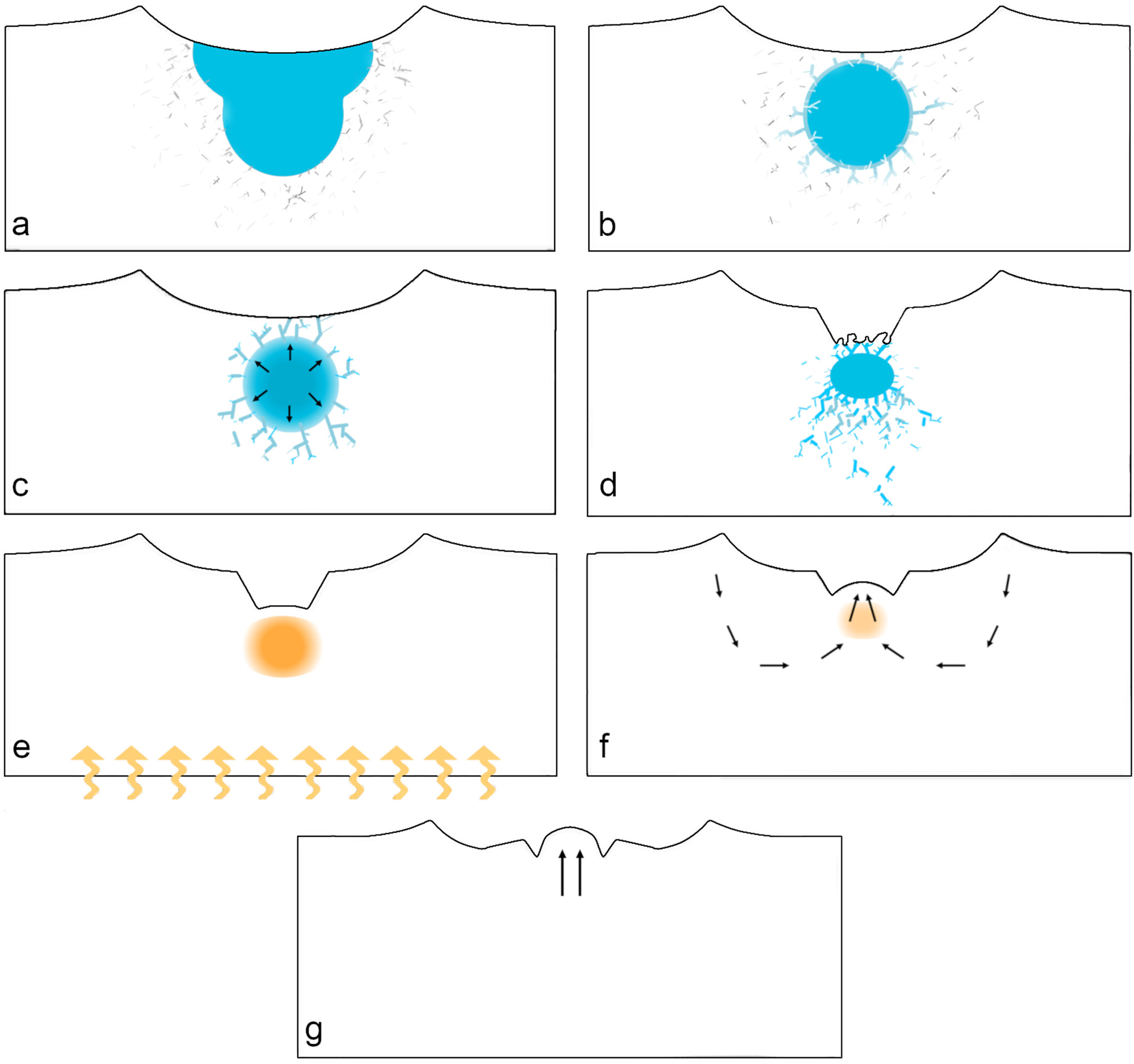
A diagram showing the steps in the formation of dome craters on icy moons. It shows how the refreezing of meltwater from meteorite impacts can cause both the formation of sinkholes and the dome-forming expansion of an icy crust.

Hershef is one of Ganymede's many dome craters. Research suggest that the formation of the crater's dome was caused by meltwater that formed under crater as the heat generated by the asteroid impact melted the moon's icy surface. As the meltwater refroze, it caused cracks and damages to form beneath the crater, which led to the collapse of the crater's central part and the formation of a circular pit. Then, as more meltwater continued to freeze, it expanded since water expands when it freezes, pushing up the center of the crater and creating an icy dome, and turning the circular pit into a circular trench. Compared to similar but older dome-type craters such as Neith, younger ray craters like Hershef have brighter rays because their ray deposits have not yet been erased by space weathering. Domes usually only form if a crater is more than 60 kilometers wide.

== Exploration ==
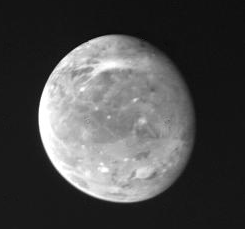
Ganymede's trailing hemisphere, imaged by Voyager 1 in March 1979, a few days before its closest approach to the Jovian system. North is at the bottom of this image. Hershef is the bright ray crater at the bottom.

Voyager 1 became the first spacecraft to observe and photograph Hershef crater from a great distance as it approached Ganymede in March 1979, about three days before its closest approach. However, by the time of Voyager 1's closest approach to Ganymede, Hershef had already moved into Ganymede's night side, preventing the spacecraft from obtaining high-resolution images of the crater.

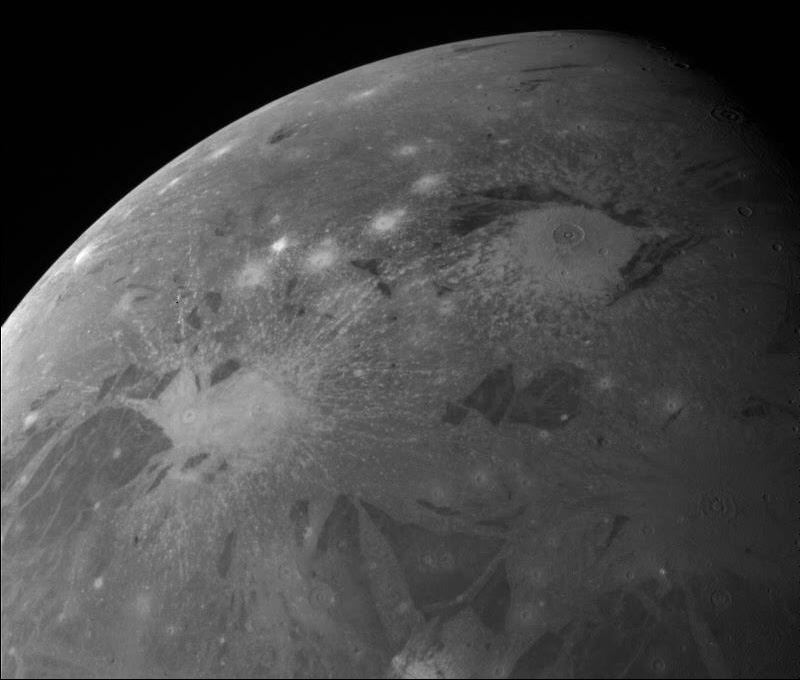
An image of Ganymede's northern hemisphere, showing the crater Hershef (upper right from the center). This images was taken by Galileo in February 1997. The other rays craters in the image are Ta-urt and Haroeris (left from the center).

As of 2026, only one space probe has imaged Hershef from a moderate distance: the Galileo space probe. Galileo imaged Hershef at moderate resolution during its flyby of Ganymede in February 1997. However, compared with other major ray craters on Ganymede, such as Tros and Osiris, Hershef remains relatively understudied and underexplored.

=== Future missions ===
The European Space Agency's (ESA) Jupiter Icy Moons Explorer (Juice) orbiter, which was launched in April 2023, is scheduled to arrive at Jupiter in July 2031. After spending approximately three and a half years orbiting Jupiter and performing multiple flybys of Europa, Callisto, and Ganymede, Juice will enter a low polar orbit around Ganymede at an altitude of approximately 500 kilometres (310 mi) above the moon's surface. From this orbit, the spacecraft may obtain higher-resolution images of Hershef, potentially helping planetary scientists better understand why its rays are darker than those of other ray craters.

== See also ==
- List of craters on Ganymede
- Meteor
