= Zakar (crater) =

Crater on Ganymede

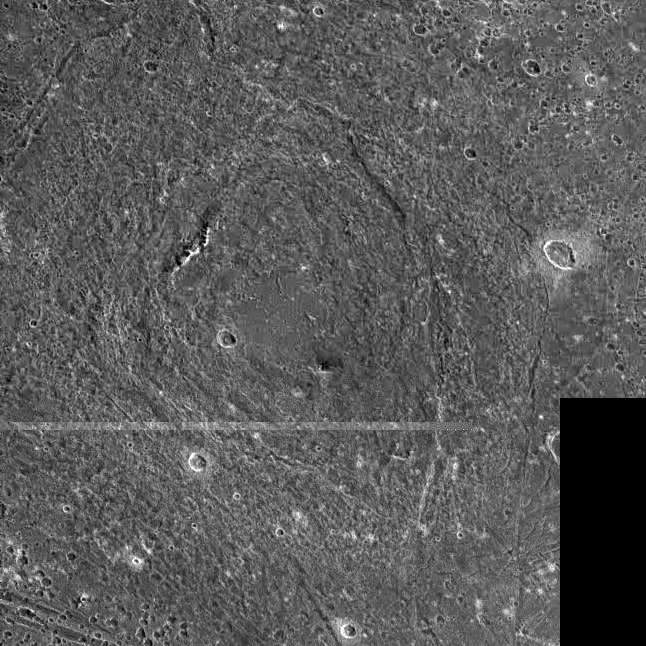
- A mosaic image of Zakar crater, taken by the Galileo space probe on 5 April 1997.
- Feature type: Ghost Crater
- Coordinates: 31.28°N 333.67°W
- Diameter: 170 kilometres (110 mi)
- Eponym: Zakar

Zakar is an ancient ghost crater—a heavily degraded crater—on the surface of Ganymede, the largest moon of Jupiter. The crater is about 170 kilometres (110 mi) across, although most of its structure has been thoroughly eroded and degraded, making it extremely difficult to see.

== Naming ==
According to the International Astronomical Union (IAU), the organization responsible for formally naming astronomical bodies and their surface features, Zakar is named after a god who is considered the chief deity of the Assyrian pantheon. However, the supreme deity of the ancient Assyrians was Asshur, and Zakar was instead the god of dreams who conveyed messages from the gods to humans through dreams.

This name was chosen in line with the convention that craters on Ganymede should be named after deities, heroes and places from Ancient Middle Eastern mythology like Assyrian and Mesopotamian mythologies. The name Zakar was approved by the IAU in 1997.

Another crater on Ganymede, Zaqar, likely shares the same intended namesake.

== Location ==
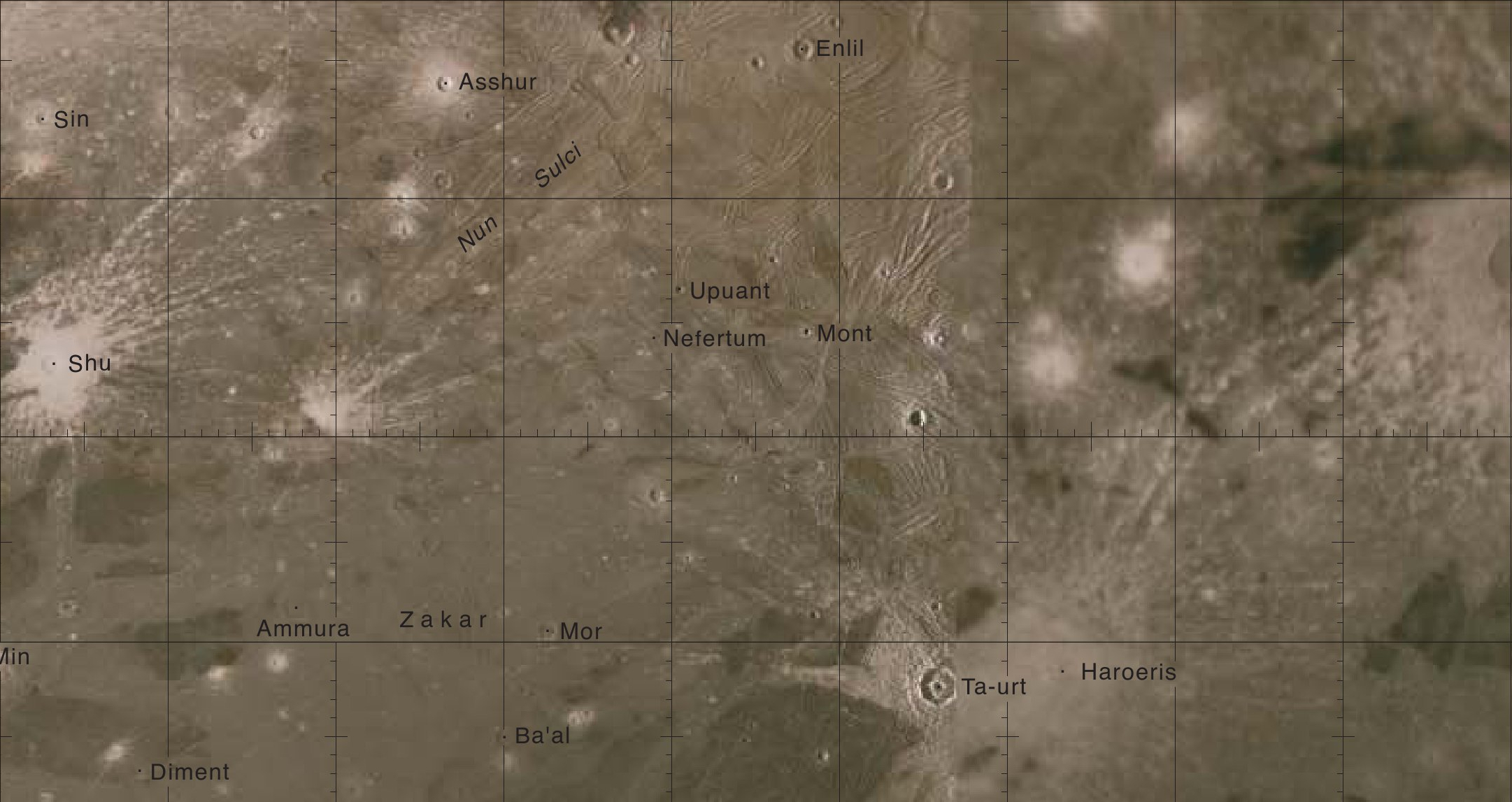
The Nun Sulci quadrangle on Ganymede, showing the location of Zakar.

Zakar is located within the southern limits of a bright, grooved terrain on Ganymede known as Nun Sulci. The ghost crater is surrounded by only a handful of more well-defined craters such as Ammura to the west, Mor to the east, and Ba'al to the southeast.

Zakar is situated within the Nun Sulci quadrangle of Ganymede (designated Jg5). This quadrangle is named after the grooved terrain that contains Zakar.

== Morphology ==
Due to the degradation it has experienced since ancient times, most parts of Zakar crater have been reduced to undulating plains. Only faint traces of its original concentric structures can still be seen. Based on a simple photoclinometric model, it suggests that Zakar was domically uplifted by approximately 2 kilometres (1.2 mi) during its history. However, higher-resolution images of the crater taken by Galileo have shown that this central dome is an illusion caused by albedo reflection, and the central region of Zakar is actually a lower-elevation unit.

== Geology and Age ==
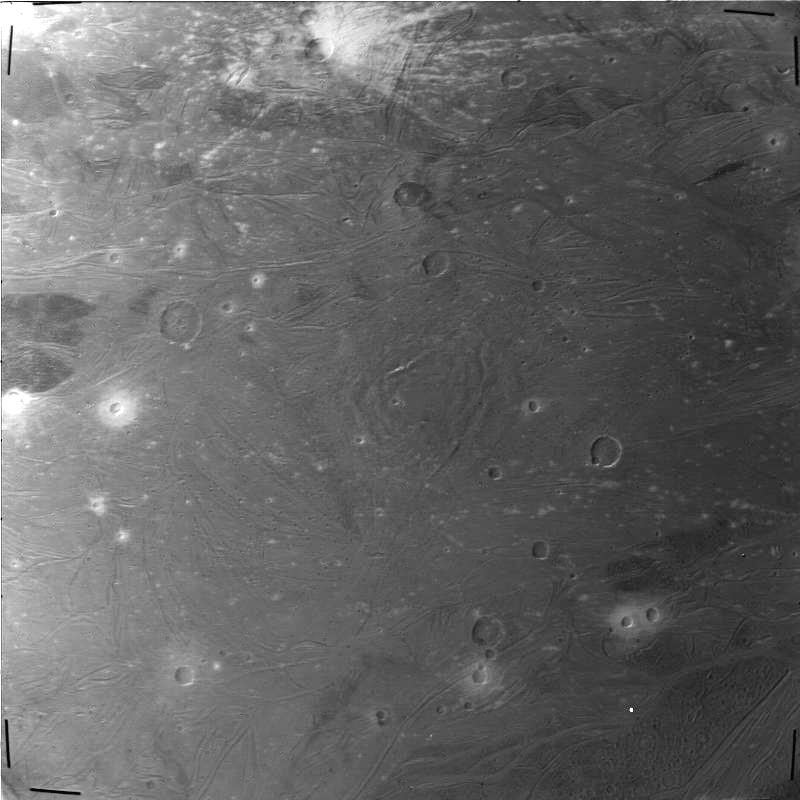
An image of Ganymede's surface, centered on Zakar, taken by Voyager 1 in March 1979. The ghost crater is barely visible in the image.

It is notable that when penepalimpsests, such as ghost craters like Zakar, are located near or on Ganymede's bright terrain, their ejecta deposits and secondary craters overlap. Thus, it is highly probable that ghost craters postdate the bright terrain containing the ancient craters. Bright terrains on Ganymede, including Nun Sulci which contain Zakar, represent sections of the moon's surface that have been renewed and overprinted by fresh water ice rising from beneath the moon's crust. Zakar may be the last remnant of a very old crater that has already been mostly erased by the newer Nun Sulci.

However, superposed crater densities are very similar to those of Ganymede's bright terrains, suggesting that these structures are either just coincidental with the bright terrain, or it slightly postdates bright terrain. This discrepancy is probably due to the inherit limitation of using crater-counting method.

Zakar is considered an interesting geological feature to study because it likely represents a late stage in the evolution of craters on Ganymede, in which a crater is nearly destroyed by tectonic activity on the moon.

== Exploration ==
Voyager 1 was the first spacecraft to photograph Zakar during its flyby of Ganymede in March 1979. The probe took medium-resolution images of Ganymede, but the ghost crater is so badly degraded that it is difficult to discern even in mid-resolution images. A close-up image was required to discern the details of the crater.

Galileo was able to image Zakar in great detail as it orbited around Jupiter from December 1995 to September 2003. During a targeted flyby in April 1997, the probe captured a mosaic image of the ghost crater. As of 2026, this mosaic image of Zakar by Galileo makes it the only detailed image of the ghost crater.

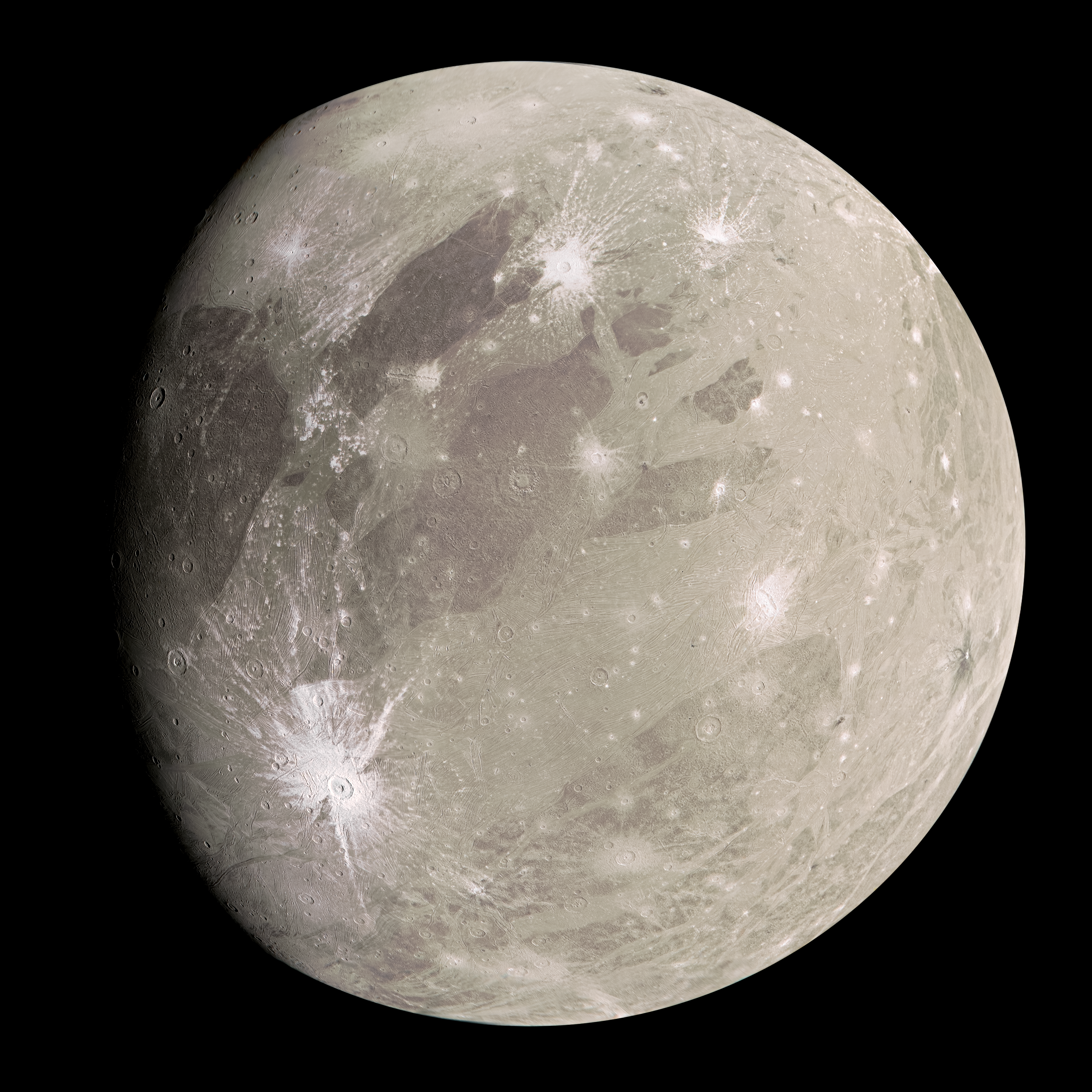
A composite image of Ganymede, barely showing Zakar in the upper right very close to the limb of the moon. This image was taken by the Juno spacecraft in June 2021, during its 34th close approach to Jupiter.

The most recent mission to image Zakar was the Juno mission in June 2021. During its 34th perijove (its closest approach to Jupiter during an orbit), the spacecraft flew by Ganymede to adjust and shorten its orbit around Jupiter. Juno managed to image the ghost crater but Zakar was too close to the limb of the planet, which means not much details could be discerned from its images.

=== Future Mission ===
The European Space Agency (ESA) is sending a new space probe to Jupiter called the Jupiter Icy Moons Explorer (Juice). The probe is scheduled to arrive at Jupiter in July 2031 and it will perform multiple flybys of Europa, Callisto and Ganymede. After those flybys, Juice is expected to settle into a low orbit around Ganymede at a distance of just 500 kilometres (310 mi) in July 2034. Because Zakar is extremely difficult to observe and image from afar, Juice's close-up images are expected to reveal more information about the ghost crater's morphology and evolution, potentially allowing planetary scientists to piece together the broader history of cratering and resurfacing on Ganymede.

== See also ==
- List of craters on Ganymede
- Meteor
