= Nefertum (crater) =

Crater on Ganymede

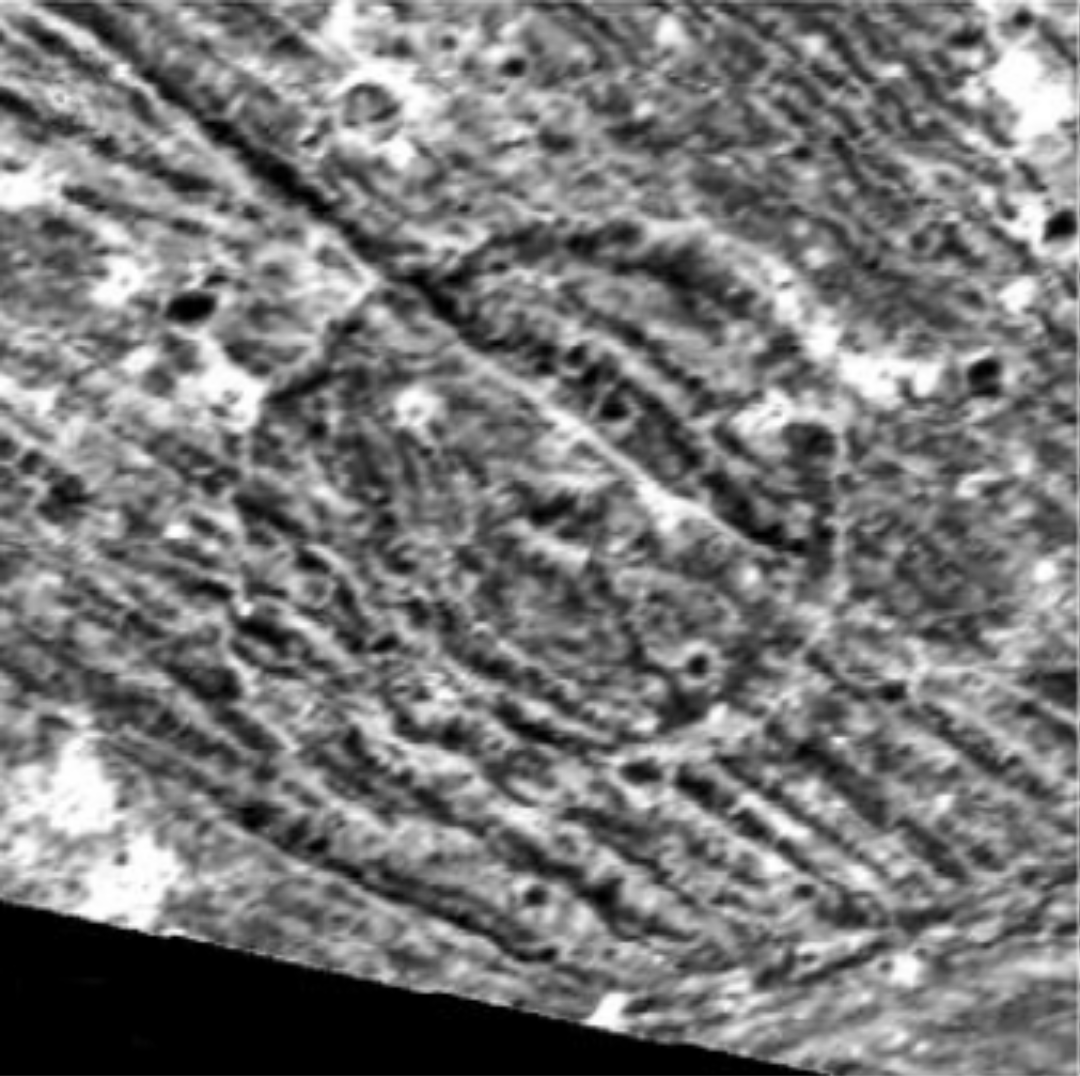
- A mosaic image of Nefertum, taken by the Galileo space probe on 5 April 1997.
- Feature type: Strained Crater
- Coordinates: 44.35°N 321.04°W
- Diameter: 29 kilometres (18 mi)
- Eponym: Nefertum

Nefertum is a small, heavily deformed crater on Ganymede, the largest moon of Jupiter. The crater is relatively small with a diameter of only about approximately 29 kilometres (18 mi).

== Naming ==
Nefertum is named after Nefertum, the ancient Egyptian god of beauty and perfumes. His name means "The beautiful one", which reflects his role as the divine standard of beauty. He was the son of the god Ptah, the god of arts and creation who was the chief god of the ancient Egyptian city of Memphis, and Sekhmet, the lion-headed goddess of war. Nefertum became a very important Egyptian god when the city of his father became the capital of Egypt for many centuries.

Nefertum's naming follows the convention that was set by the International Astronomical Union (IAU), which states that craters on Ganymede should be named after deities, heroes, or places from Ancient Middle Eastern mythology, such as Egyptian mythology.

The IAU approved the name for Nefertum in 1997.

== Location ==
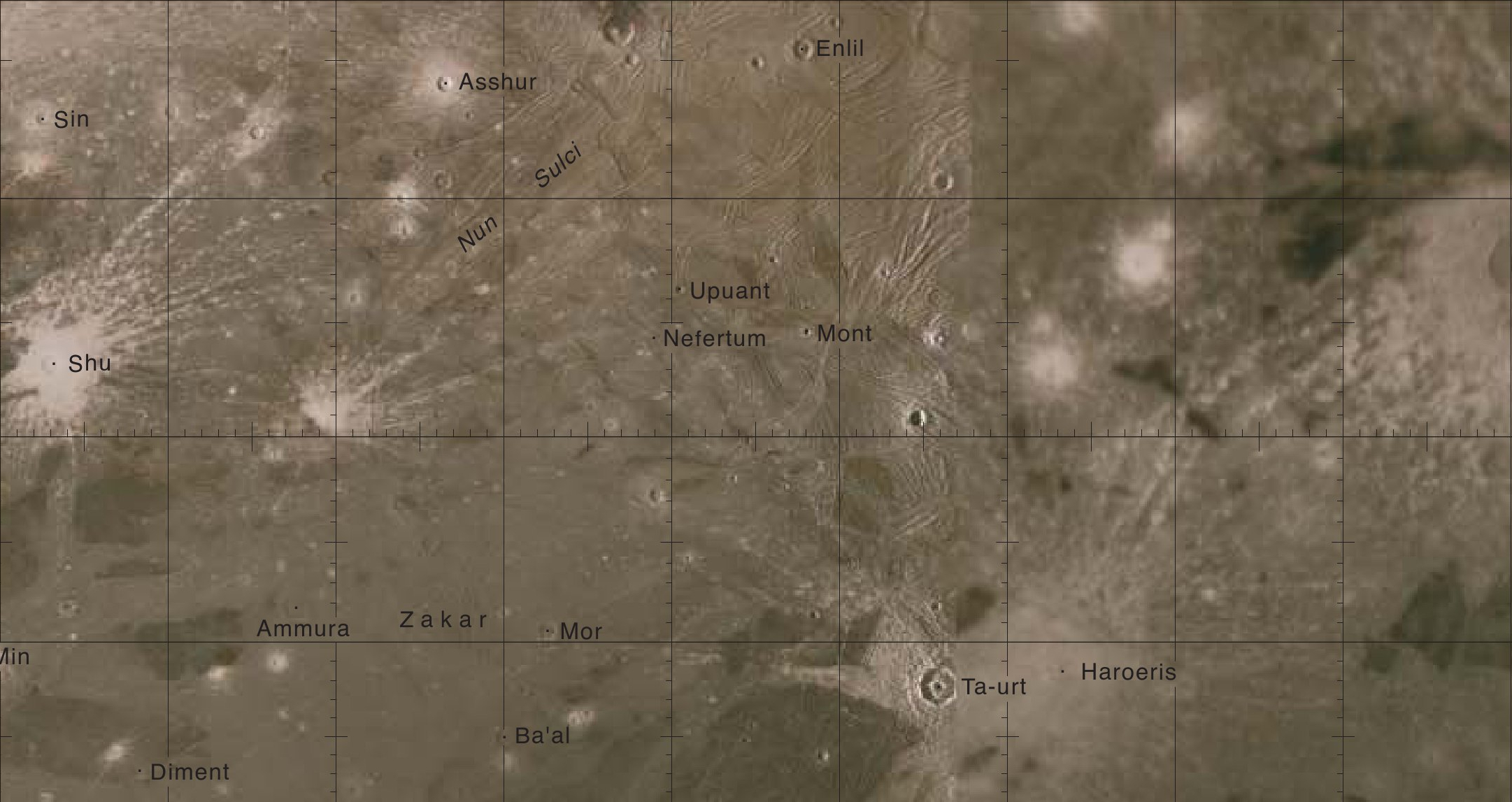
The Nun Sulci quadrangle on Ganymede, showing the location of Nefertum crater.

Nefertum is located within a bright, grooved-terrain area on Ganymede called Nun Sulci. The crater is surrounded by hundreds of crisscrossing sinuous grooves, some of which crosses right into the interior of Nefertum, deforming the rim and floor of the crater. To Nefertum's north is another crater called Upuant, while to its east is Mont.

Nefertum is situated in the middle of the Nun Sulci quadrangle (i.e. section) of Ganymede (designated Jg5). This quadrangle is named after the grooved terrain that contains Nefertum.

In addition, the crater is located on the hemisphere of Ganymede that always faces Jupiter. This situation is a result of the moon's synchronous rotation during its orbit around its parent planet. Therefore, an observer at Nefertum would always see Jupiter fixed in the sky. (Note: For moons in synchronous rotation, such as Ganymede, 0° longitude corresponds to the part of the surface that always faces Jupiter. Regions between 90° W to 0° to 270° W longitude always face the moon's parent planet.)

== Morphology ==
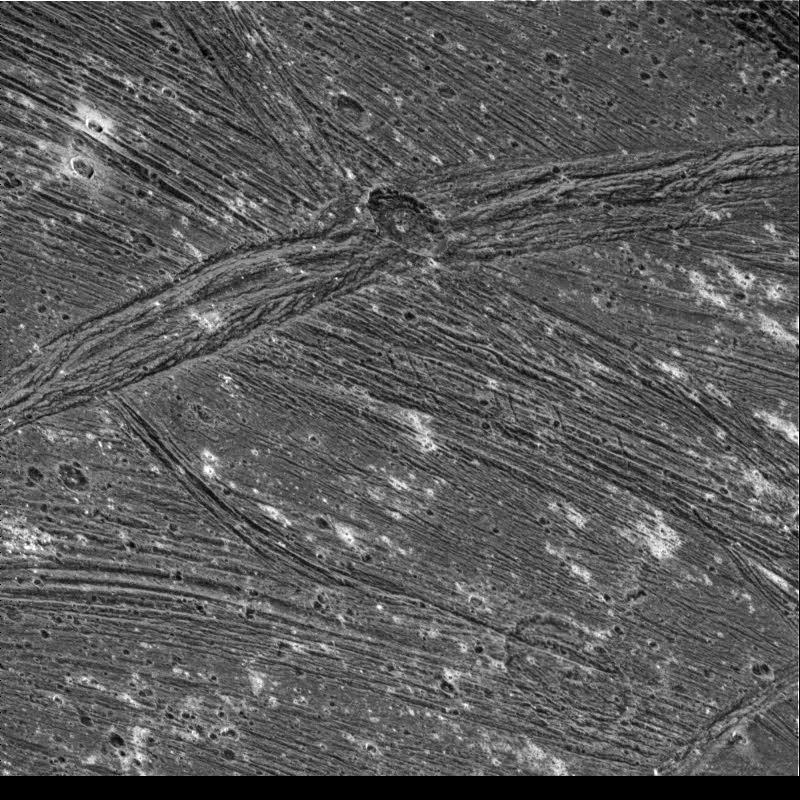
An image of Nun Sulci, showing how the sulci's ridges have extensively deformed Nefertum (lower right), taken by Galileo in April 1997. The crater slightly above the center is Upuant.

Nefertum is approximately elliptical in shape. Analysis of Galileo imagery indicates the presences of left-handed horizontal shear along narrow, east–west–trending zones that cut across the surrounding region. However, Nefertum itself appears to have been primarily deformed by northwest-trending faults that predate the younger, cross-cutting shear zones. The crater has undergone pervasive, distributed deformation associated with right-lateral strike-slip extension within Nun Sulci.

Overall, Nefertum is estimated to have been elongated by approximately 15%, largely as a result of extensional strain. This value represents a lower bound to the amount of strain that a crater may experience before it begins to become unrecognizable. Deformation is most pronounced along the crater’s southwestern rim, where concentrated extension has altered the rim nearly beyond recognition. The ratio of extensional stretching to shear strain experienced by the Nefertum is considered average relative to other more-strained and less-strained craters on Ganymede.

Other prominent examples of craters that have experienced extensive rifting and extensional strain include Erichthonius and Saltu.

== Geology ==
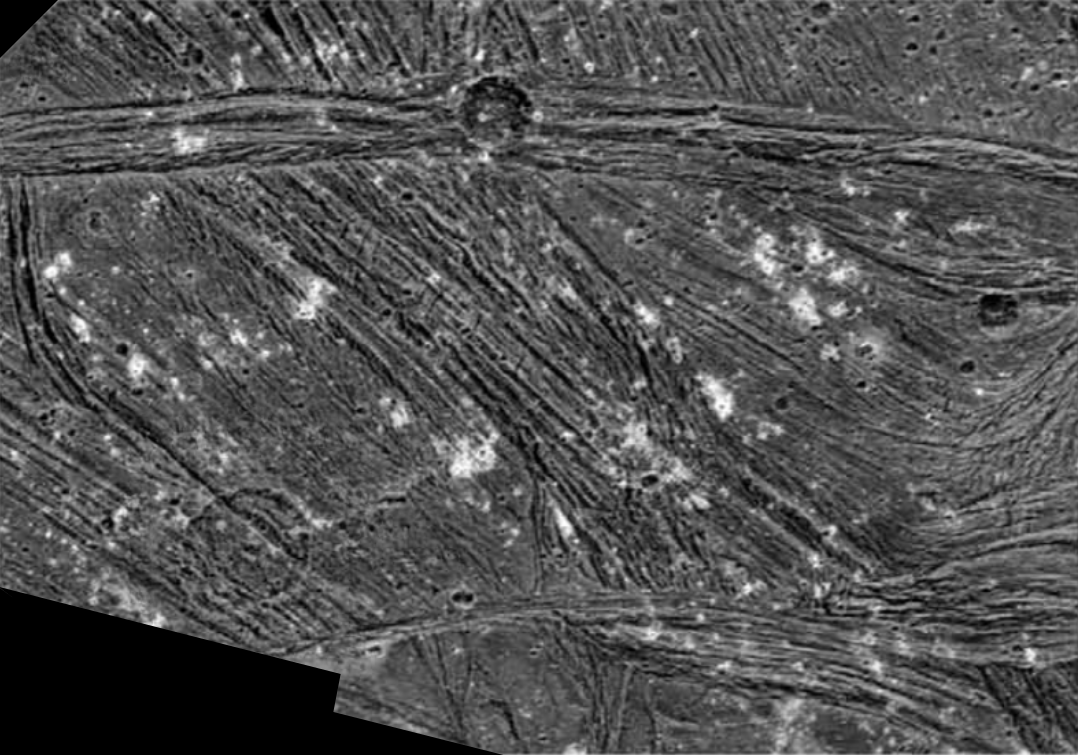
A mosaic image of Nefertum (lower left) and the surrounding region, taken by Galileo in April 1997. The crater at the top is Upuant

Nefertum is a crater that has been heavily modified by past, and possibly ongoing, tectonic activity on Ganymede. The same tectonic processes that formed the smoother, grooved terrain of Nun Sulci also significantly damaged Nefertum.

Bright terrains on Ganymede like Nun Sulci, which contains Nefertum, represent sections of the moon's surface where old surfaces have been renewed and overprinted by fresh water ice welling up from beneath the moon's crust. Nefertum may be on its way to being completely erased by the younger Nun Sulci in the distant future.

== Exploration ==
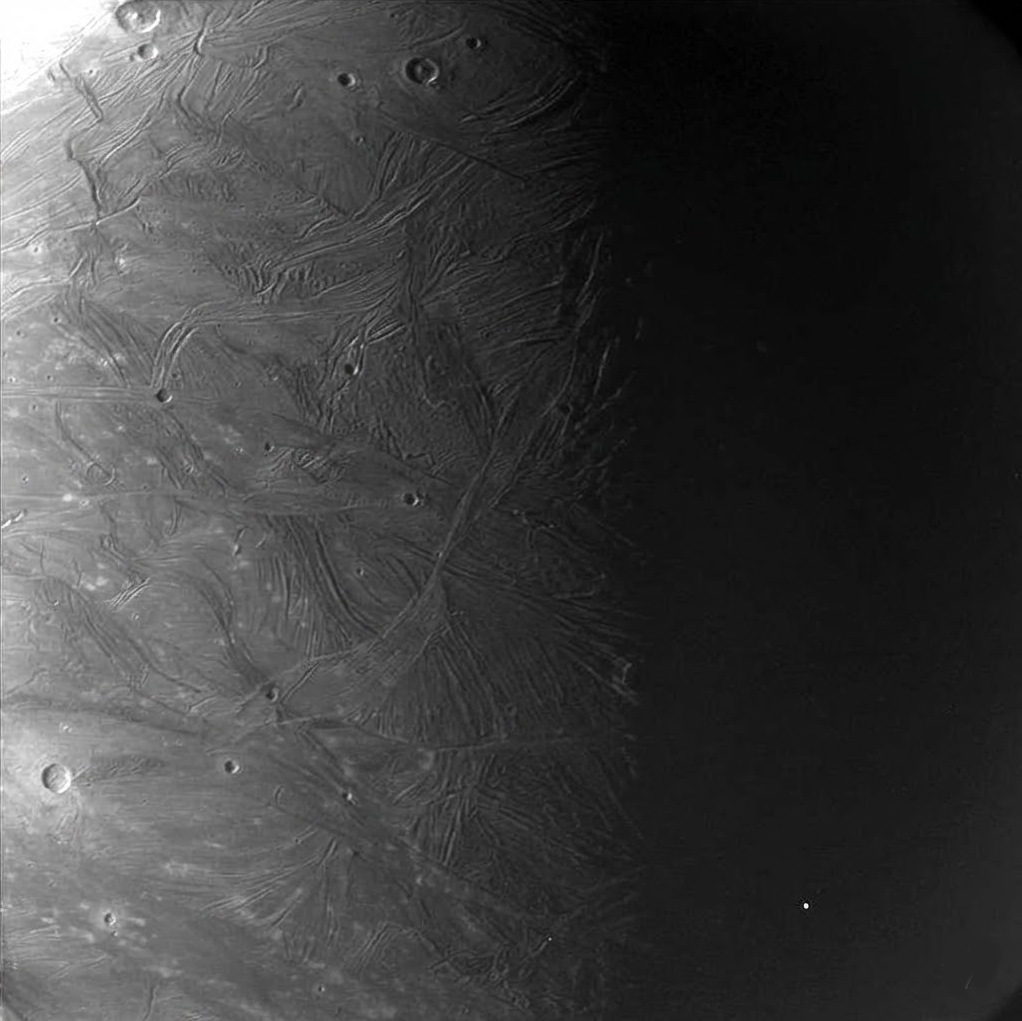
An image of Nun Sulci, taken by Voyager 1 in March 1979. Nefertum is the barely visible crater located near the center-left edge of the image.

Voyager 1 was the first spacecraft to image Nefertum during its flyby of Ganymede in March 1979. The spacecraft was able to capture images of Nefertum from a medium distance. Because Nefertum is relatively small and because Voyager 1 did not fly close to Ganymede, it could only capture a low-resolution image of the strained crater within the grooves of the extensive Nun Sulci.

The Galileo probe became the next and, as of 2026, last probe to observe Nefertum when it orbited around Jupiter from December 1995 to September 2003. The probe was able to take a few close-up mosaic images of the strained crater during its G7 flyby in April 1997, and these image remain the only available high-resolution image of Nefertum to date. Galileo imaged Nefertum and the surrounding Nun Sulci at a resolution of 164 m/pixel. This observation is particularly important, as it represents the only time Galileo captured a strained crater within a bright terrain on Ganymede, rather than within a dark one.

=== Future Missions ===
The European Space Agency's (ESA) Jupiter Icy Moons Explorer (Juice), which was launched in April 2023, is scheduled to arrive at Jupiter in July 2031. In 2034, Juice is will settle into a low orbit around Ganymede at a distance of just 500 kilometres (310 mi) in July 2034. The probe is expected to send super clear images of Nefertum which can help planetary scientists better understand the evolution of craters on Ganymede as they undergo modification and destruction due to tectonic activities.

== See also ==
- List of craters on Ganymede
- Meteor
