= Ta-urt (crater) =

Crater on Ganymede

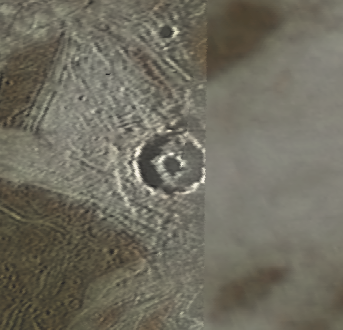
- A composite image of Ta-urt crater, made by combining images that were taken by Voyager 1 on 5 March 1979 (left), and the Galileo space probe on February 21, 1997 (right).
- Feature type: Bright ray concentric crater (also Double rim crater)
- Coordinates: 27.66°N 304.20°W
- Diameter: 94 kilometres (58 mi) or 98 kilometres (61 mi)
- Eponym: Tawaret (also called Ta-urt)

Ta-urt is a major crater in the northern hemisphere of Jupiter's largest moon Ganymede. It is a concentric crater with a pit in the middle and two crater rims, with the smaller rim being completely inside the bigger one. The crater's inner rim is approximately 37 kilometres (23 mi) wide, while its outer rim is approximately 94 kilometres (58 mi) wide. (or 98 kilometres (61 mi) according other sources).

== Naming ==
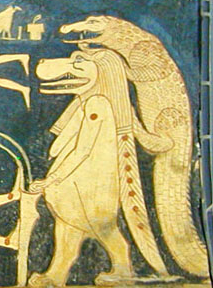
Ta-urt as an Ancient Egyptian constellation on the astronomical ceiling of the tomb of Pharaoh Seti I.

Ta-urt is named after the important Egyptian goddess Tawaret (also called Ta-urt), the goddess of childbirth and protection. She was depicted with the head and body of a bipedal Nile hippopotamus and the claws of a lioness. She was believed to be one of the deities primarily responsible for protecting mothers and their babies during childbirth. The Ancient Egyptians often invoked her to protect their homes and families from harm and evil spirits. She was also believed to grant fertility to couples wishing to have children.

The name was approved by the International Astronomical Union (IAU) in 1988.

The crater's name follows the IAU's convention of naming geological features and craters on Ganymede after deities, heroes and places from Ancient Middle Eastern mythologies, including Egyptian mythology and beliefs.

== Location ==
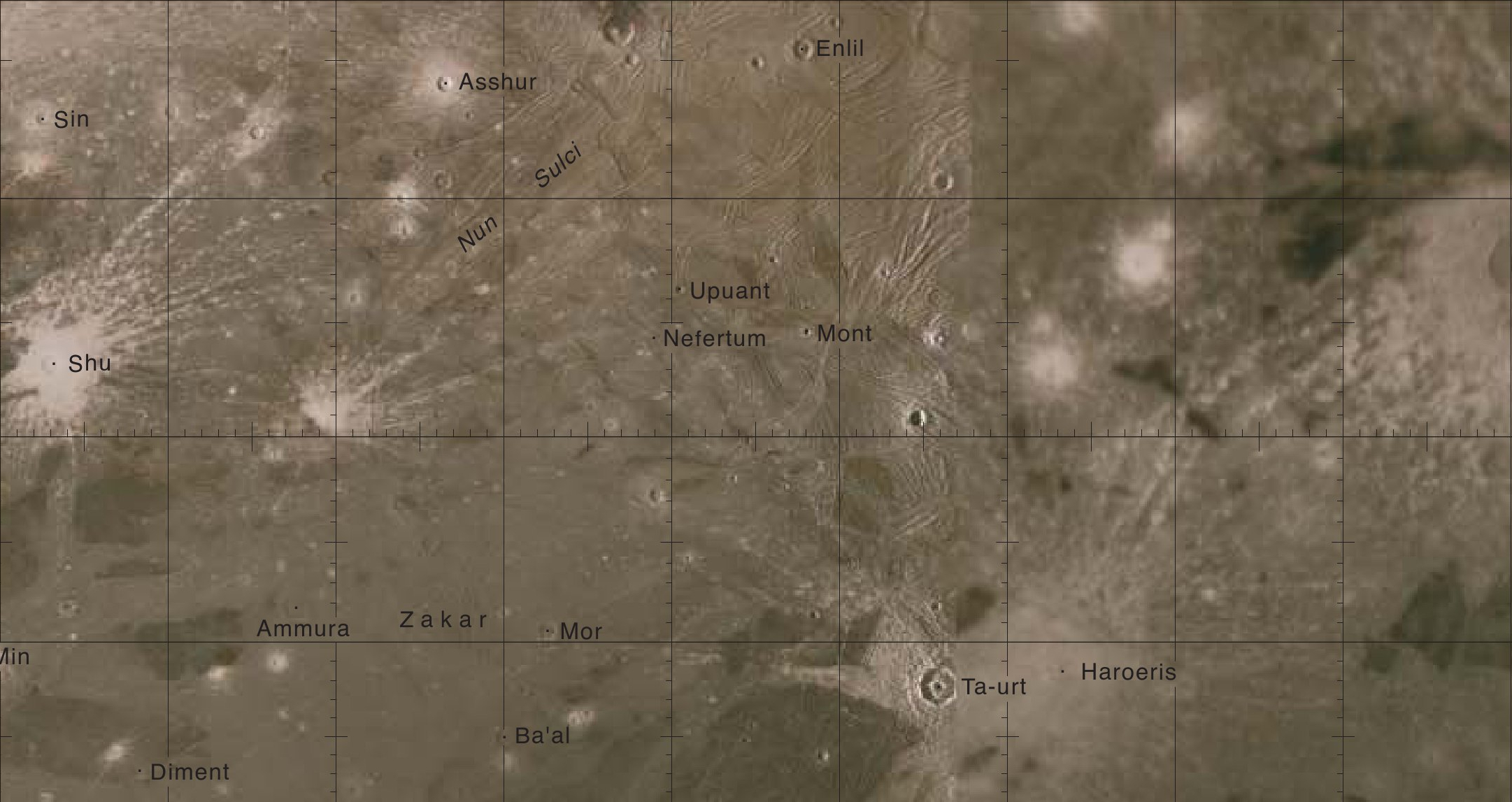
The Nun Sulci quadrangle on Ganymede, showing the location of Ta-urt crater.

Ta-urt is located in the southeastern corner of Nun Sulci, a sprawling groove terrain on Ganymede consisting of several crisscrossing grooves. Ta-urt is close to several bright ray craters such as Haroeris to the east and Hershef further to the northeast.

The crater lies within the Nun Sulci quadrangle (designated Jg5) of Ganymede.

Ta-urt is located on the hemisphere of Ganymede that always faces Jupiter. This is due to the moon's synchronous rotation, which keeps one hemisphere constantly pointed toward its parent planet as it orbits. This means that an observer at Ta-urt would always see Jupiter in the sky. (Note: For moons in synchronous rotation, such as Ganymede, 0° longitude corresponds to the part of the surface that always faces Jupiter. Regions between 90° W to 0° to 270° W longitude always face the moon's parent planet.)

== Morphology and Coloration ==
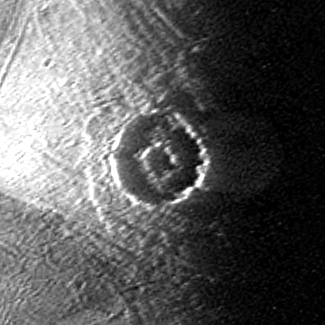
The crater Ta-urt on Ganymede.

Ta-urt consists of an inner rim approximately 37 kilometres (23 mi) in diameter and an outer rim measuring 94 kilometres (58 mi) to 98 kilometres (61 mi) across. It is also classified as a bright ray crater. Bright ray craters on Ganymede's trailing hemisphere, such as Ta-urt, are noticeably darker than comparable bright ray craters on the moon's leading hemisphere, such as the prominent Osiris. Earlier studies by planetary scientists such as Shoemaker et al. suggested that Ta-urt is darker and therefore older than Osiris.

However, measurements by Galileo's Near Infrared Mapping Spectrometer (NIMS) found that Ta-urt's spectrum differs from that of Osiris. The reflectance spectra of Ta-urt and other trailing-hemisphere ray craters, such as Hershef and Tashmetum, exhibit very low reflectance at wavelengths longer than 3 microns, indicating larger water-ice grain sizes than those observed at Osiris. The ice grains at Ta-urt are therefore coarser than those at Osiris, and its spectral signature is consistent with radiation processing of the moon's surface. These spectral differences are probably caused by the trailing-hemisphere environment, where sputtering by energetic charged particles is more effective and more likely to produce coarser ice.

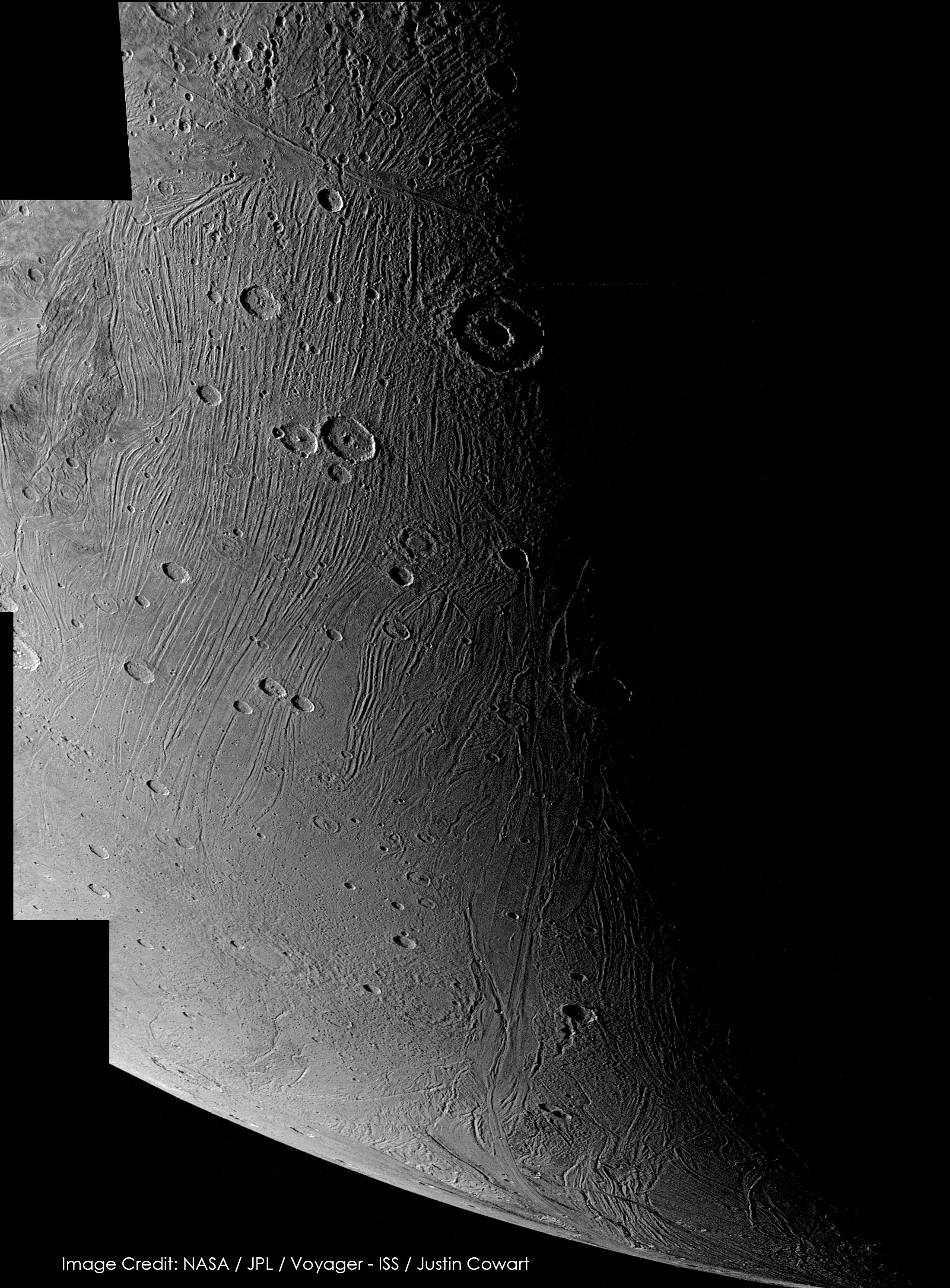
An image showing Anubis crater near Ganymede's terminator. Anubis' structure closely resembles that of Ta-urt crater.

Ta-urt's shape and morphology greatly resemble that of another concentric crater on Ganymede called Anubis, which is located at the south pole of the moon. Anubis lacks the bright rays that Ta-urt possesses, however.

== Exploration ==
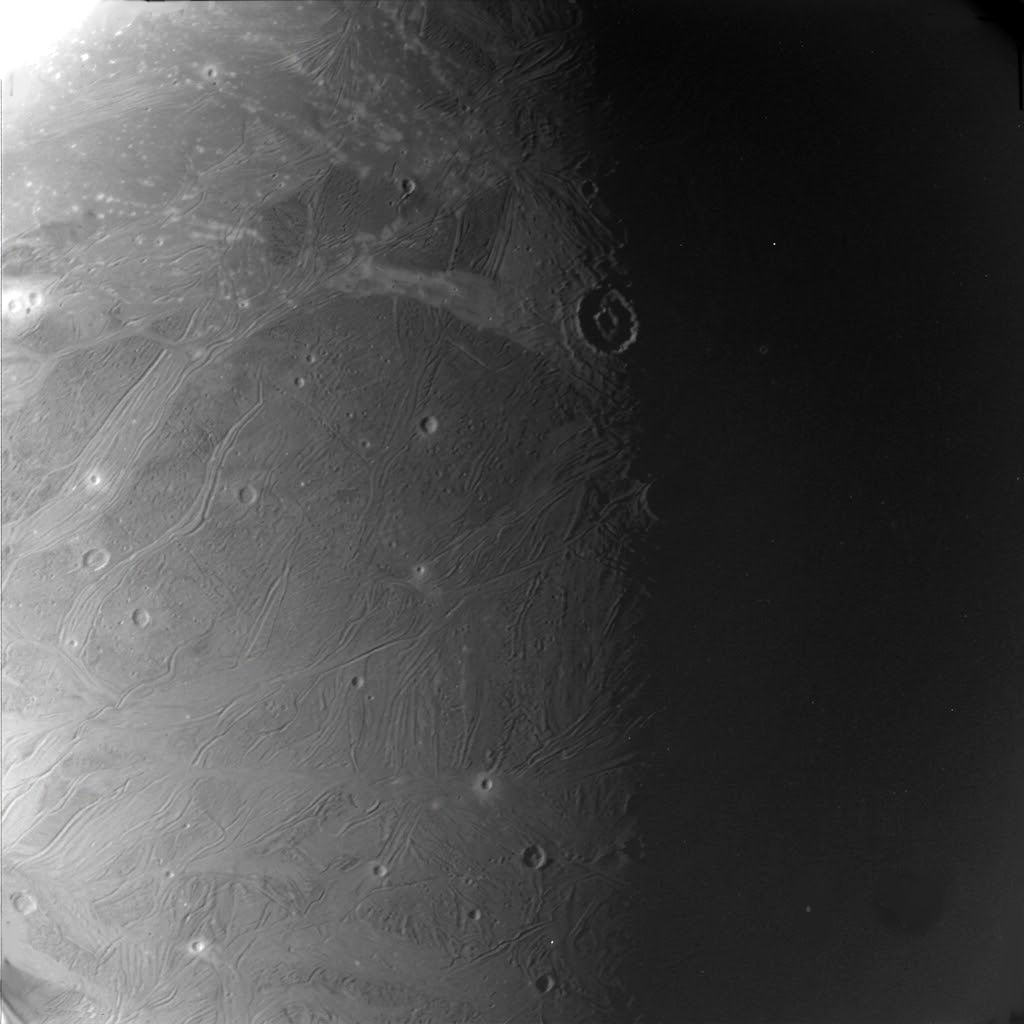
An image of Ta-urt on Ganymede, taken by Voyager 1 in March 1979. Ta-urt's double rim is clearly visible because the crater is at the terminator of moon when this image was taken.

Voyager 1 became the first spacecraft to explore and image Ta-urt when it flew by Ganymede in March 1979. The crater was near the moon's terminator when the probe took photographs, allowing it to be seen in great relief. However, because of this positioning, much of the eastern side of the crater was also in darkness, resulting in an incomplete image of Ta-urt. As of 2026, Voyager 1's images of Ta-urt remain the best available, surpassing even those acquired by the later Galileo orbiter.

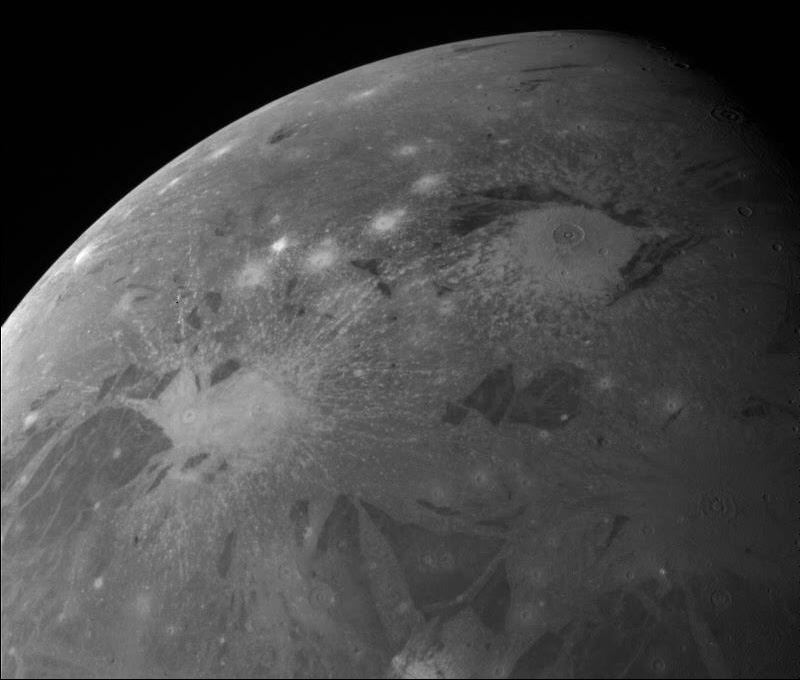
An image of Ganymede's northern hemisphere, showing the crater Ta-urt (bright crater at the left). This images was taken by Galileo in February 1997. The other rays craters in the image are Hershef (upper right) and Haroeris.

Galileo became the most recent spacecraft to image Ta-urt when it visited Ganymede in February 1997. During this flyby, the entirety of Ta-urt was illuminated by sunlight, allowing Galileo to capture images of the previously unseen eastern half of the crater. However, the probe was also much farther from Ganymede during this flyby, resulting in images with a lower resolution than those acquired by Voyager 1.

=== Future missions ===
The European Space Agency's (ESA) Jupiter Icy Moons Explorer (Juice) orbiter is scheduled to arrive at Jupiter in July 2031. After spending around three and a half years in orbit around Jupiter and performing multiple flybys of the icy moons Europa, Callisto and Ganymede, Juice will settle into a low polar orbit around Ganymede, allowing the probe to obtain higher-resolution images of Ta-urt. These new images could be used to replace the lower-resolution portions of the existing map of the crater.

== See also ==
- List of craters on Ganymede
- Meteor
