= Nun Sulci =

Bright region on Ganymede

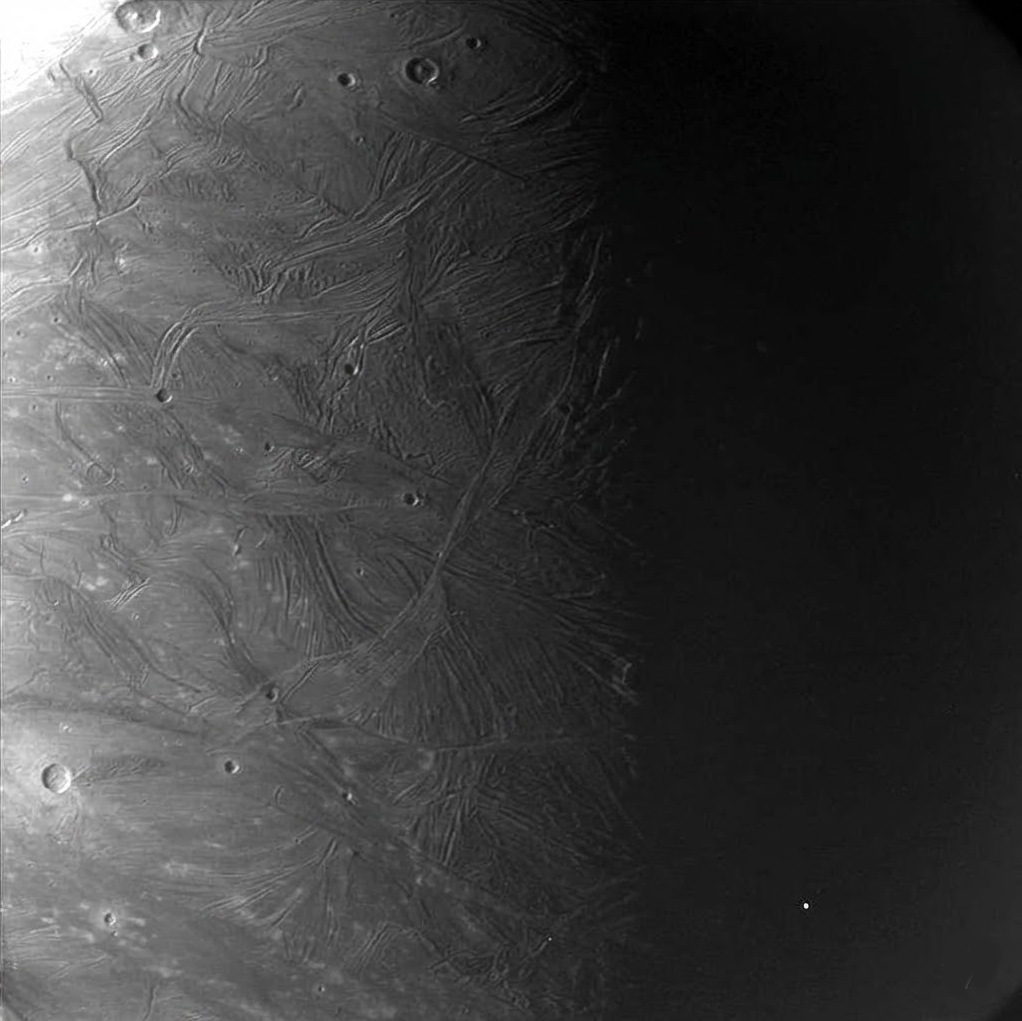
- An image Nun Sulci, taken by the Voyager 1 on March 6 1979. The big crater at the top is Enlil
- Feature type: Sulcus
- Location: Ganymede, Jupiter
- Coordinates: 49°30′N 316°24′W
- Length: 1,500 km (930 mi)
- Eponym: Nun

Nun Sulci is a massive, sprawling region of crisscrossing grooved terrain on Jupiter's largest moon Ganymede. It is populated by a handful of craters that were deformed by the tectonic processes that created its sulci.

== Naming ==
Nun Sulci is named after Nun, the Ancient Egyptian personification of chaos that existed before the world began and before order was established. The Ancient Egyptians believed that, in the beginning, the world was once an endless ocean of chaos (personified by Nun) until the sun god Ra emerged from its waters, bringing the first light to the world and establishing order in the cosmos. The name of Nun Sulci follows the naming convention of the International Astronomical Union (IAU) that states that geological features and craters on Ganymede should be named after deities, heroes and places from Ancient Middle Eastern mythology such as Egyptian mythology.

The IAU approved the name for Nun Sulci in 1979.

== Location ==
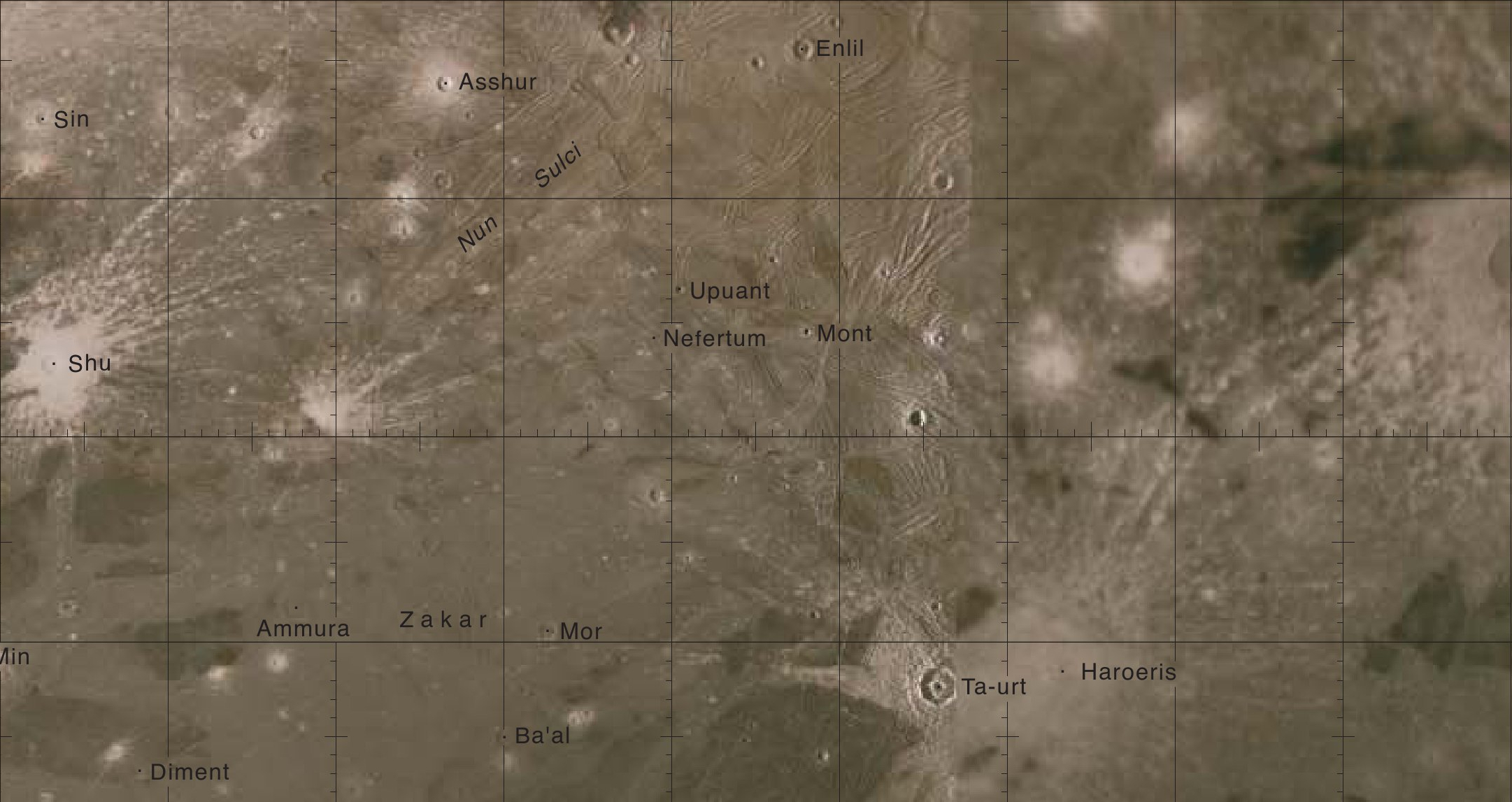
The Nun Sulci quadrangle on Ganymede.

Nun Sulci is located in the northern mid-latitudes of Ganymede. It is so extensive that, based on official maps by the United States Geological Service, it occupies 2% of Ganymede's surface. However, not all parts of the actual sulci were included within the mapped boundaries, so Nun Sulci may be even larger than shown.

This complex surface feature is surrounded by numerous other notable geological features. To its west lie Perrine Regio, the sulcus Sicyon Sulcus, and the bright ray crater Shu. To the southwest are additional bright ray craters, including Min and Diment, as well as another sulcus, Phrygria Sulcus. To the southeast of Nun Sulci lie two bright ray craters, Ta-urt and Haroeris, as well as the dark, ancient region called Melotte Regio. To the south lies another sprawling, complex feature known as Mysia Sulci.

Overall, Nun Sulci has very few impact craters, probably due to the fact that it has been extensively resurfaced by multiple episodes of tectonic activity. It hosts a handful of named craters, including Asshur and Enlil in its northern region; Nefertum, Upuant, and Mont near its center; and Zakar, Ammura, and Mor in its southern region.

Nun Sulci occupies most of the fifth quadrangle of Ganymede (designated Jg5). This quadrangle is named after its most extensive feature, Nun Sulci.

== Geology ==
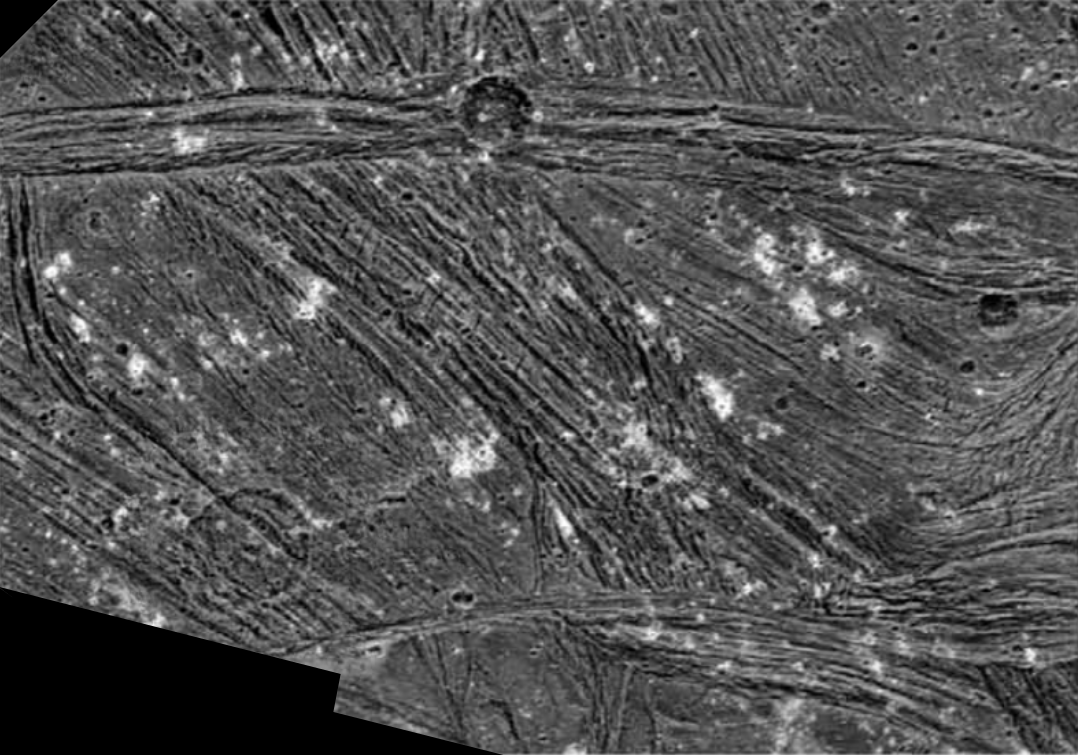
A mosaic image of the central part of Nun Sulci, taken by Galileo in April 1997. The crater at the top is Upuant, while Nefertum lies in the lower left. The bright splotches in this image are craters that were formed primarily by secondary impacts from the ray craters Tros and Haroeris.

Like many of Ganymede's bright regions, Nun Sulci is a relatively young terrain characterized by multiple generations of crisscrossing ridges and grooves. It is strongly believed that the bright, grooved terrains on Ganymede formed later than the moon's dark, rugged terrains. Most bright terrains on Ganymede are generally thought to have been created by clear, fresh water ice upwelling from beneath the moon's crust. These fresh ices then reflect a large amount of sunlight, making Nun Sulci relatively bright compared to other areas of Ganymede.

Mosaic images of Nun Sulci reveal a complex network of intersecting light-toned bands that generally trend northwest–southeast or east–west. Of the few craters within Nun Sulci, Nefertum and Zakar, in particular, are craters that were heavily deformed by the tectonic forces that formed Nun Sulci.

The bright terrains on Ganymede are analogous in age to the dark Lunar maria on the Earth's Moon, as both represent the youngest regions of their respective moons's surfaces. On the Earth's Moon, younger surfaces are formed by dark basalt lava flows, whereas on Ganymede, bright water ice fulfills a similar role. Conversely, the dark terrains on Ganymede are comparable to the bright Lunar highlands, which are older than the maria on the Moon.

Several bright craters peppering Nun Sulci were formed by ejecta and secondary impacts associated with the nearby ray craters Tros and Haroeris.

== Natural History ==
The grooves of Nun Sulci appear to have been created mostly by slip-strike faulting in every directions. The sulci probably experienced two main stages of tectonic deformation during its formation. First, a northeast–southwest extension and normal faulting affected the oldest domains, possibly accompanied by a component of right-lateral shear along the right-shearing axis, which can be inferred from the straining of Nefertum crater. Second, the principal stress directions rotate counterclockwise about a vertical axis, transitioning to a northwest–southeast extensional regime. This shift results in left-lateral offset of the zone along the simple shear axis, reactivation of extensional fractures in the youngest domain, and the formation of several overlapping fractures within the zone. At least three elements of strike-slip faulting are thought to be present in Nun Sulci: staggered zones, fault duplexes, and offset features.

The final result of these tectonic processes is the chaotic grooved terrain of Nun Sulci, where the grooves intersect and crisscross each other in multiple directions, unlike most other sulci on Ganymede, whose troughs and rifts run nearly parallel in a single direction.

== Exploration ==
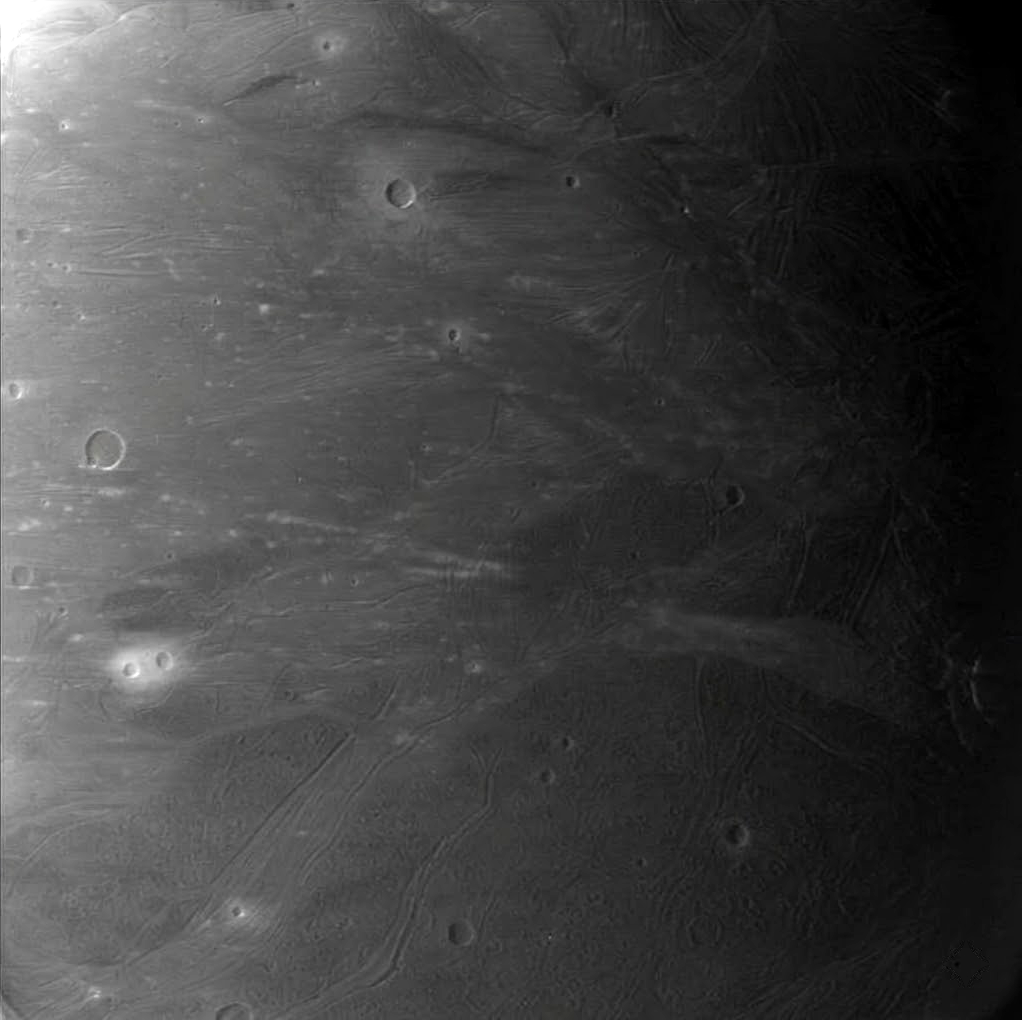
The southeastern section of Nun Sulci, taken by Voyager 1 in March 1979. The multiring crater on the right, straddling the terminator, is Ta-urt.

Voyager 1 was the first probe to clearly view Nun Sulci during its brief flyby of Ganymede in March 1979. The sulci was near the terminator of Ganymede during the probe's visit, which cast strong shadows across its rifts and troughs, allowing the spacecraft to capture the texture of the landscape in great detail. However, the eastern section of the sulci was on the night side and it could not be photographed.

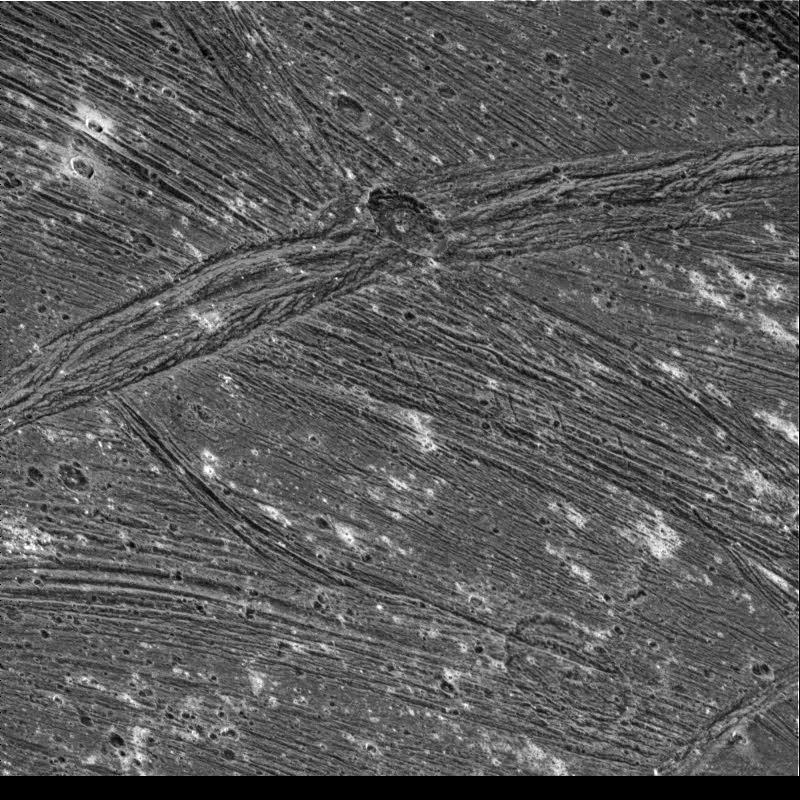
An image of Nun Sulci, taken by Galileo in April 1997. The crater slightly above the center is Upuant while the crater to the lower right is Nefertum.

Galileo became the next probe and last probe to observe Nun Sulci when it flew by the northern hemisphere of Ganymede's Jupiter-facing side in April 1997. As of 2026, it was the last probe to have done so. The spacecraft flew close to the section of Nun Sulci containing the craters Nefertum, Upuant, and Mont, resolving details as small as 170 m per pixel. However, because Nun Sulci is extremely large, the spacecraft captured only a small portion of the feature at high resolution. Voyager 1's medium-resolution images of the rest of Nun Sulci remain the only complete images of the entire sulci.

=== Future Missions ===
The European Space Agency's (ESA) Jupiter Icy Moons Explorer (Juice), which was launched in April 2023, will arrive at Jupiter in July 2031. After spending approximately around three and a half years in orbit around Jupiter and performing multiple flybys of the icy moons Europa, Callisto and Ganymede, Juice will settle into a low polar orbit around Ganymede at a distance of as low as 500 kilometres (310 mi). Juice will be able to complete the high-resolution mapping of Nun Sulci that Galileo was unable to capture.

== See also ==
- Sulcus (geology)
- List of quadrangles on Ganymede
- Ganymede (moon)
