= Cultural influence of Jules Verne =

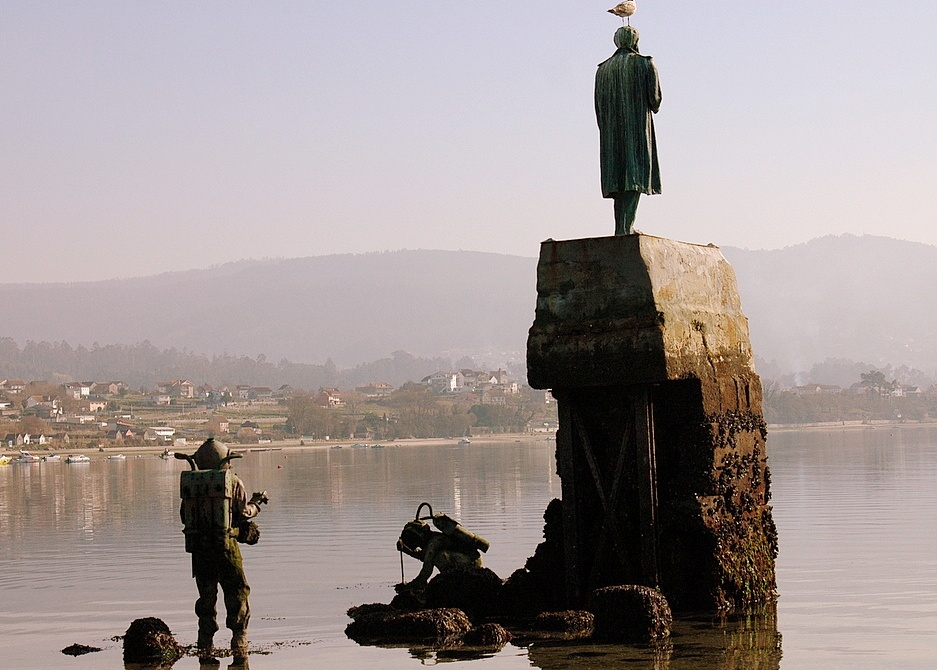
Monument to Jules Verne in Redondela, Spain

Jules Verne (1828–1905), the French writer best known for his Voyages extraordinaires series, has had a wide influence in both scientific and literary fields. According to the Index Translationum, he has the second most number of translated works among all authors.

== Scientific influence ==
The pioneering submarine designer Simon Lake credited his inspiration to Twenty Thousand Leagues Under the Seas, and his autobiography begins "Jules Verne was in a sense the director-general of my life." William Beebe, Sir Ernest Shackleton, and Robert Ballard found similar early inspiration in the novel, and Jacques Cousteau called it his "shipboard bible".

The aviation pioneer Alberto Santos-Dumont named Verne as his favorite author and the inspiration for his own elaborate flying machines. Igor Sikorsky often quoted Verne and cited his Robur the Conqueror as the inspiration for his invention of the first successful helicopter.

The rocketry innovators Konstantin Tsiolkovsky, Robert Goddard, and Hermann Oberth are all known to have taken their inspiration from Verne's From the Earth to the Moon. Frank Borman, Jim Lovell, and William Anders, the astronauts on the Apollo 8 mission, were similarly inspired, with Borman commenting "In a very real sense, Jules Verne is one of the pioneers of the space age".

When cosmonaut Georgi Grechko was orbiting Earth with Yuri Romanenko on the Salyut 6 in 1978, he broadcast back a message to celebrate Verne's 150th birthday, saying: "There's hardly a person who hasn't read his books, at any rate not among the cosmonauts, because Jules Verne was a dreamer, a visionary who saw flights in space. I'd say this flight too was predicted by Jules Verne."

Polar explorer Richard E. Byrd, after a flight to the South Pole, paid tribute to Verne's polar novels The Adventures of Captain Hatteras and An Antarctic Mystery by saying "It was Jules Verne who launched me on this trip."

Edwin Hubble, the American astronomer, was in his youth fascinated by Verne's novels, especially From the Earth to the Moon and Twenty Thousand Leagues Under the Seas. Their influence was so strong that, like Verne, Hubble gave up the career path in law that his father intended for him, setting off instead to pursue his passion for science.

The preeminent speleologist Édouard-Alfred Martel noted in several of his scientific reports that his interest in caves was sparked by Verne's Mathias Sandorf. Another influential speleologist, Norbert Casteret, traced his love of "caverns, abysses and underground rivers" to his avid youthful reading of Journey to the Center of the Earth, calling it "a marvelous book, which impressed and fascinated me more than any other", and adding "I sometimes re-read it still, each time finding anew the joys and enthusiasm of my childhood".

The French general Hubert Lyautey took much inspiration from the explorations in Verne's novels. When one of his more ambitious foreign projects was met with the reply "All this, sir, it's like doing a Jules Verne", Lyautey famously responded: "Yes, sir, it's like doing a Jules Verne, because for twenty years, the people who move forward have been doing a Jules Verne."

David Hanson named the artificial intelligence conversational character robot designed and built by him Jules in memory of Jules Verne. It is able to speak and respond in a human like manner, based on what it hears and has facial muscles that react to speech.

Verne has also been mentioned during human missions to the Moon; during the return flight of the Apollo 11 crew in 1969 and at splashdown of the Artemis II, the first crewed flight beyond low Earth orbit since Apollo 17 in 1972. During their return journey from the Moon, the crew of Apollo 11 made reference to Jules Verne's book during a TV broadcast on 23 July 1969. The mission's commander, astronaut Neil Armstrong, said, "A hundred years ago, Jules Verne wrote a book about a voyage to the Moon. His spaceship, Columbia [sic], took off from Florida and landed in the Pacific Ocean after completing a trip to the Moon. It seems appropriate to us to share with you some of the reflections of the crew as the modern-day Columbia completes its rendezvous with the planet Earth and the same Pacific Ocean tomorrow."

In 2026, upon the splashdown return of the crewed lunar flyby mission Artemis II, NASA Public Affairs Officer and commentator Rob Navias referenced Verne on NASA's official broadcast, stating "Splashdown confirmed at 7:07pm Central Time, 5:07pm Pacific Time, from the pages of Jules Verne to a modern day mission to the moon, a new chapter of the exploration of our celestial neighbor is complete".

Other scientific figures known to have been influenced by Verne include Fridtjof Nansen, Wernher von Braun, Guglielmo Marconi, and Yuri Gagarin.

== Literary influence ==
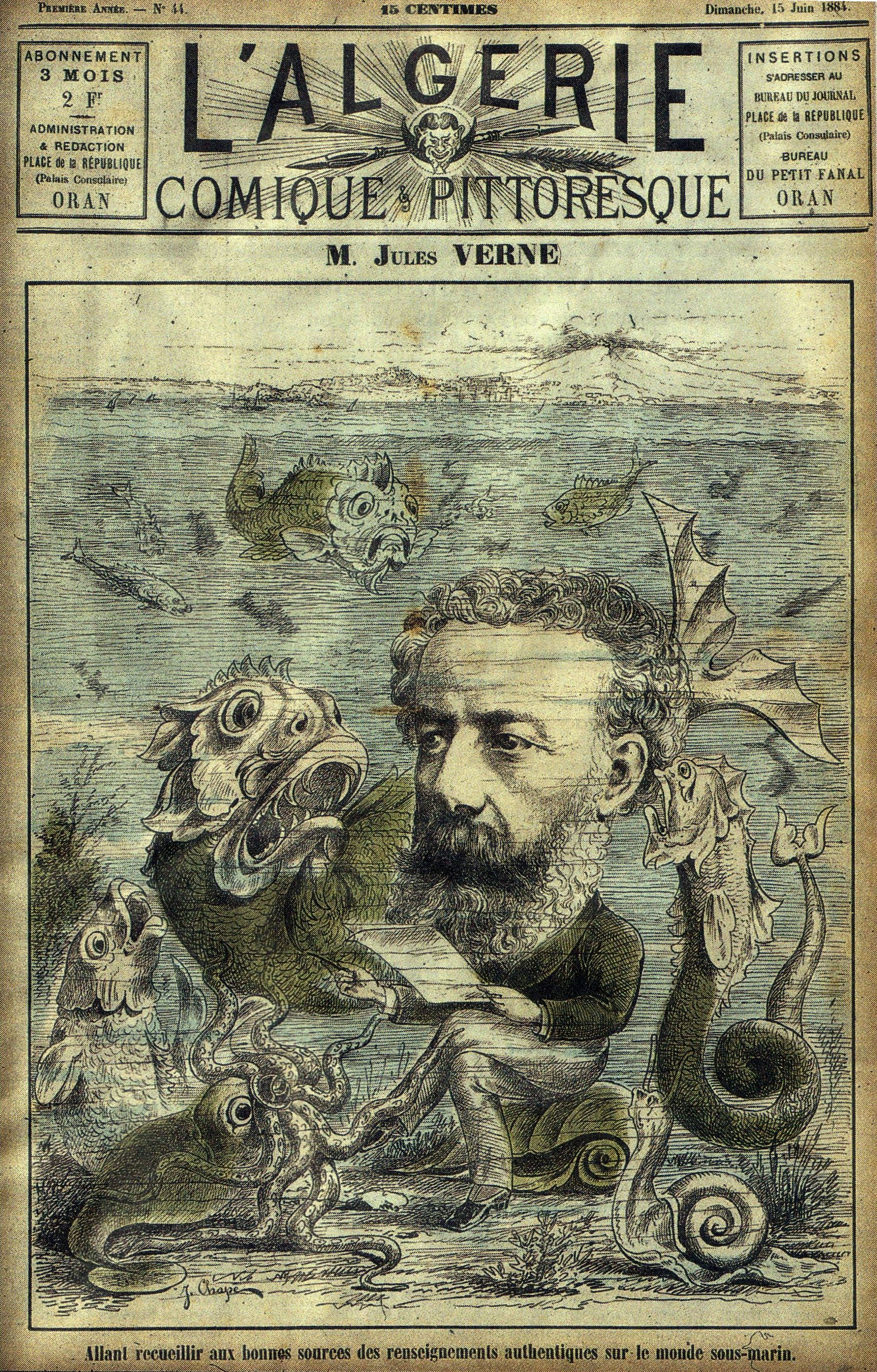
Cover of L'Algerie magazine, June 15, 1884. The text reads "M. Jules Verne: going to the best sources for authentic information on the underwater world."

Arthur Rimbaud was inspired to write his well-known poem "Le Bateau ivre" after reading Twenty Thousand Leagues Under the Seas, which he extensively alludes to within the poem; The Adventures of Captain Hatteras was likely an additional source of inspiration.

In the 1920s, many members of the Surrealist movement named Verne as one of their greatest and most imaginative precursors. Eugène Ionesco said that all of his works, whether directly or indirectly, were written in celebration of Captain Hatteras's conquest of the North Pole. Another surrealist, the Greek poet Andreas Embirikos, paid tribute to Verne in his nine-volume magnum opus The Great Eastern (Megas Anatolikos, 1990), which borrows from Verne's A Floating City and includes Verne himself among its characters.

Raymond Roussel was profoundly influenced both thematically and stylistically by Verne, whom he called a "man of incommensurate genius" and an "incomparable master", adding that in many passages Verne "raised himself to the highest peaks that can be attained by human language."

Jean Cocteau cited both Around the World in Eighty Days and Verne's own 1874 dramatization of it as major childhood influences, calling the novel a "masterpiece" and adding "Play and book alike not only thrilled our young imagination but, better than atlases and maps, whetted our appetite for adventure in far lands. … Never for me will any real ocean have the glamour of that sheet of green canvas, heaved on the backs of the Châtelet stage-hands crawling like caterpillars beneath it, while Phileas and Passepartout from the dismantled hull watch the lights of Liverpool twinkling in the distance."

Antoine de Saint-Exupéry, who discovered the Voyages extraordinaires as a child and became one of Verne's enthusiastic adult proponents in the first half of the 20th century, used Verne's The Black Indies as inspiration for his own novel Night Flight.

The French experimental writer Georges Perec ardently read and reread Verne's works from adolescence onward, and allusions to Verne appear in many of his novels, including Life A User's Manual, A Gallery Portrait, and W, or the Memory of Childhood. Perec once commented: "When Jules Verne lists all the names of fish over four pages in Twenty Thousand Leagues Under the Seas, I feel as though I am reading a poem."

The Swiss traveler and writer Nicolas Bouvier cited Verne as his initiation into geography, and named Mathias Sandorf and Phileas Fogg among his childhood heroes. The British traveler and filmmaker Graham Hughes has similarly identified Fogg as one of his inspirations.

According to scholarly hypothesis, J.R.R. Tolkien was inspired by Verne during the writing of his Legendarium narratives. The Tolkien scholar Mark T. Hooker and the philosopher Roderick Long have both written that the parallels between The Hobbit and Journey to the Center of the Earth are likely too extensive to have arisen simply by chance (both include a hidden runic message and a celestial alignment directing the adventurers to their goal, among other parallels), and the Verne scholar William Butcher has noted similar narrative parallels between The Lord of the Rings and The Adventures of Captain Hatteras.

In an introduction to a biography of Verne, Arthur C. Clarke wrote: "Jules Verne had already been dead for a dozen years when I was born. Yet I feel strongly connected to him, and his works of science fiction had a major influence on my own career. He is among the top five people I wish I could have met in person."

The English novelist Margaret Drabble was deeply influenced by Twenty Thousand Leagues Under the Seas as a child and remains a fervent admirer of Verne. She comments: "I used to be somewhat ashamed of my love of Verne, but have recently discovered that he is the darling of the French avant-garde, who take him far more seriously than we Anglo-Saxons do. So I'm in good company."

Ray Bradbury counted Verne as a main influence on his own fiction as well as on literature and science the world over, saying "We are all, in one way or another, the children of Jules Verne."

Rick Riordan wrote a novel, Daughter of the Deep (2021), which is derivative of Twenty Thousand Leagues Under the Seas and The Mysterious Island; in the foreword, he said he had a long-standing fascination with these novels, with Captain Nemo, and with the sea in general, which informed his creation of his best-known character, modern-day Greek mythological hero Percy Jackson, a son of Poseidon.

Other literary figures known to have been influenced by Verne include Paul Claudel, François Mauriac, Blaise Cendrars, Jean-Paul Sartre, Marcel Aymé, René Barjavel, Claude Roy, Michel Butor, and Roland Barthes. Verne is also often cited as a major influence of the science fiction genre steampunk, though his works themselves are not of the genre.

== Monuments and tributes ==
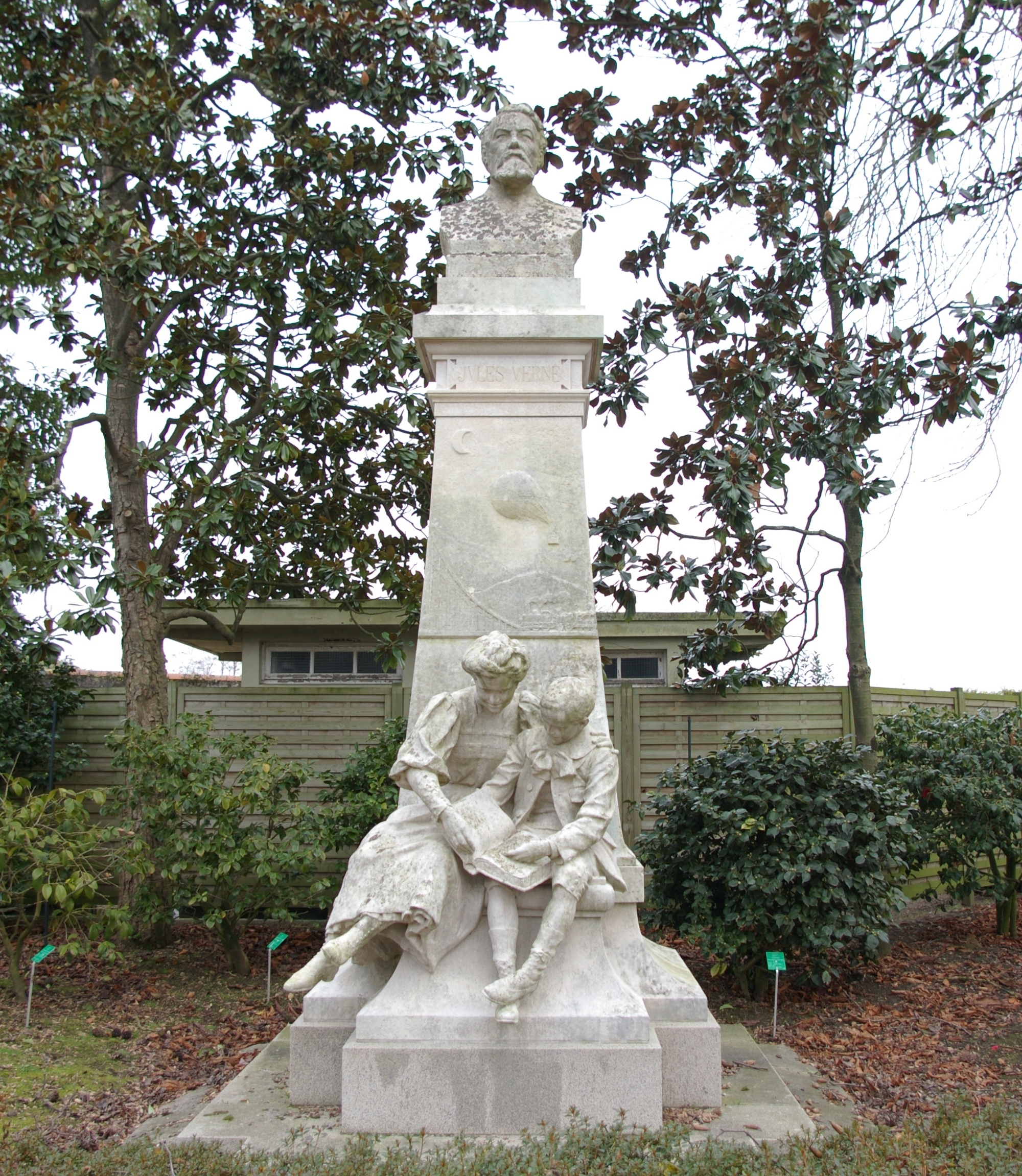
Monument to Verne at the Jardin des Plantes in Nantes

- Because Verne was a longtime resident of Amiens, many places there are named after him, such as the Cirque Jules Verne. Amiens is the place where Verne is buried, and the house where he lived is now a museum. There is also the Jules Verne Museum in Nantes.
- A restaurant in the Eiffel Tower in Paris is named "Le Jules Verne". In June 1989, the Jules Verne Food Court opened at the Merry Hill Shopping Centre in the West Midlands of England; however, it had closed by the mid-1990s due to disappointing trade.
- In 1961, a large impact crater on the far side of the Moon was named Jules Verne in tribute to the writer.
- In 1970, the University of Picardie Jules Verne was founded in Amiens. A public francophone secondary school in Vancouver was founded and named École secondaire Jules-Verne in 2007.
- The express train running between Nantes and Paris from 1980 to 1989 was named Jules Verne in the writer's honor. Two French ships were also named after him, and the international prize for around the world sailing records is named the Jules Verne Trophy.
- In 1999, the Science Fiction and Fantasy Hall of Fame inducted Verne in its fourth annual class of two deceased and two living persons, citing him for having "helped shape and found modern science fiction." Verne is one of three inductees who contributed prior to 1900 (Wells, Verne and Mary Shelley preceded all other inductees by about one, two, and three generations) and one of two from outside the Anglophone world (the French artist Jean Giraud was inducted in 2011). (Note: Science fiction magazine editors Hugo Gernsback and John W. Campbell were the inaugural deceased members of the Science Fiction and Fantasy Hall of Fame, followed annually by fiction writers H. G. Wells and Isaac Asimov, C. L. Moore and Robert Heinlein, Abraham Merritt and Verne.)
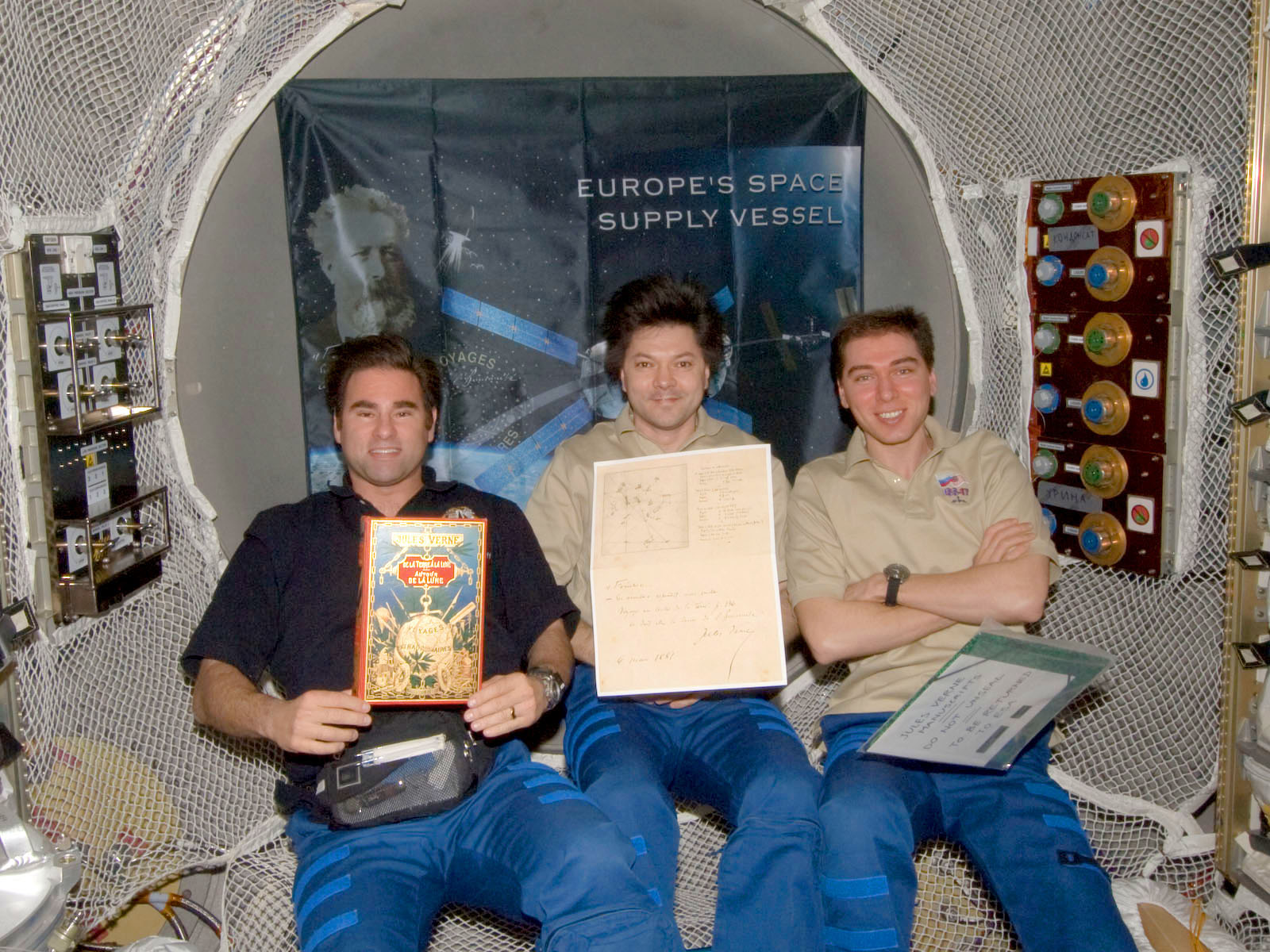
- Astronauts displaying works by Verne on the International Space Station
  On 9 March 2008, the European Space Agency launched an uncrewed cargo spacecraft named the Jules Verne ATV on a mission to bring supplies and cargo to the International Space Station. In homage to Verne's astronomical writings, the craft carried two handwritten manuscript pages from Verne's files as well as a Hetzel double edition of From the Earth to the Moon and Around the Moon published in Verne's lifetime.
- In 2011, Google commemorated Jules Verne's 183rd birthday by featuring a Google Doodle based on his works.
- Two ships of the French Navy have been named Jules Verne.
- CMA CGM Jules Verne, one of the largest container ships in the world, was named for him in 2013.
- RSS Jules Verne, was Blue Origin's prototype space capsule for the New Shepard suborbital tourist rocket.
- The Jules Verne Trophy is awarded to the fastest circumnavigation of the world by sailboat, as a reference of the novel Around the World in Eighty Days.
- Minor planet 5231 Verne is named in his honor.
- Lego released a special set referencing his books titled Tribute to Jules Verne's Books.

== References in popular culture ==
- In the film Back to the Future Part III (1990), Doc Emmett Brown's children are named Jules and Verne.
- Jules Verne appeared in the Transformers: Rescue Bots series episode "Last of Morocco", where he is revealed to be the estranged friend of recurring series antagonist Thaddeus Morocco. He is also a time traveler, having discovered a means of moving through the ages using a device of his own invention and Energon, the power source of all Transformers. After being contacted by his old friend, Verne travels to the present day, meets the Rescue Bots, and reveals that he has encountered other Transformers during his travels through time. At the time that he meets the series' heroes, he has not yet written Twenty Thousand Leagues Under the Seas, but later becomes determined to do so after taking a trip in a submarine. In a paradox, Morocco has a submarine called the Nemo that he presumably named for Jules Verne's character, whom Verne presumably named after the adventure involving the submarine. As a result of the episode's events, Verne takes Morocco - whose memories have been erased so that he no longer remembers his villainous career - to the future to live.
- JV- The Extraordinary Adventures of Jules Verne is an Italian animated television series that recounts the fictionalized adventures of Jules Verne at age 16.
- Jules Verne has influenced various Japanese steampunk anime and manga works, notably Hayao Miyazaki's anime productions such as Future Boy Conan (1979), Castle in the Sky (1986) and Nadia: The Secret of Blue Water (1990). Nadia is loosely based on Twenty Thousand Leagues Under the Seas, with Captain Nemo making an appearance.
- Space Mountain De la Terre à la Lune was a themed rollercoaster at Disneyland Paris after the story by Jules Verne.
- Jules Verne leads a fellowship of vampire hunters set in the year 1888 in the novel Modern Marvels - Viktoriana (2013) written by Wayne Reinagel. The fellowship includes Mary Shelley, Edgar Allan Poe, H.G. Wells, Bram Stoker, Arthur Conan Doyle, Nikola Tesla, Harry Houdini and H. Rider Haggard.
- Les Mystères du Nautilus is a guided tour at Disneyland Paris and a darkride at Tokyo Disneyland after the story by Jules Verne.
- Horizons (Epcot) had an animatronic of Jules Verne at the start of the ride.

== Notes ==
=== Citations ===
- Angenot, Marc (Spring 1973), "Jules Verne and French Literary Criticism", Science Fiction Studies, I (1): 33–37
- Butcher, William (2006), Jules Verne: The Definitive Biography, New York: Thunder's Mouth Press
- Evans, Arthur B. (2000), "Jules Verne and the French Literary Canon", in Smyth, Edmund J. (ed.), Jules Verne: Narratives of Modernity, Liverpool: Liverpool University Press, pp. 11–39
- Hale, Terry; Hugill, Andrew (2000), "The Science is Fiction: Jules Verne, Raymond Roussel, and Surrealism", in Smyth, Edmund J. (ed.), Jules Verne: Narratives of Modernity, Liverpool: Liverpool University Press
- Strauss, Mark (16 March 2012), "Ten Inventions Inspired by Science Fiction", Smithsonian.com, Smithsonian Institution, archived from the original on 8 April 2013
- Takaoka, Atsuko (1990), "Rimbaud et Jules Verne: Au sujet des sources du Bateau Ivre" (PDF), Gallia, 30: 43–51, archived from the original (PDF) on 4 March 2016
