= Jules Verne (disambiguation) =

Jules Verne (1828–1905) was a French futuristic author.

Jules Verne may also refer to:

== Facilities and structures ==
- University of Picardy Jules Verne, a university in Amiens, Picardy, France
- École secondaire Jules-Verne, a school in Vancouver, British Columbia, Canada

== Vehicles and transportation ==
- Jules Verne (train), a French express train that operated in the 1980s
- French ship Jules Verne, more than one ship of the French Navy
- Jules Verne ATV, a European Space Agency spacecraft
- RSS Jules Verne, a Blue Origin space capsule for New Shepard
- Jules Verne Train, a flying time machine steam locomotive from Back to the Future: Part III

== Characters ==
- Jules Verne Durand, an alien character in the novel Anathem by Neal Stephenson
- Jules Verne, a character from The Secret Adventures of Jules Verne

== Other uses ==
- Jules Verne Trophy, a non-stop sail race around the world
- Le Jules Verne, a gourmet restaurant on the second floor of the Eiffel Tower
- Jules Verne (crater), a crater on the Moon
