= Montreuil-Bellay station =

Railway station in Montreuil-Bellay, France

Coordinates: 47.1253°N 0.1481°W

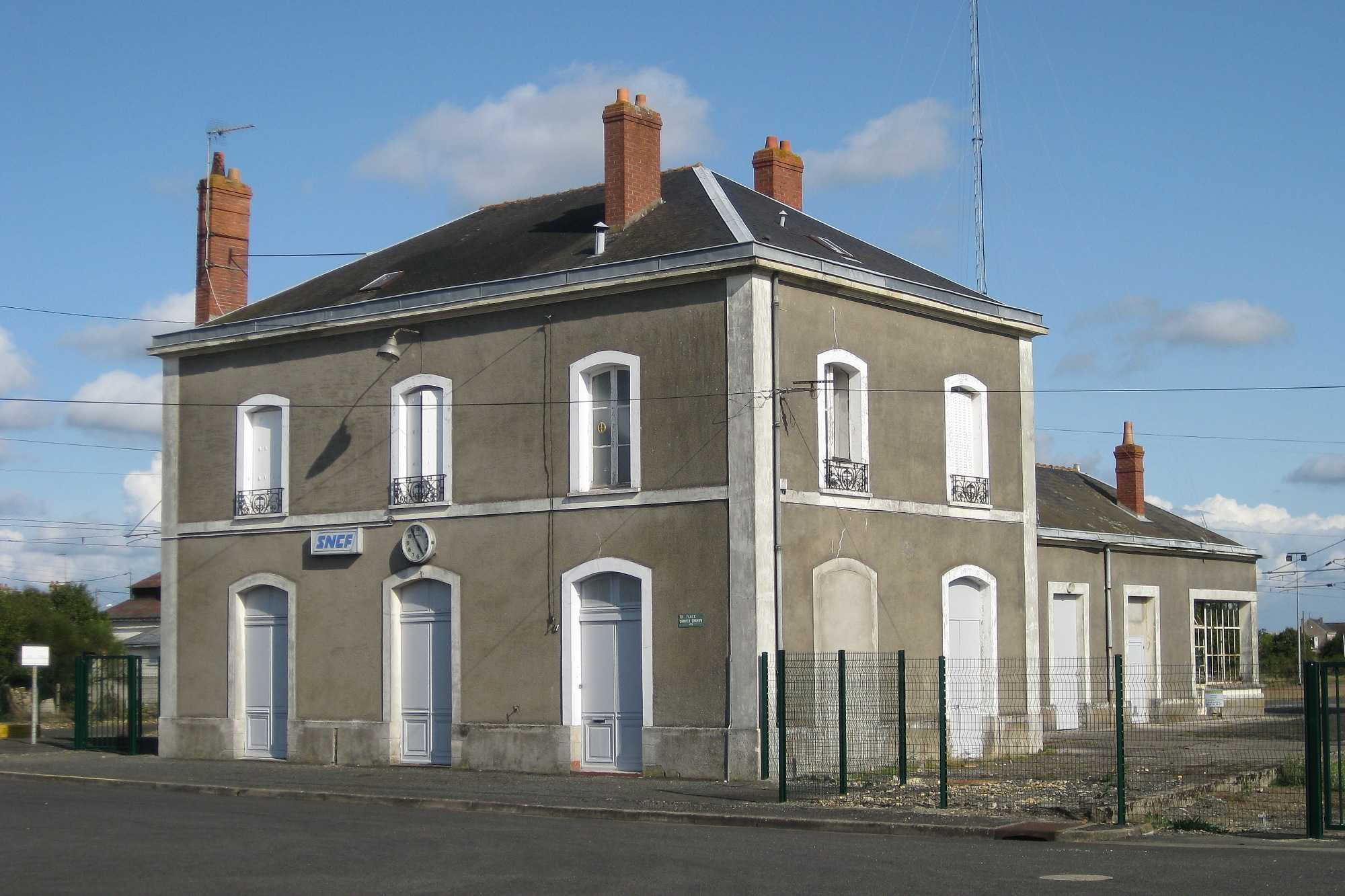
Gare de Montreuil-Bellay

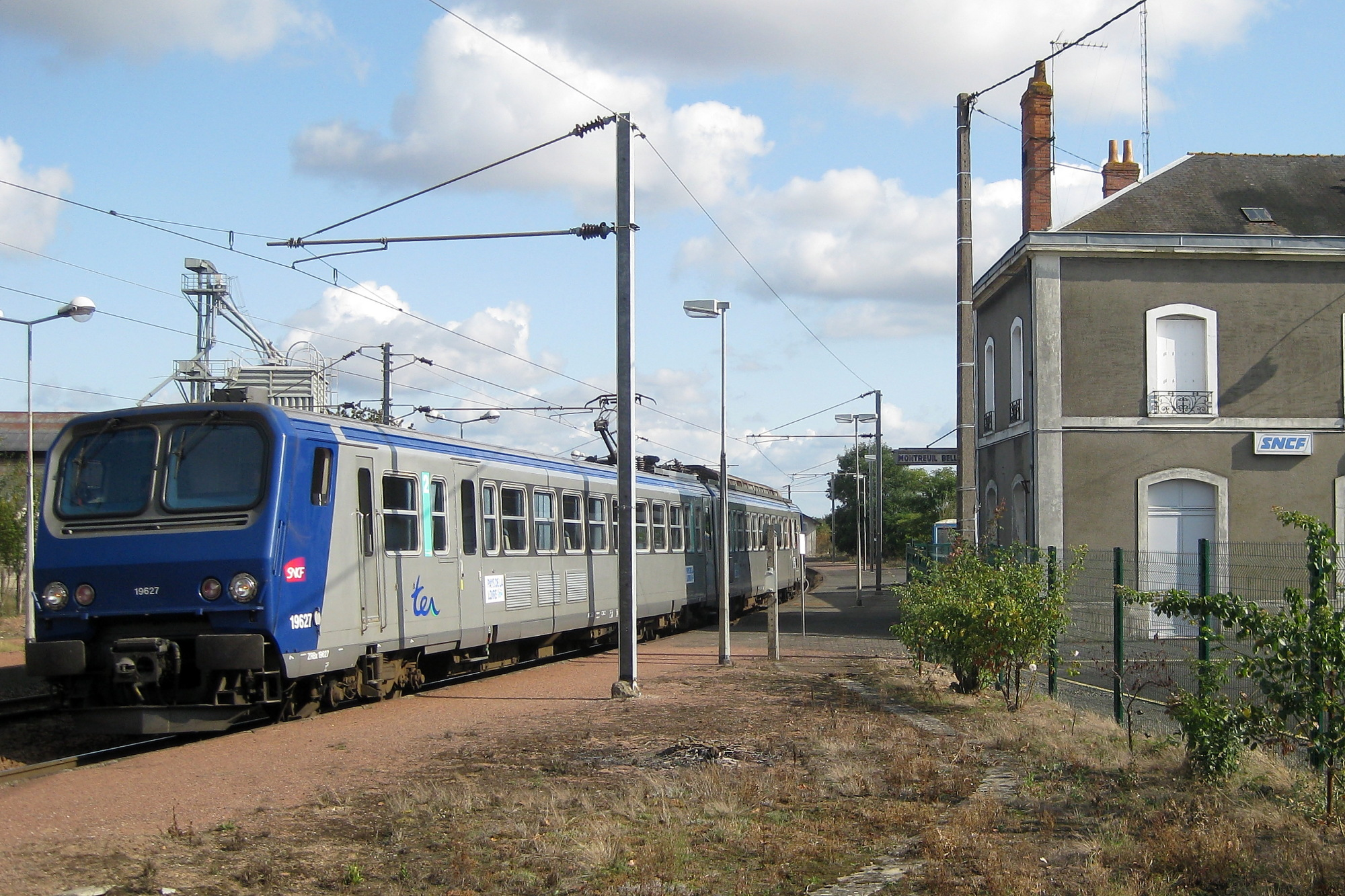
SNCF Class Z 9600 at Gare de Montreuil-Bellay

Gare de Montreuil-Bellay is a railway station serving the village of Montreuil-Bellay, Maine-et-Loire, western France. It is situated on the Saumur-Thouars railway, an electrified branch line of approximately 10 miles in length. To the north of the line Saumur station also lies on the Tours–Saint-Nazaire railway. TGV services to Paris are available from Tours. Thouars station to the south is situated on the Loudun-La Roche-Sur-Yon railway.

The station is served by regional trains (TER Pays de la Loire) towards Thouars, Saumur, Tours and La Roche-sur-Yon.

Preceding station	TER Pays de la Loire	Following station
Thouars towards La Roche-sur-Yon	14	Saumur towards Tours
