= Metatextuality =

Form of intertextual discourse

Metatextuality is a form of intertextual discourse in which a text makes critical commentary on itself or on another text. This concept is related to Gérard Genette's concept of transtextuality in which a text changes or expands on the content of another text.

== See also ==
- Parody
- Post-structuralism
- Semiotics
- Translation
