= Giraud II of Montreuil-Berlay =

12th century feudal lord of Montreuil-Bellay, near Saumur, France

Giraud II of Montreuil-Berlay (died c. 1155) was a twelfth-century feudal lord of Montreuil-Bellay, near Saumur in France. He was dispossessed of the Château de Montreuil-Bellay by Geoffrey Plantagenet.

He was made seneschal of Poitou by Louis VII of France. Later, from 1149, he led a rebellion against Geoffrey Plantagenet of local lords in southern Anjou, including André de Doué and Aimery d'Avoir. After a year's siege he was captured and imprisoned by Geoffrey; later being released through the support of Louis.

He was part of the family Berlay-Le-Vieux the son of Berlay II of Montreuil-Berlay, or of Berlay III of Montreuil-Berlay. The old spelling of the commune over which he exerted his lordship was Berlai.
