= Régis Messac =

French writer

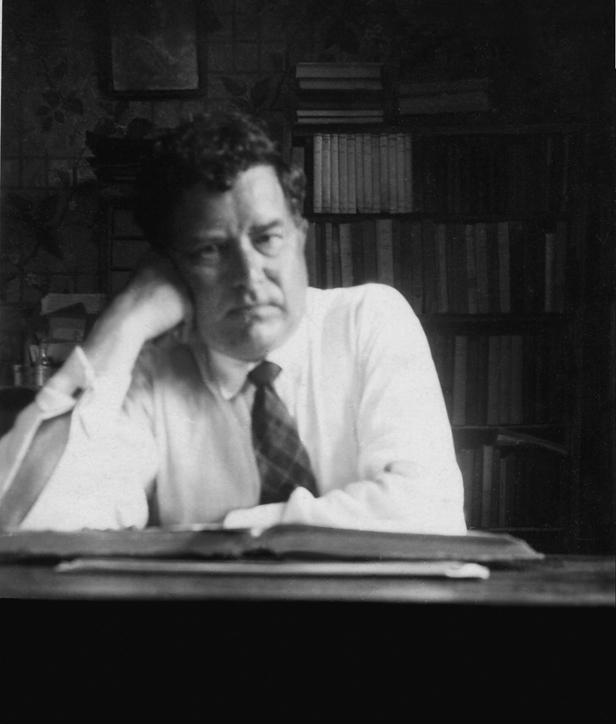
- Born: 2 August 1893; Champagnac, France
- Died: 1945 (aged 51–52); Gross-Rosen concentration camp or Mittelbau-Dora, Nazi Germany

Régis Messac (2 August 1893 – 1945) was a French essayist, poet and translator.

== Published works ==
Studies

- Le « Detective Novel » et l'influence de la pensée scientifique (1929) ; new edition, corrected and annotated, preface by Claude Amoz, postface by François Guérif: (les Belles Lettres, coll. Encrage/travaux, 2011)
- Influences française dans l'œuvre d'Edgar Poe (1929)
- Micromégas (1936)
- Brève histoire des hommes (1939)
- Esquisse d'une chronobibliographie des Utopies ([1940] 1962)
- La Révolution culturelle ([1938] 1988)
- Les Romans de l’homme-singe, pref. by Marc Angenot ([1935] 2007)
- Les Premières Utopies, pref. by Serge Lehman (Éditions ex nihilo, 2009)

Poetry

- Poèmes guerriers (1929)

Pamphlet

- À bas le latin ! (1933) ; new edition, established, presented and completed by Olivier Messac, pref. by Anne-Marie Ozanam, (Éditions ex nihilo, 2010)

Novels and short stories (SF)

- Quinzinzinzili (in French). 1935. réédité chez L'Arbre Vengeur coll. L'Alambic in 2007. First English translation Quinzinzinzany by Mathieu Triay in issues One (Visions of Home, 2018) and Two (Visions of humanity, 2019) of Visions, a British science fiction magazine in trade paperback format.
- La Cité des asphyxiés ([1937] 2010)
- Valcrétin (in French). Editions ex nihilo. 2009. ISBN 978-2916185064.
- Musique arachnéenne ([1934] 1973)
- Le Miroir flexible [1933], pref. by Gérard Klein (2008)

Romans à caractère autobiographique

- Le Voyage de Néania à travers la guerre et la paix [1926], pref. by Didier Daeninckx (Éditions ex nihilo, 2014)
- Smith Conundrum, roman d'une université américaine [1942], pref. by Marc Angenot, postf. de Robert Michel (Éditions ex nihilo, 2010)

Chronicles

- Pot-pourri fantôme ([1942] 1958)
- Roman policier, fragment d'histoire, préf. de Gérard Durozoi (Éditions ex nihilo, 2009)
- La Crise, chronique éditoriale, 1930-1939, préf. de Michel Besnier (Éditions ex nihilo, 2013)

Corresponde gérarnce

- Lettres de prison ([1943] 2005)

=== Translations ===
David H. Keller

- Les Mains et la machine (Stenographer's Hands, 1928), 1932
- La Nourrice automatique (The Psychophonic Nurse, 1928), 1936
- La Guerre du lierre (The Ivy War, 1930), 1936
- Pourquoi ? (The Question), 1937
- Le Fou du ciel (The Flying Fool), 1937
- La Lune de miel perpétuelle (Life Everlasting), 1938
- Le Duel sans fin (The Eternal Conflict), 1939 (publication partielle)

Fitz James O'Brien

- Animula (The Diamonds Lens), 1931
- L’Histoire du dragon Fang, 1935

Max Nettlau

- Esquisse d'histoire des Utopies (Esbozo de historia de las Utopias, 1934), 1936-1938

Jack London

- Ce que la vie signifie pour moi (What Life Means to Me, 1905), 1939

== Pseudonyms ==
- Robert Champagnac
- John Doe
- Maxime Dolus
- Jehan Fabian
- Mad Hobo
- Jérémie Jéricho
- Romain Lécapèr
- Gontran Lenoir (taken over by his son Ralph)
- Sancho Llorente
- Robert Ludion
- Le Mandarin
- Columbus North
- L’Ours mal léché
- Margarita Risa
- Elsa Rothgemünde
- Esteban Scanlan
- Doctor Séraphicus
- Laurent Zurbarran

== Bibliography ==
- Bio-bibliographical Notice, by Georges H. Gallet, New York, The Science Fiction News Letter, vol. III, n°10, p. 3-4, 28 January 1939.
- In memoriam, by Roger Denux, la Tribune des fonctionnaires, November 1946.
- Régis Messac, by Ralph Messac, Bulletin des anciens élèves du lycée de Coutances, pages 4 & 5, February 1956.
- Hommage à Régis Messac, by Jean-Jacques Bridenne, Fiction magazine, n°48, November 1957.
- Pour présenter l’auteur… (pref.), by Ralph Messac, in Pot-pourri fantôme, pages 7–9, Paris, Éditions Bellenand, 1958.
- Anthologie des écrivains morts à la guerre (1939-1945), by the Association des écrivains combattants, preface by Maréchal Juin, pages 525-536, Paris, Albin Michel, 1960.
- Un précurseur méconnu de la science-fiction française : Régis Messac, by François Fonvieille-Alquier, pages centrales, Combat, 10 December 1967.
- Régis Messac, by Jean-Jacques Bridenne, Désiré, n°21, April 1969.
- Épitaphe pour Régis Messac, by Francis Lacassin, l'Express, 5 February 1973.
- Régis Messac ou l’humour du désespoir, by Jean-Pierre Andrevon, Fiction, n°236, août 1973.
- La Mort du Loup, itinéraire d’un disparu, (collectif), in Lettres de prison, pages 69–135, Paris, Éditions ex nihilo, 2005.
- Hommage à Régis Messac, by Jean-Jacques Bridenne, A&A le magazine des survivants, n°155, April 2006, repris de Fiction magazine (voir supra).
- Sans titre (préf.), by Marc Angenot, in les Romans de l’homme-singe, pages 7–12, Paris, Éditions ex nihilo, 2007.
- Les Contrepoisons de l'intelligence (prrface), by Éric Dussert, in Quinzinzinzili, p. 5–16, Talence, éd. de l'Arbre vengeur, 2007.
- Sans titre (préf.), by Gérard Klein, in le Miroir flexible, pages 7–17, Paris, Éditions ex nihilo, 2008.
- Sans titre (préf.), by Gérard Durozoi, in Roman policier, fragment d'histoire, pages 7–13, Paris, Éditions ex nihilo, 2009.
- Sans titre (préf.), by Natacha Vas-Deyres, in Valcrétin, pages 7–18, Paris, Éditions ex nihilo, 2009.
- Sans titre (préf.), by Roger Bozzetto, in la Cité des asphyxiés, pages 7–20, Paris, Éditions ex nihilo, 2010.
- Amères racines (préf.), by Anne-Marie Ozanam, in À bas le latin !, pages 5–31, Paris, Éditions ex nihilo, 2010.
- Sans titre (préf.), by Marc Angenot, in Smith Conundrum, roman d'une université américaine, pages 7–15, Paris, Éditions ex nihilo, 2010.
- Régis Messac à l'université McGill (postf.), by Robert Michel, in Smith Conundrum, roman d'une université américaine, pages 167-181, Paris, Éditions ex nihilo, 2010.
- Sans titre (préf.), par Claude Amoz, in Le « Detective Novel » et l'influence de la pensée scientifique, pages 7–19, Paris, les Belles Lettres, coll. Encrage/travaux, 2011.
- Régis Messac, l'écrivain journaliste (collectif, dir. Natacha Vas-Deyres & Olivier Messac), Paris, Éditions ex nihilo, 2012.
- Sans titre (préf.), by Michel Besnier, in la Crise, chronique éditoriale 1930-1939, pages 13–17, Paris, Éditions ex nihilo, 2013.
- Sans titre (préf.), by Didier Daeninckx, in le Voyage de Néania à travers la guerre et la paix, pages 7–13, Paris, Éditions ex nihilo, 2014.

=== Notices ===
- Dictionnaire des anarchistes, « Le Maitron » : notice biographique.
- L'Éphéméride anarchiste : notice biographique.
- René Bianco, 100 ans de presse anarchiste : notice.
