= Saumur station =

Railway station in Saumur, France

Coordinates: 47°16′8″N 0°4′17″W

Saumur
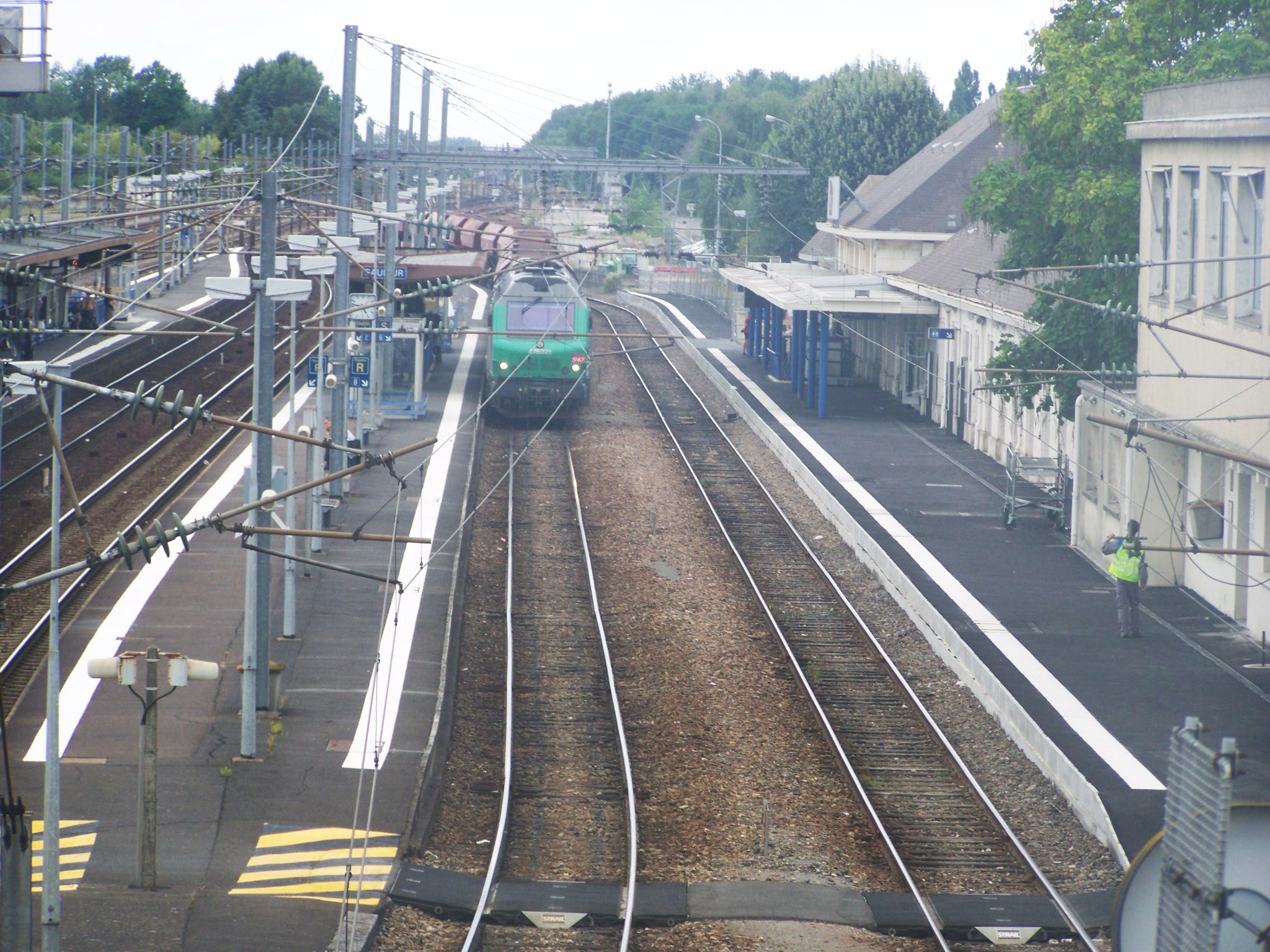

General information
- Location: Avenue David-d'Angers; 49400 Saumur; Maine-et-Loire, France
- Owner: SNCF
- Operator: SNCF

Other information
- Station code: 87487603

Passengers
- 2016: 664 278
Services
| Preceding station | SNCF | Following station |
|---|---|---|
| Saint-Pierre-des-Corps towards Eastern France | TGV inOui | Angers-Saint-Laud towards Nantes |
| Angers-Saint-Laud towards Nantes | Intercités | Saint-Pierre-des-Corps towards Lyon-Perrache |
| Preceding station | TER Pays de la Loire | Following station |
| Montreuil-Bellay towards La Roche-sur-Yon | 14 | Port-Boulet towards Tours |
| Les Rosiers-sur-Loire towards Angers | 19 | Port-Boulet towards Tours |
| Preceding station | Le Réseau Rémi | Following station |
| Angers-Saint-Laud towards Nantes | 2.6 | Tours towards Orléans |
| Preceding station | Ouigo | Following station |
| Saint-Pierre-des-Corps towards Paris-Austerlitz | Train Classique | Angers-Saint-Laud towards Nantes |
Location

Saumur station (French: Gare de Saumur), also known as Saumur-Rive-Droite, is a railway station serving the town of Saumur, Maine-et-Loire department, western France. It is situated on the Tours–Saint-Nazaire railway.

== History ==
The station opened on 20 December 1848. In 2008, it served 673,735 passengers. The station was refurbished from 2010 to 2011.

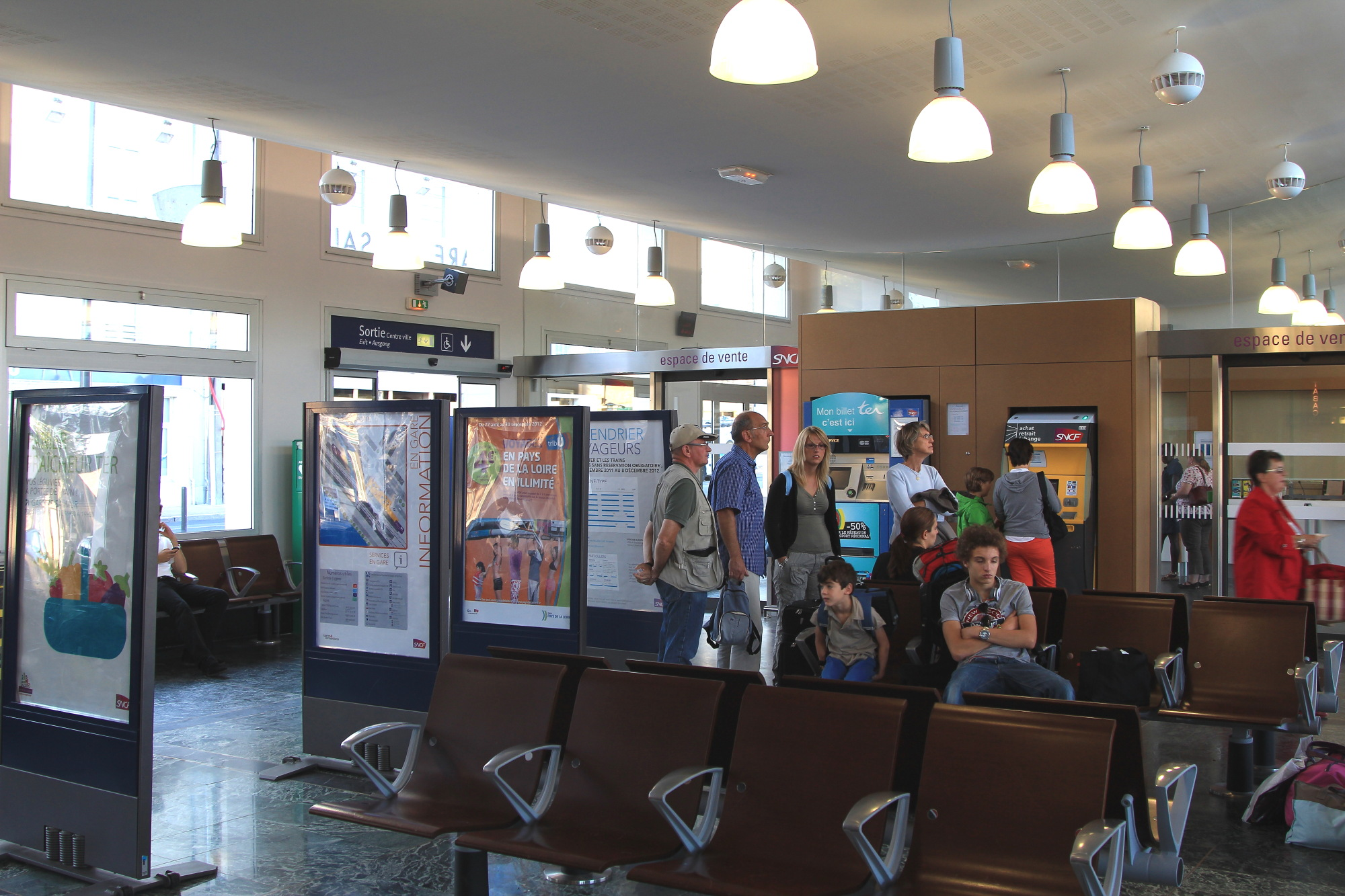
The refurbished waiting room in 2012.

== Services ==
The following services currently call at Saumur:

- Intercity services (Intercités) Nantes - Saint-Pierre-des-Corps - Bourges - Lyon
- Regional services (TER Pays de la Loire) Angers - Saumur - Tours
- Regional services (TER Pays de la Loire) La Roche-sur-Yon - Bressuire - Saumur - Tours
- Regional services (TER Centre-Val de Loire) Nantes - Angers - Saumur - Tours - Blois - Orléans
