= Champagnac, Charente-Maritime =

Champagnac
- Commune
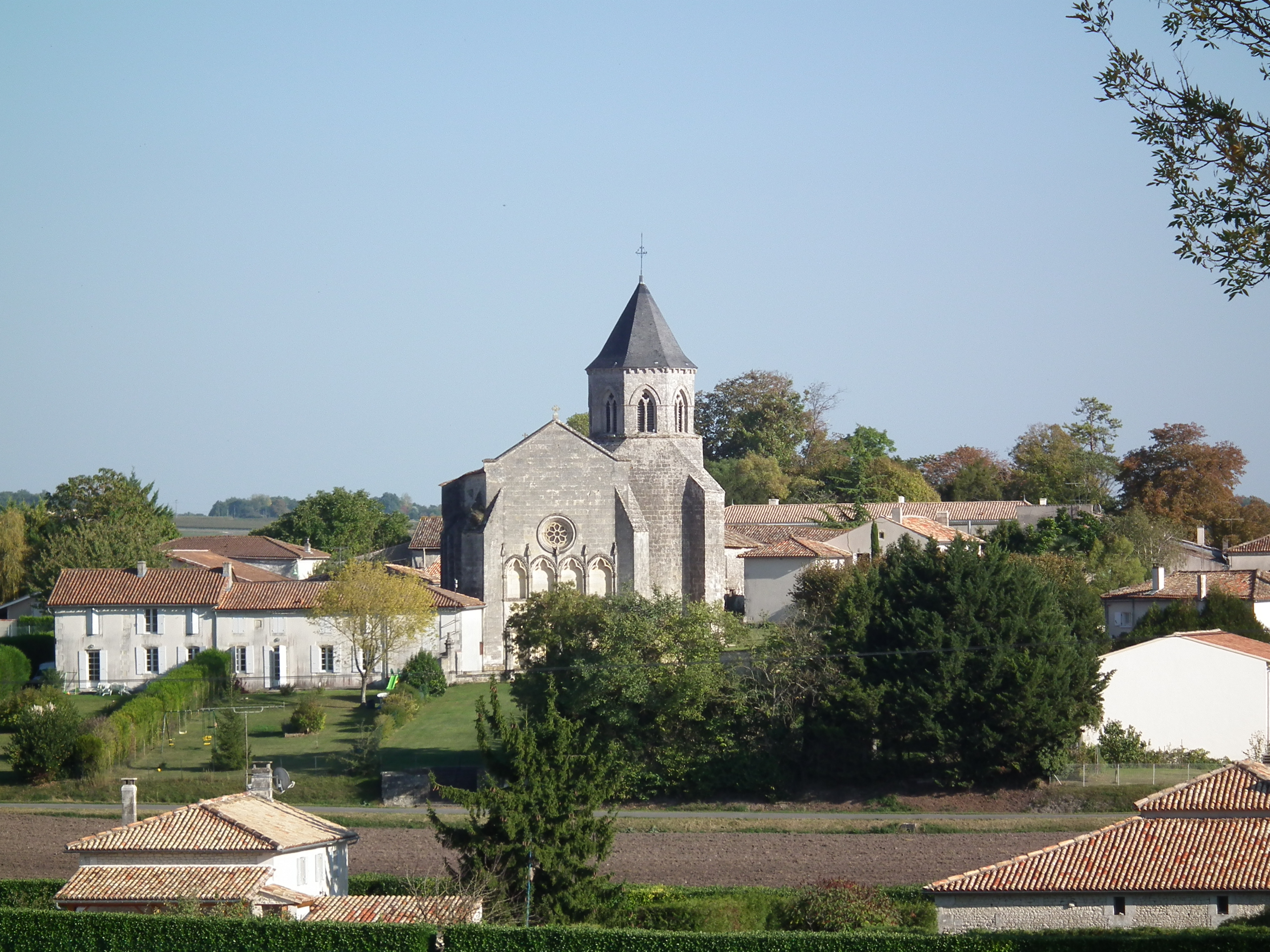
- A general view of Champagnac
- Location of Champagnac
- Location within France Location within Nouvelle-Aquitaine
- Coordinates: 45°25′31″N 0°22′53″W
- Country: France
- Region: Nouvelle-Aquitaine
- Department: Charente-Maritime
- Arrondissement: Jonzac
- Canton: Jonzac

Government
  - Mayor (2020–2026): Michel Rode
- Area^{1}: 12.89 km^{2} (4.98 sq mi)
- Highest elevation: 92 m (302 ft)
- Lowest elevation: 31 m (102 ft)
- Population (2023): 488
  - Density: 37.9/km^{2} (98.1/sq mi)
- Time zone: UTC+01:00 (CET)
  - Summer (DST): UTC+02:00 (CEST)
- INSEE/Postal code: 17082 /17500
- ^{1} French Land Register data, which excludes lakes, ponds, glaciers > 1 km^{2} (0.386 sq mi or 247 acres) and river estuaries.

Champagnac (French pronunciation: [ʃɑ̃paɲak]) is a commune in the Charente-Maritime department in the Nouvelle-Aquitaine region in southwestern France.

== Geography ==
The Seugne forms most of the commune's southwestern border.

== Population ==
Historical population
Year	Pop.	±% p.a.
1968	404	—
1975	401	−0.11%
1982	431	+1.04%
1990	427	−0.12%
1999	463	+0.90%
2007	519	+1.44%
2012	526	+0.27%
2017	529	+0.11%
2023	488	−1.34%
Source: INSEE

== Personalities ==
- Régis Messac, author, (Champagnac, 2 August 1893 - near Gross-Rosen or Dora, around 1945) was born in the Champagnac schoolhouse where his maternal grandparents, Jean Gabillaud and his wife Justine taught.

== See also ==
- Communes of the Charente-Maritime department
