= Jules Verne (train) =

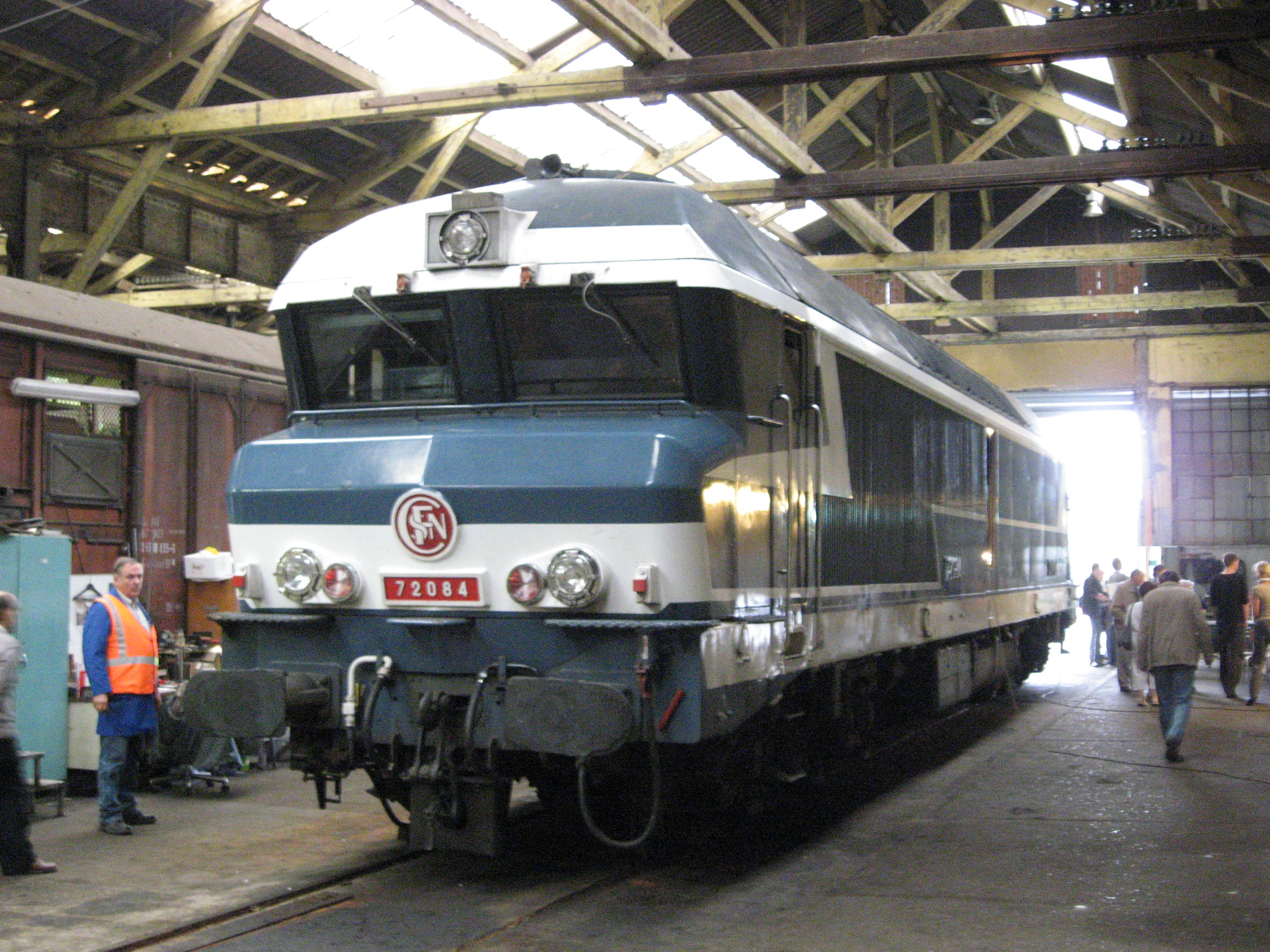
- A preserved Class CC 72000 locomotive

Overview
- Service type: Trans Europ Express (TEE)
- Status: Replaced by a TGV
- Locale: France
- First service: 29 September 1980
- Last service: 22 September 1989
- Former operator: SNCF

Route
- Termini: Paris-Montparnasse; Nantes
- Stops: 1
- Distance travelled: 395.1 km (245.5 mi)
- Train number: TEE 31, 30
- Lines used: Paris–Brest; Le Mans-Angers; Tours–Saint-Nazaire.

On-board services
- Class: First-class-only

Technical
- Rolling stock: SNCF Class CC 72000 / SNCF Class BB 22200; DEV Inox coaches / Grand Confort coaches
- Track gauge: 1,435 mm (4 ft 8 1/2 in)
- Electrification: 1.5 kV DC; 25 kV AC

The Jules Verne was an express train that linked Paris and Nantes in France. Operated by the Société Nationale des Chemins de fer français (SNCF), it was the last new Trans Europ Express (TEE) to be introduced, in 1980.

The train was named after the French author Jules Verne, who was born in Nantes. It was replaced by a TGV in 1989.

== Route ==
The Jules Verne's route was via the Paris–Brest railway as far as Le Mans, then via the Le Mans–Angers railway and finally via the Tours–Saint-Nazaire railway. The train had the following stops:

- Paris-Montparnasse – Angers-Saint-Laud – Nantes

The train operated on weekdays only. Starting in autumn 1983 the westbound train ran as a TEE on Mondays through Thursdays only and was replaced by a two-class Rapide on Fridays.

== Formation (consist) ==
Initially, Jules Verne was usually hauled by one of SNCF's Class CC 72000 diesel-electric locomotives. This class was later replaced by SNCF dual voltage, Class BB 22200 electric locomotives. Prior to that change, made in autumn 1983, the Jules Verne had been the last train in the TEE network to be regularly diesel-hauled. However, Belgian diesel locomotives continued to be used occasionally on TEE trains between Brussels and Amsterdam.

The train's original formation of rolling stock was a rake of SNCF Mistral 69-type DEV Inox coaches, being an A4Dtux, two A8u, two A8tu, one A3rtu and one Vru.

On 10 May 1982, the train's rolling stock was replaced by SNCF Grand Confort coaches, which were otherwise in the same formation. The Grand Confort coaches were painted in a distinctive red, orange, light grey and slate grey livery.

Throughout the Jules Verne's existence, its dining car was staffed by the Compagnie Internationale des Wagons-Lits (CIWL).

== See also ==
- History of rail transport in France
- List of named passenger trains of Europe
