= Quinzinzinzili =

1935 novel by Régis Messac

Quinzinzinzili is a science fiction novel written in 1935 by the French author Régis Messac (1893 - 1945). This was one of the first post-cataclysmic novels.

At the time of World War II (which Messac anticipated), a Japanese scientist develops a chemical reaction that combines the oxygen and nitrogen in the atmosphere. The air becomes unbreathable for the majority of species, and humanity is swept with mass extinction. Ten children left in a deep cave survive and find the purified Earth. The man who accompanies them, their tutor, witnesses the creation of a new humanity.

First publication in English as Quinzinzinzany in two instalments, in Visions #1 (2018) and Visions #2 (2019). Translation by Mathieu Triay, with illustrations by Jean-Albert Triay.
