= Interdiscourse =

Implicit or explicit relations that a discourse has to other discourses

Interdiscourse is the implicit or explicit relations that a discourse has to other discourses. Interdiscursivity is the aspect of a discourse that relates it to other discourses. Norman Fairclough prefers the concept "orders of discourse". Interdiscursivity is often mostly an analytic concept, e.g. in Foucault and Fairclough. Interdiscursivity has close affinity to recontextualisation because interdiscourse often implies that elements are imported from another discourse.

The meaning of interdiscourse varies. It denotes at least three levels:

1. In Courtine interdiscursivity means that a discourse has a relation to another discourse. That is, a meaning which is close to the meaning of intertextuality.
2. In Norman Fairclough and Linell interdiscursive denotes relations between types of discourse such as genres.
3. In Michel Foucault and Marc Angenot, interdiscursive denotes relations between discursive formations, that is, between large heterogeneous discursive entities, such as natural history and political economy during enlightenment. In Michel Foucault, interdiscourse is differences and equalities across discursive formations.

An example (where 1. corresponds to a., etc.) illustrates the three levels: A minister of environment speaks in the parliament about a proposal.

- a. She refers to other specific speeches in the parliament about the proposal.
- b. She refers to a memorandum from her civil servants.
- c. She refers to scientific reports supporting the proposal.

The example illustrates that 2. and 3. are specific cases of 1, in the sense a-c all relate to another discourse. To avoid this, level 1. might be defined as relations to other discourses within the same discursive formation and type of discourse. Consequently, the definition of the levels depends on the definition of discursive formation and types of discourse, and the three levels may collapse to the extent that these concepts are not conceived. In short, the stratification of interdiscourse depends on the stratification of discourse.

== Power, ideology and interdiscursive configuration ==
Level 2. and 3. may be conceived as particularly salient. This is explained in Marc Angenot and Bruce by reference to Bakhtin: In Bakhtin's dialogism, the utterance is the natural meaningful and finalised unit of speech, which others are supposed to respond to, that is, others interpret the utterance by situating it in a discursive context. But, an utterance may be interpreted (contextualised) in various ways, and interdiscourse and interdiscursivity denote how certain such interpretations (and relations to other discourses) are socially more privileged than others. Since interdiscourse privileges certain interpretations, it has a close affinity to the concepts of ideology, hegemony and power (sociology). For Bakhtin/Voloshinov, signs are a reality that refracts another reality, that is, signs are ideological. Therefore, the embedding of a discourse in an interdiscourse is an ideological interpretation of the discourse.

In Michel Foucault, interdiscursivity is not bound to ideology, but is a more open concept for analysing relations between discursive formations, that is, mapping their interdiscursive configuration. Such analyses constitute a part of his discourse analysis.

The cogent and restrictive character of the interdiscourse is reflected in the concept of the primacy of interdiscourse. The interdiscourse is the sayable, the opposite of what cannot be enunciated (l'inénoncable). But, the interdiscourse has also primacy in the sense that it defines the relations between discursive entities (or formations) that are constitutive of the discursive entities. What is acceptable discourse, is in many respects a matter of interdiscursivity at level 2 and 3, because the interdiscursive import and export relations constitute a worksharing between the discursive entities, and this frames what is acceptable discourse within each discursive entity: Generally, a discourse has little authority over what other discourses are assumed to speak of and will therefore accept imported form and content from the other discourses. On the other hand, when a discourse exports content to other discourses, there are expectations as to the exported form and content. Thus, the interdiscursive system shapes the discourses.
