= Château de Montreuil-Bellay =

Historical building in Montreuil-Bellay, France

Coordinates: 47°8′0″N 0°9′15″W

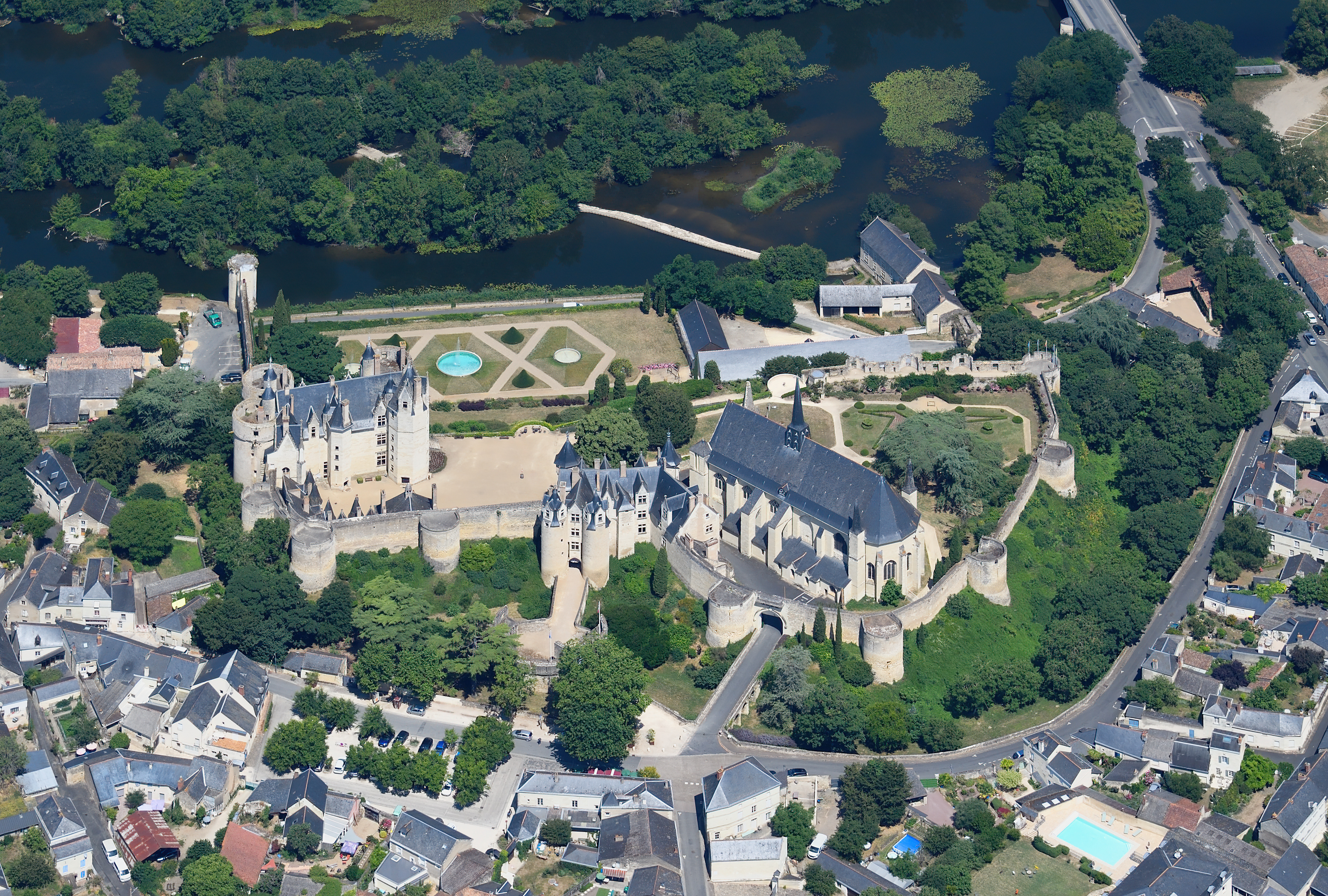
Aerial view of the Château de Montreuil-Bellay

The Château de Montreuil-Bellay is a historical building in the town of Montreuil-Bellay, département of Maine-et-Loire, France, first built on the site of a Gallo-Roman village high on a hill on the banks of the Thouet River. It is listed as a monument historique by the French Ministry of Culture.

During the medieval period the property, consisting of more than 4 km^{2} (990 acres), was part of a group of 32 villages near-by that created the then known as "L'Anjou". The Mountreil-Bellay fief, first belonged to Gelduin le Danois afterward by regal heredity passed to Berlay le Vieux who became the first Sir of Bellay, in 1025 the castle was seized by Foulques Nerra a Plantagenet making Giraud Berlay his vassal during the second half of the 12th century. After the defeat of the English by Philip II, the fief returned to a descendant of the Berlay le Vieux family Sir of Bellay, Guillaume de Melun, during this period the fief went under a big renovation by the creation of high massive walls construction including 13 interlocking towers, with entry only via a fortified gateway and the name was anglicized from Barley to Balley.

During the French Wars of Religion (1562–1598) the town of Montreuil-Bellay was ransacked and burned but the sturdy fortress suffered little damage. Ownership of the castle changed several times including, through marriage, to the Cossé-Brissac family. During the French Revolution the castle was seized by the revolutionary government and used as a prison for women suspected of being royalists.

In 1822 the property was acquired by Saumur businessman Adrien Niveleau, who divided the huge property into rental units. In 1860 Niveleau's daughter undertook occupancy and a major restoration campaign, redoing some of the rooms in the Troubadour style. Descendants of her husband's nephew are the current owners of the property.

Nowadays, Château de Montreuil-Bellay is also the name of a premium wine made on the property.

== Images ==
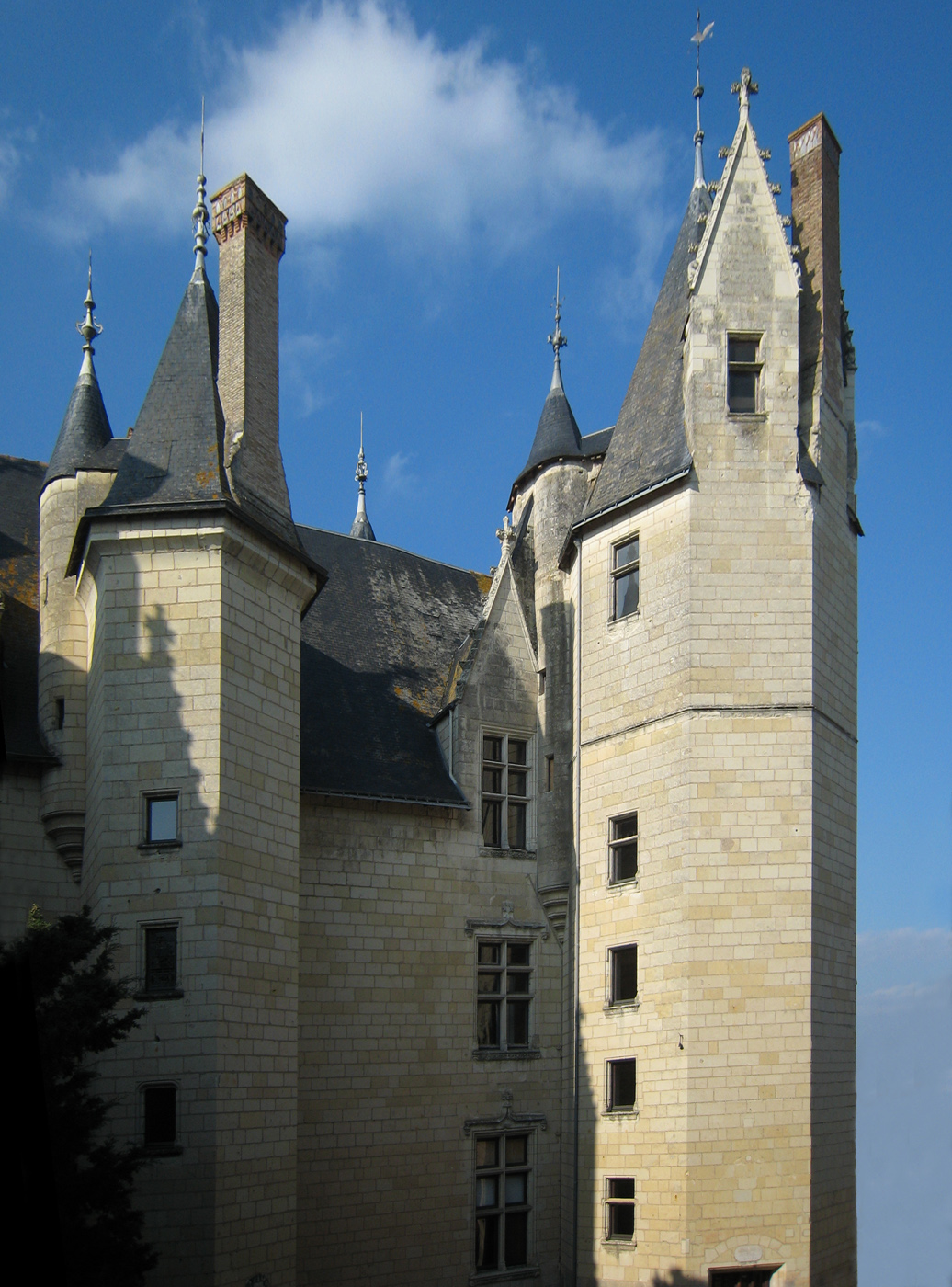

== See also ==
- List of castles in France
