= Transtextuality =

Literary concept

Transtextuality was defined by Gérard Genette as the "textual transcendence of the text", that is "everything that brings it [the text] into relation (manifest or hidden) with other texts". Genette distinguished five types of transtextual relationships, namely:

- intertextuality, that is, "a relationship of copresence between two texts or among several texts: that is to say, eidetically and typically [...] the actual presence of one text within another". Genette mentions quoting, plagiarism and allusion as examples. In Genette's conceptualisation transtextuality is thus a hypernym of intertextuality ("I include under it intertextuality in the strict [...] sense"). At the same time, he uses 'intertextuality' "no doubt in a more restrictive sense" than usual by providing a separate label for the more comprehensive forms of intertextuality that he calls 'hypertextual' (see below).
- paratextuality, that is, the "relationship that binds the text properly speaking [...] to what can be called its paratext: a title, a subtitle, intertitles; prefaces, postfaces, notices, forewords, etc.; marginal infrapaginal, terminal notes; epigraphs; illustrations; blurbs, book covers, dust jackets, and many other kinds of secondary signals, whether allographic or autographic" ^{(cf.} ^{)}.
- metatextuality, that is, "the relationship most often labeled 'commentary'".
- architextuality, that is, "the entire set of general or transcendent categories – types of discourse, modes of enunciation, literary genres - from which emerges each singular text" ^{(cf.} ^{)}.
- hypertextuality, that is, "any relationship uniting a text B (which I shall call the hypertext) to an earlier text A (I shall, of course, call it the hypotext), upon which it is grafted in a manner that is not that of commentary". In an earlier formulation, Genette had mentioned "imitation and transformation, which pastiche and parody can give us an idea of", but had still called these relationships 'paratextual'. In another complication, 'hypertextuality' as used by Genette must not be confused with hypertext. It seems fitting that Genette's book on hypertextuality starts with a footnote which refers back to his earlier book on architextuality (in which 'hypertextuality' was still called 'paratextuality'), followed by another footnote which ironically complains that it "is high time that some High Commissioner of the Republic of Letters be appointed to enforce a coherent and consistent terminology" (see above wrt. 'intertextuality').

== See also ==
- Intertextuality
- Paratextuality
- Metatextuality
- Architextuality
- Gérard Genette
