= Montreuil-Bellay =

- Commune
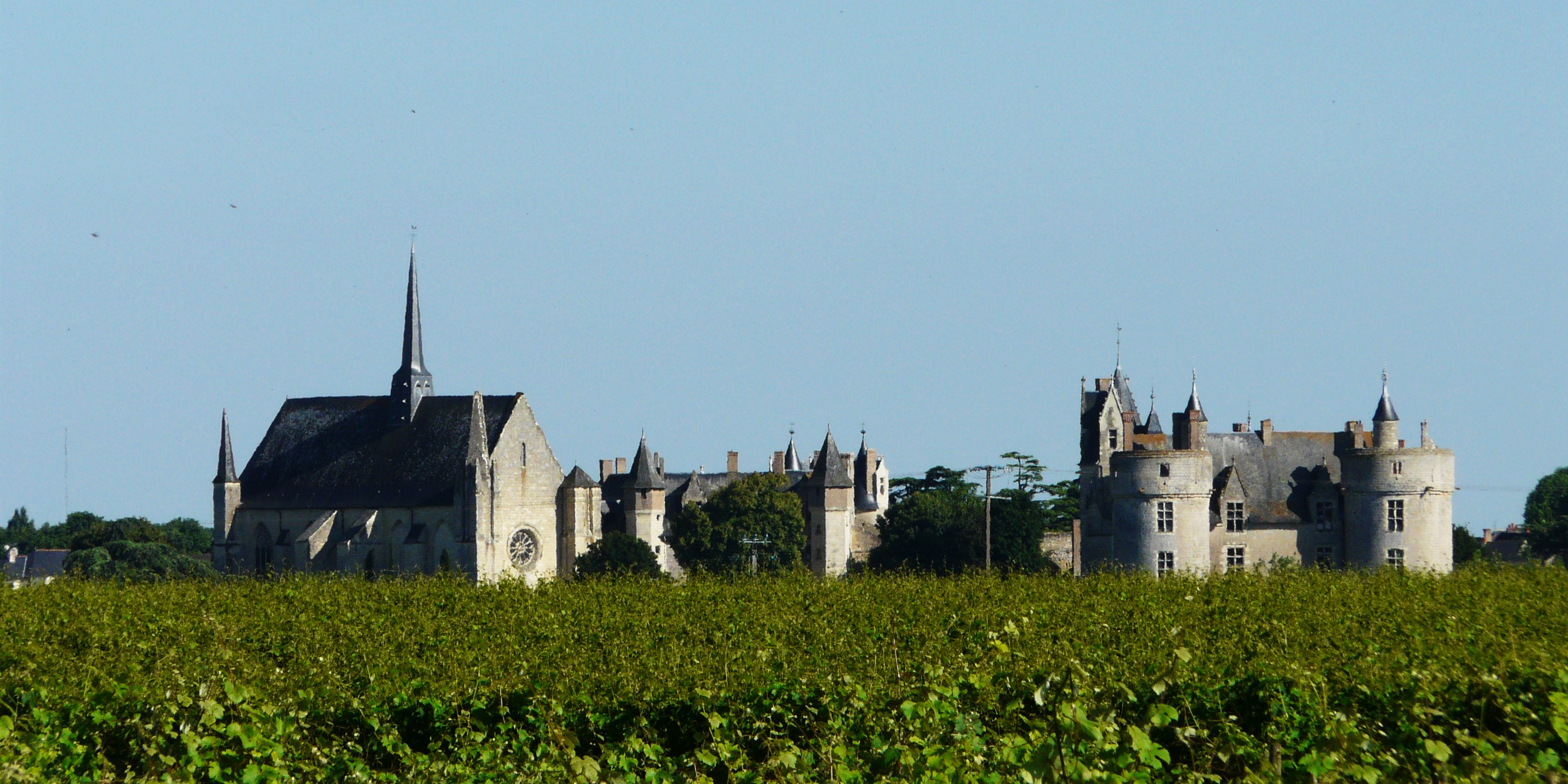
- A general view of Montreuil-Bellay

- Coat of arms
- Location of Montreuil-Bellay
- Location within France Location within Pays de la Loire
- Coordinates: 47°07′56″N 0°09′08″W
- Country: France
- Region: Pays de la Loire
- Department: Maine-et-Loire
- Arrondissement: Saumur
- Canton: Doué-en-Anjou
- Intercommunality: CA Saumur Val de Loire

Government
  - Mayor (2020–2026): Marc Bonnin
- Area^{1}: 48.96 km^{2} (18.90 sq mi)
- Elevation: 54 m (177 ft)
- Highest elevation: 73 m (240 ft)
- Lowest elevation: 29 m (95 ft)
- Population (2023): 3,746
  - Density: 76.51/km^{2} (198.2/sq mi)
- Demonym(s): Montreuillais, Montreuillaise
- Time zone: UTC+01:00 (CET)
  - Summer (DST): UTC+02:00 (CEST)
- INSEE/Postal code: 49215 /49260
- Website: Official website
- ^{1} French Land Register data, which excludes lakes, ponds, glaciers > 1 km^{2} (0.386 sq mi or 247 acres) and river estuaries.

Montreuil-Bellay (French pronunciation: [mɔ̃tʁœj bɛlɛ]) is a commune in the Maine-et-Loire department in western France.

It is located approximately 15 km to the south of Saumur, and is famous for the Château de Montreuil-Bellay, which is situated in the town.

Montreuil-Bellay is on the Thouet, and was the head of navigation until navigation ceased at the beginning of the 20th century. The navigation works were undertaken in the 15th century by the lords of Montreuil-Bellay, who in turn were granted letters patent by King Charles VII allowing them to raise a tax on wine that would pass through their land. Montreuil-Bellay station has rail connections to Tours, Saumur, Bressuire and La Roche-sur-Yon.

== Population ==
Historical population
Year	Pop.	±% p.a.
1968	3,086	—
1975	3,989	+3.73%
1982	4,093	+0.37%
1990	4,041	−0.16%
1999	4,112	+0.19%
2007	4,045	−0.21%
2012	4,032	−0.06%
2017	3,822	−1.06%
2023	3,746	−0.33%
Source: INSEE

== See also ==
- Communes of the Maine-et-Loire department
