= Jules Verne Museum =

Museum in Nantes, France

Coordinates: 47.201616°N 1.577347°W

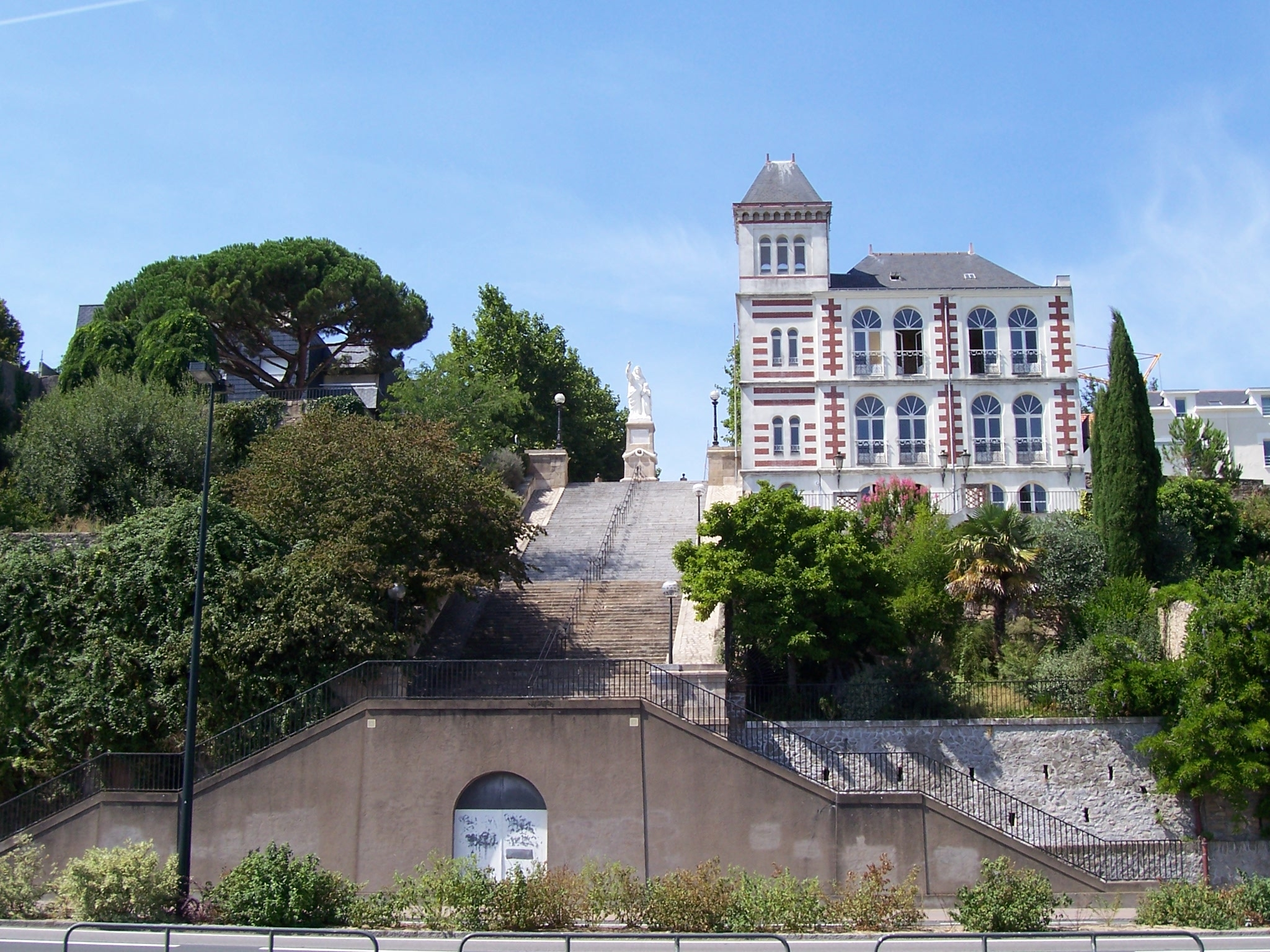
The Jules Verne Museum located on the side of a cliff in Nantes.

The Musée Jules Verne is a museum dedicated to the French writer Jules Verne. It is located in the city of Nantes, France, and was opened in 1978 to mark the 150th anniversary of Verne's birth. The painter Jean Bruneau, helped by Luce Courville, curator of the municipal library, joined forces to open this museum.

== Description ==
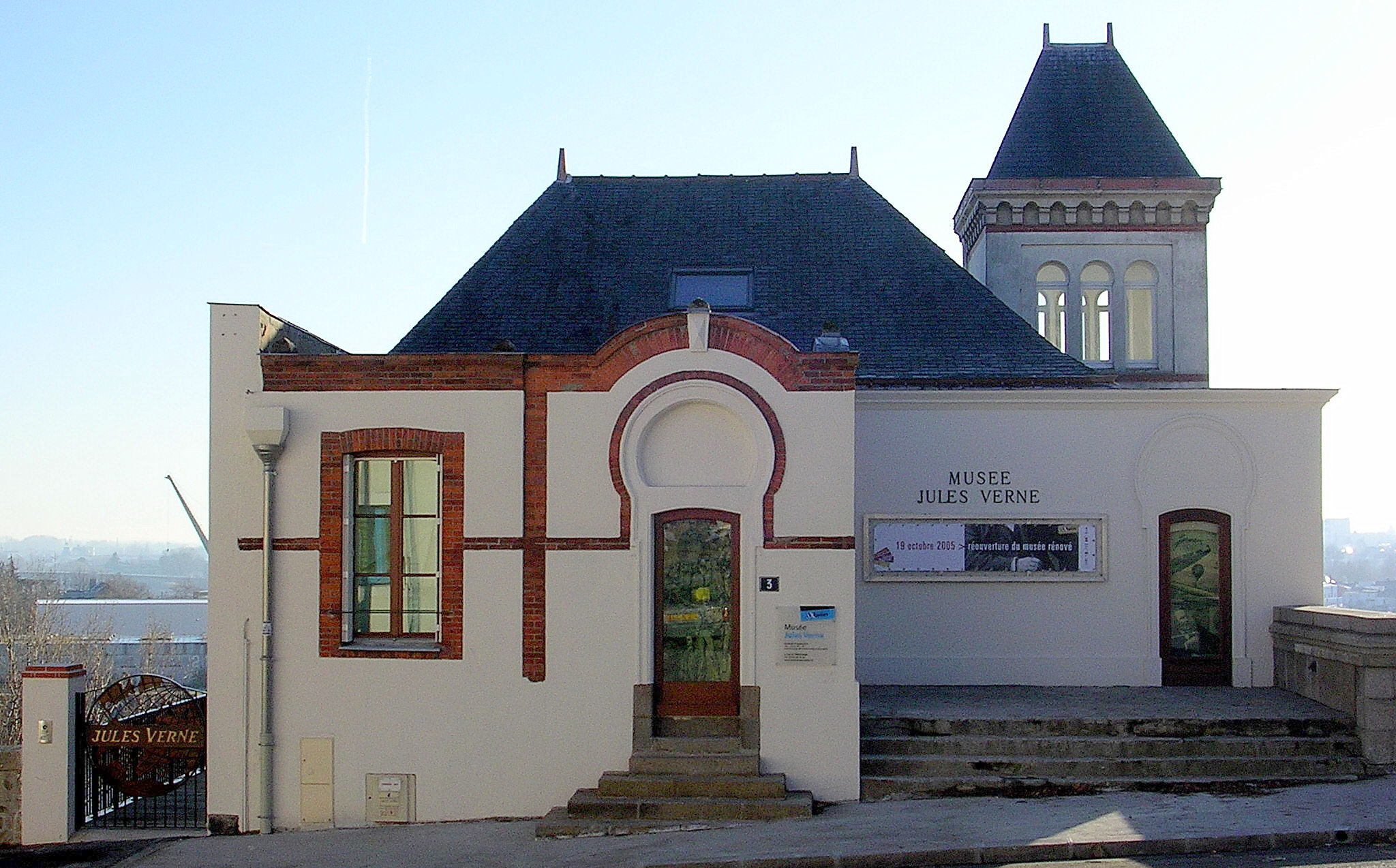
Museum entrance

The museum is housed in a late 19th-century building overlooking the river Loire. While Verne never lived in the building, its surroundings reflect the atmosphere which influenced his work. His parents had a house in nearby Bas-Chantenay.

The building, divided into several apartments during the 20th century, was gradually bought by the City of Nantes: in 1965, for the upper part, and in 1973, for the lower part.

A large collection of artifacts, replicas of his inventions, and memorabilia inspired by his writings can be found in the museum. The museum is divided into eight themed rooms:

1. Jules Verne's drawing room; featuring chairs and the clock from his own drawing room. His china on display in the room was donated to the City of Nantes by Verne's descendants. Throughout his career, Verne received the china as gifts from foreign journalists.
2. The start of dreams
3. The sea, the sea
4. The two Jules
5. Known and unknown worlds
6. The Voyagers on stage
7. Reading and games room
8. Audiovisual room

The building was renovated in 2005, the centenary of Verne's death. Consequence of the transformation of the urban community into a metropolis, it becomes a metropolitan facility on January 1, 2015.

== Location ==
The museum is located at 3, rue de l'Hermitage, Nantes.

== Gallery ==
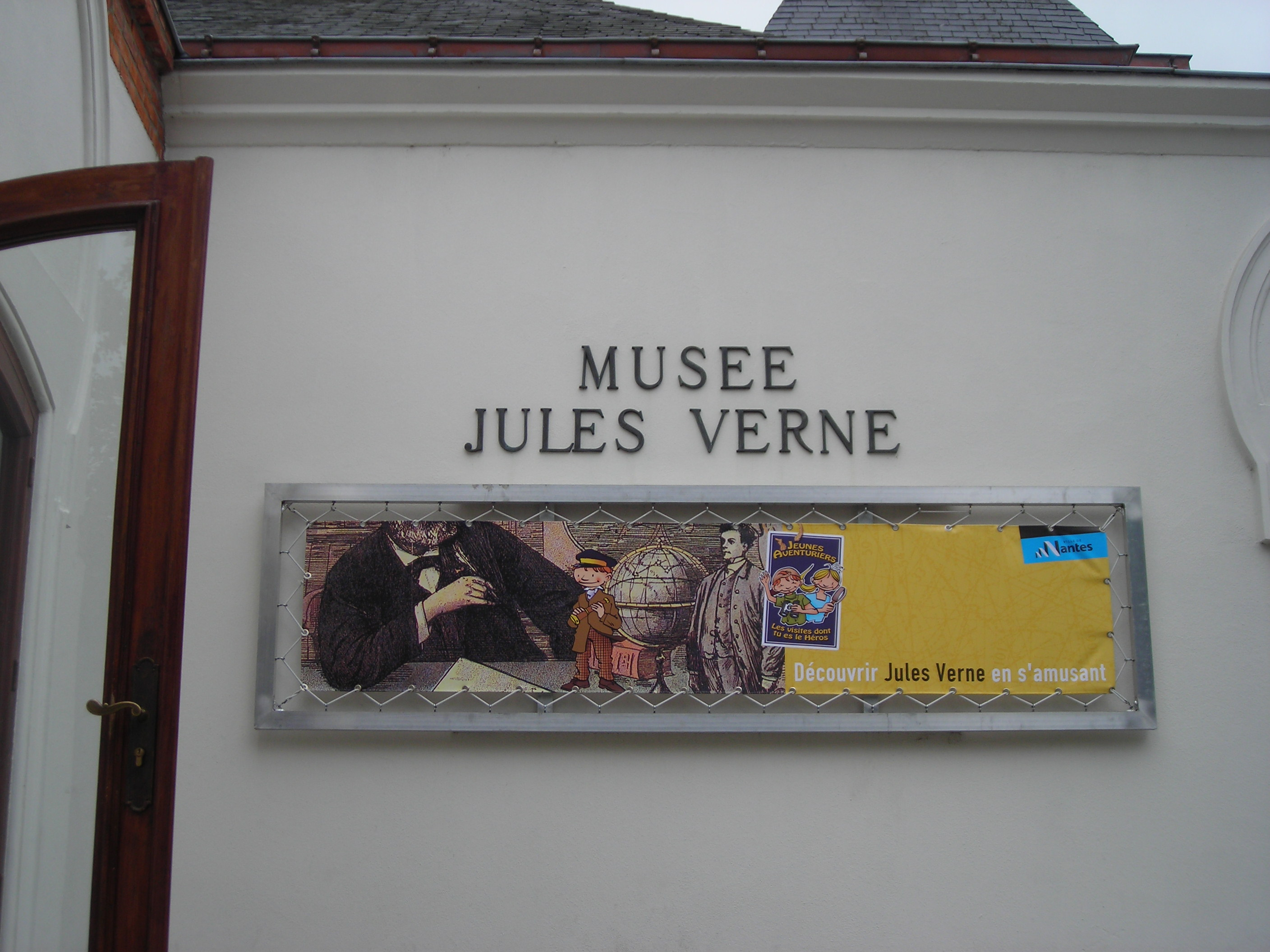
Jules Verne Museum, Nantes, France

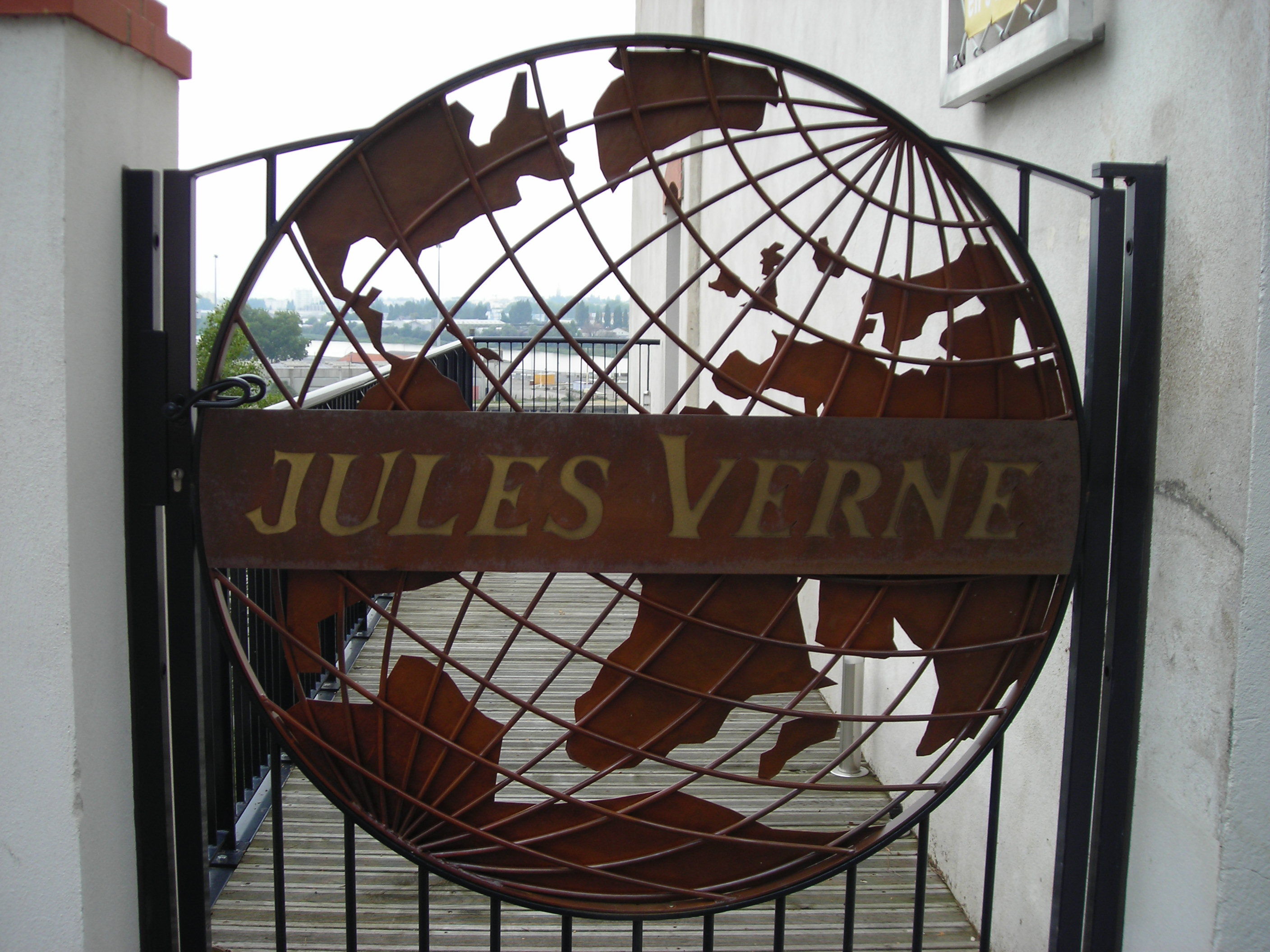
The Loire River seen through an iron gate

== Externals links ==
- Official website
- Musée Jules Verne on Nantes Tourist Office website
