= Intertextuality =

Shaping of a text's meaning by another text in literary studies

Intertextuality is the shaping of a text's meaning by another text, either through deliberate compositional strategies such as quotation, allusion, calque, plagiarism, translation, pastiche or parody, or by interconnections between similar or related works perceived by an audience or reader of the text. These references are sometimes made deliberately and depend on a reader's prior knowledge and understanding of the referent, but the effect of intertextuality is not always intentional and is sometimes inadvertent. Often associated with strategies employed by writers working in imaginative registers (fiction, poetry, and drama and even non-written texts like performance art and digital media), intertextuality may now be understood as intrinsic to any text.

Intertextuality has been differentiated into referential and typological categories. Referential intertextuality refers to the use of fragments in texts and the typological intertextuality refers to the use of pattern and structure in typical texts. A distinction can also be made between iterability and presupposition. Iterability makes reference to the "repeatability" of certain text that is composed of "traces", pieces of other texts that help constitute its meaning. Presupposition makes a reference to assumptions a text makes about its readers and its context. As philosopher William Irwin wrote, the term "has come to have almost as many meanings as users, from those faithful to Julia Kristeva's original vision to those who simply use it as a stylish way of talking about allusion and influence".

== History ==
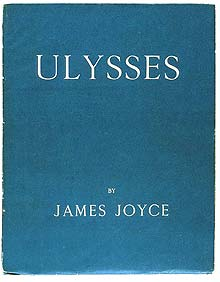
James Joyce's 1922 novel Ulysses bears an intertextual relationship to Homer's Odyssey.

Julia Kristeva coined the term "intertextuality" (intertextualité) in an attempt to synthesize Ferdinand de Saussure's semiotics: his study of how signs derive their meaning from the structure of a text (Bakhtin's dialogism); his theory suggests a continual dialogue with other works of literature and other authors; and his examination of the multiple meanings, or "heteroglossia", of texts (especially novels) or individual words. According to Kristeva, "the notion of intertextuality replaces the notion of intersubjectivity" when we realize that meaning is not transferred directly from writer to reader but is instead mediated or filtered by "codes" imparted to the writer and reader by other texts. For example, when we read James Joyce's Ulysses we decode it as a modernist literary experiment or as a response to the epic tradition, or as part of some other conversation, or as part of many conversations at once. This intertextual view of literature, as shown by Roland Barthes, supports the concept that the meaning of a text does not reside in the text, but is produced by the reader in relation both to the text in question and the complex network of texts evoked by the reading process.

While the theoretical concept of intertextuality is associated with post-modernism, the device itself is not new. New Testament passages quote from the Old Testament and Old Testament books such as Deuteronomy or the prophets refer to the events described in Exodus (for discussions on using 'intertextuality' to describe the use of the Old Testament in the New Testament, see Porter 1997; Oropeza 2013; Oropeza & Moyise, 2016). Whereas a redaction critic would use such intertextuality to argue for a particular order and process of the authorship of the books in question, literary criticism takes a synchronic view that deals with the texts in their final form, as an interconnected body of literature. This interconnected body extends to later poems and paintings that refer to Biblical narratives, just as other texts build networks around Greek and Roman Classical history and mythology.

=== Post-structuralism ===
More recent post-structuralist theory, such as that formulated in Daniela Caselli's Beckett's Dantes: Intertextuality in the Fiction and Criticism (MUP 2005), re-examines "intertextuality" as a production within texts, rather than as a series of relationships between different texts. Some postmodern theorists like to talk about the relationship between "intertextuality" and "hypertextuality" (not to be confused with hypertext, another semiotic term coined by Gérard Genette); intertextuality makes each text a "living hell of hell on earth" and part of a larger mosaic of texts, just as each hypertext can be a web of links and part of the whole World-Wide Web. The World-Wide Web has been theorized as a unique realm of reciprocal intertextuality, in which no particular text can claim centrality, yet the Web text eventually produces an image of a community—the group of people who write and read the text using specific discursive strategies.

== Examples in literature ==
Some examples of intertextuality in literature include:

- Perhaps the earliest example of a non-anonymous author alluding to another is when Euripides, in his Electra (410s BC), spoofs (in lines 524–38) the recognition scene from Aeschylus's The Libation Bearers.
- The House of Asterion (1947) by Jorge Luis Borges: A retelling of the Greek myth of Theseus and the Minotaur told from the perspective of Asterion, the Minotaur.
- East of Eden (1952) by John Steinbeck: A retelling of the account of Genesis, set in the Salinas Valley of Northern California.
- Ulysses (1922) by James Joyce: A retelling of Homer's Odyssey, set in Dublin.
- Absalom, Absalom! (1936) by William Faulkner: A retelling of the Absalom story from Samuel, set in antebellum Mississippi.
- Earthly Powers (1980) by Anthony Burgess: A retelling of Anatole France's Le Miracle du grand saint Nicolas during the 20th century.
- The Dead Fathers Club (2006) by Matt Haig: A retelling of Shakespeare's Hamlet, set in modern England.
- A Thousand Acres (1991) by Jane Smiley: A retelling of Shakespeare's King Lear, set in rural Iowa.
- Perelandra (1943) by C. S. Lewis: Another retelling of the account of Genesis, also leaning on Milton's Paradise Lost, but set on the planet Venus.
- Wide Sargasso Sea (1966) by Jean Rhys: A metatextual intervention on Charlotte Brontë's Jane Eyre, the story of the "mad woman in the attic" told from her perspective.
- The Legend of Bagger Vance (1996) by Steven Pressfield: A retelling of the Bhagavad Gita, set in 1931 during an epic golf game.
- Bridget Jones's Diary (1996) by Helen Fielding: A modern "chick lit" romantic comedy replaying and referencing Jane Austen's Pride and Prejudice.
- Tortilla Flat (1935) by John Steinbeck: A retelling of the Arthurian legends, set in Monterey, California, during the interwar period.
- Mourning Becomes Electra (1931) by Eugene O'Neill: A retelling of Aeschylus' The Oresteia, set in post-American Civil War New England.
- The Gospel of Matthew narrates the early years of the life of Jesus while following a pattern from the Hebrew Bible's Book of Exodus.
- Frankissstein (2019) by Jeanette Winterson: A retelling of Mary Shelley's 1818 classic Frankenstein, examining updated issues of the monstrous, i.e. sex-bots and cryonics.

=== Related concepts ===
Linguist Norman Fairclough states that "intertextuality is a matter of recontextualization". According to Per Linell, recontextualization can be defined as the "dynamic transfer-and-transformation of something from one discourse/text-in-context ... to another". Recontextualization can be relatively explicit—for example, when one text directly quotes another—or relatively implicit—as when the "same" generic meaning is rearticulated across different texts.

A number of scholars have observed that recontextualization can have important ideological and political consequences. For instance, Adam Hodges has studied how White House officials recontextualized and altered a military general's comments for political purposes, highlighting favorable aspects of the general's utterances while downplaying the damaging aspects. Rhetorical scholar Jeanne Fahnestock has found that when popular magazines recontextualize scientific research they enhance the uniqueness of the scientific findings and confer greater certainty on the reported facts. Similarly, John Oddo stated that American reporters covering Colin Powell's 2003 U.N. speech transformed Powell's discourse as they recontextualized it, bestowing Powell's allegations with greater certainty and warrantability and even adding new evidence to support Powell's claims.

Oddo has also argued that recontextualization has a future-oriented counterpoint, which he dubs "precontextualization". According to Oddo, precontextualization is a form of anticipatory intertextuality wherein "a text introduces and predicts elements of a symbolic event that is yet to unfold". For example, Oddo contends, American journalists anticipated and previewed Colin Powell's U.N. address, drawing his future discourse into the normative present.

=== Allusion ===
While intertextuality is a complex and multileveled literary term, it is often confused with the more casual term 'allusion'. Allusion is a passing or casual reference; an incidental mention of something, either directly or by implication. This means it is most closely linked to both obligatory and accidental intertextuality, as the 'allusion' made relies on the listener or viewer knowing about the original source. It is also seen as accidental, however, as the allusion is normally a phrase so frequently or casually used that the true significance is not fully appreciated. Allusion is most often used in conversation, dialogue or metaphor. For example, "I was surprised his nose was not growing like Pinocchio's." This makes a reference to The Adventures of Pinocchio, written by Carlo Collodi when the little wooden puppet lies. If this was obligatory intertextuality in a text, multiple references to this (or other novels of the same theme) would be used throughout the hypertext.

== Plagiarism ==
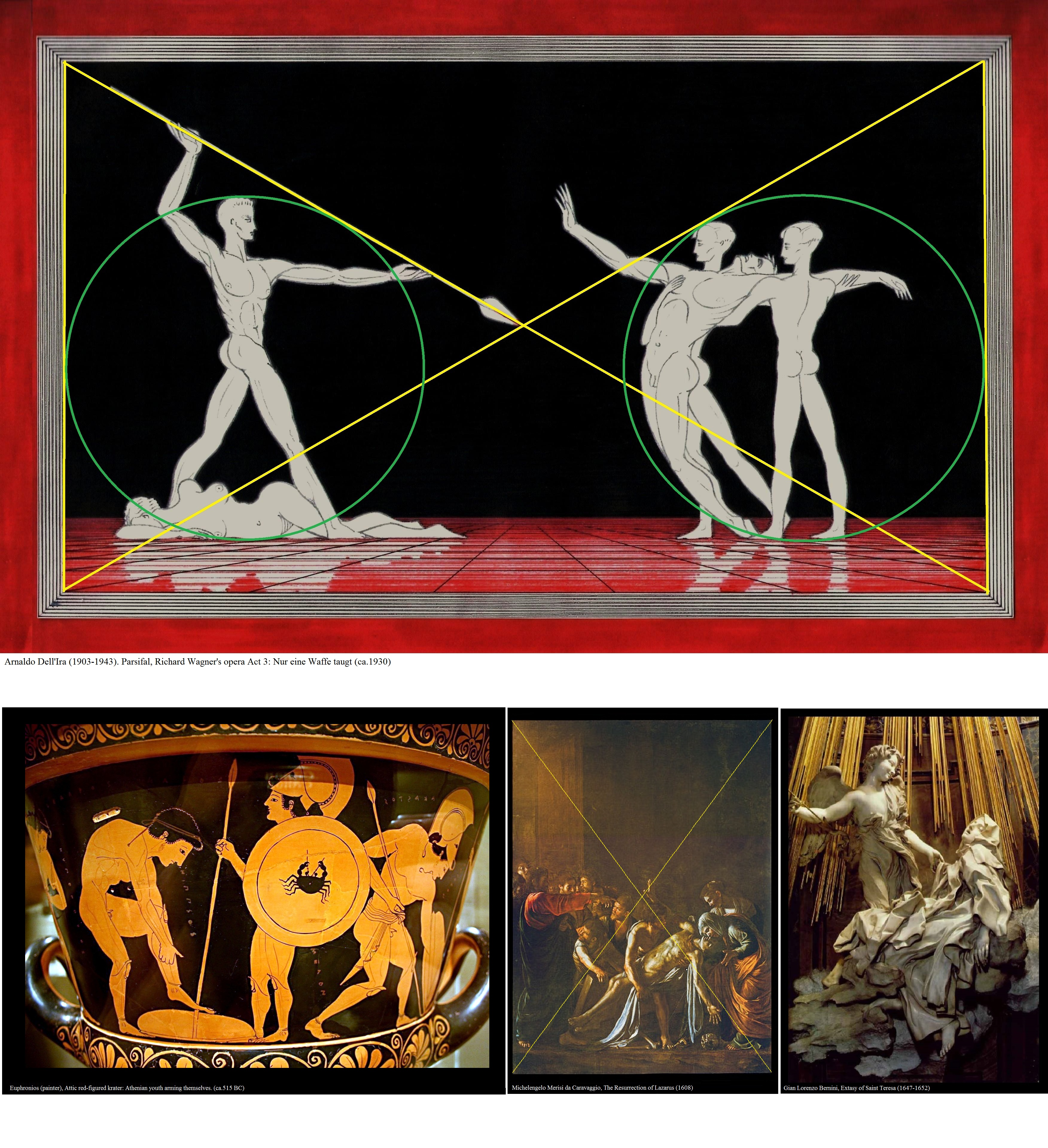
Intertextuality in art: "Nur eine Waffe taugt" (Richard Wagner, Parsifal, act III), by Arnaldo dell'Ira, ca. 1930

Sociologist Perry Share describes intertextuality as "an area of considerable ethical complexity". Intertextuality does not necessarily involve citations or referencing punctuation (such as quotation marks) and can be mistaken for plagiarism. While the two concepts are related, the intentions behind using another's work is critical in distinguishing the two. When making use of intertextuality, usually a small excerpt of a hypotext assists in the understanding of the new hypertext's original themes, characters, or contexts. Aspects of existing texts are reused, often resulting in new meaning when placed in a different context. Intertextuality hinges on the creation of new ideas, while plagiarism attempts to pass off existing work as one's own.

Students learning to write often rely on imitation or emulation and have not yet learned how to reformulate sources and cite them according to expected standards, and thus engage in forms of "patchwriting," which may be inappropriately penalized as intentional plagiarism. Because the interests of writing studies differ from the interests of literary theory, the concept has been elaborated differently with an emphasis on writers using intertextuality to position their statement in relation to other statements and prior knowledge. Students often find it difficult to learn how to combine referencing and relying on others' words with marking their novel perspective and contribution.

As a new era of education emerges with the use of artificial intelligence, intertextuality and the plagiarism hidden within evolve. Researchers suggest artificial intelligence is written using a variety of inputs which allows for the AI search to be unaffected so long as the original author is credited. In both non-transgressive (writing that builds upon work) and transgressive writing (writing that challenges work), using multiple sources builds upon literature and is a good expression of writing. Generally, utilizing multiple sources is good writing practice, unless the main source is AI compilation of data. AI uses others’ work which means the AI is an artificial source compiling other sources into one. However, this type of intertextuality may be flagged as plagiarism as it comes from artificial intelligence and not one true human source. Students continue to use artificial sources like this accidentally while writing. With the new integration of technology, many students use an intertextual strategy in their writing and many education systems have shifted their curriculum and standards to accommodate for this leap in modern education.

As bilingual students learn to write at higher levels, they turn to multiple sources for a more well rounded sense of understanding and inspiration due to their language barrier. Students learning English most commonly rely on their exposure to English media, while another less common approach is the use of intertextuality to improve their essay. These students focused on outside academic sources may fall into the trap of unknowingly using plagiarized information because of the lack of their understanding of the "politics of text and knowledge construction". With a language barrier, integration to academic writing is a learning process involving writers being able to use intertextuality to their advantage to make their own identity.

== Non-literary uses ==
In addition, the concept of intertextuality has been used analytically outside the sphere of literature and art. For example, Devitt (1991) examined how the various genres of letters composed by tax accountants refer to the tax codes in genre-specific ways. In another example, Christensen (2016) introduces the concept of intertextuality to the analysis of work practice at a hospital. The study shows that the ensemble of documents used and produced at a hospital department can be said to form a corpus of written texts. On the basis of the corpus, or subsections thereof, the actors in cooperative work create intertext between relevant (complementary) texts in a particular situation, for a particular purpose. The intertext of a particular situation can be constituted by several kinds of intertextuality, including the complementary type, the intratextual type and the mediated type. In this manner the concept of intertext has had an impact beyond literature and art studies.

In scientific and other scholarly writing intertextuality is core to the collaborative nature of knowledge building and thus citation practices are important to the social organization of fields, the codification of knowledge, and the reward system for professional contribution. Scientists can be skillfully intentional in the use of references to prior work in order to position the contribution of their work. Modern practices of scientific citation, however, have only developed since the late eighteenth century and vary across fields, in part influenced by disciplines’ epistemologies.

== See also ==
- Citationality
- Détournement
- Honkadori
- Interdiscursivity
- Julia Kristeva
- Literary theory
- Meta
- Post-structuralism
- Semiotics
- The Shape of Time: Remarks on the History of Things
- Transmedia storytelling
- Transtextuality
- Type scene
- Umberto Eco
