= Wayne Reinagel =

American author and graphic artist (born 1961)

- Born: May 7, 1961 (age 65); Collinsville, Illinois, U.S.
- Occupation: Writer/Graphic Artist/Publisher
- Writing career
- Genres: Gothic horror, historical fiction, pulp adventure, steampunk
- Website: pulpheroesmorethanmortal.webs.com

Wayne Reinagel (born May 7, 1961) is an American author and graphic artist, primarily known for his historical fiction novels.

== Biography ==
Reinagel was raised and still lives in Collinsville, Illinois, in the United States.

== Career ==
Reinagel is the author/illustrator of the Pulp Heroes and Modern Marvels series of pulp adventure novels and short stories. As the artist of the books, he has provided seventy-five full-color interior illustrations featuring faux covers of non-existent magazines, mimicking the style of art from the pulp era.

A member of the Pulp Factory writers and artists group, Reinagel's classic pulp revival novels and short stories are being published by Knightraven Studios.

In early 2011, Reinagel was nominated for the "Writer of the Year" Award by the membership of PulpArk, an Arkansas-based pulp convention. His novel Pulp Heroes – Khan Dynasty was also nominated for "Best Novel," "Best Cover Art," and "Best Interior Illustrations." Pulp Heroes – Khan Dynasty was also nominated for "Best Novel" by the members of the Pulp Factory, awarded at the Windy City Pulp and Paperback Convention in Chicago each spring.

== Pulp Heroes series ==
Beginning in 2007, Reinagel began writing a multi-volume series of Steampulp fiction novels, short stories, and anthologies. The books are set in the 1930s and 1940s but include a series of flashbacks that date as far back as 1800. The first Pulp Heroes trilogy of novels are subtitled More Than Mortal, Khan Dynasty, and Sanctuary Falls. Each volume of the series stands alone as a single adventure or the books can be read together as an ongoing, continuous narrative in which the characters grow and change. These novels are the first published works in the Steampulp genre, a combination of classic Victorian era Steampunk and the 1930s −1940's heroic Pulp Fiction. Steampulp was a description first coined by Reinagel during a 2008 interview while describing the premise of the Pulp Heroes novels that involve several generations of heroes spanning a period of time from the early 1800s through 1949.

== Modern Marvels series ==
Following the more traditional Steampunk outline, Modern Marvels – Viktoriana is a combination of Gothic horror and action-adventure set in the year 1888, and features a wide assortment of real-life characters appropriate to the time period, including Jules Verne, Mary Shelley, H.G. Wells, Bram Stoker, Arthur Conan Doyle, H. Rider Haggard, Edgar Allan Poe, Nikola Tesla and Harry Houdini. Two further Modern Marvels novels are slated for publication in 2011.

== Bibliography ==
Novels

- Pulp Heroes – More Than Mortal (Knightraven Studios, 2008), ISBN 978-0-9815312-0-5
- Pulp Heroes – Khan Dynasty (Knightraven Studios, 2010), ISBN 978-0-9815312-1-2
- Pulp Heroes – Sanctuary Falls (Knightraven Studios, 2017), ISBN 978-0-9815312-5-0
- Modern Marvels – Viktoriana (Knightraven Studios, 2011), ISBN 978-0-9815312-4-3
- Modern Marvels – Gothika (forthcoming, 2018)

Short stories

- Pro Se Presents #3 (Pro Se Publications, 2011), ISBN 978-1-4664-0548-6
- The Hunter Island Adventure (Knightraven Studios, 2013), ISBN 978-1-4928-2364-3
- The Inner World Adventure (Knightraven Studios, 2013), ISBN 978-1-4928-1481-8
- The Cast Away (Knightraven Studios, 2014), ISBN 978-1-4975-9147-9
- The Pulp Heroes Anthology Series – Book 1 (Knightraven Studios, 2010), ISBN 978-0-9815312-7-4

Poem

- The Scarlet Dragon's Tale (Knightraven Books, 2007)

Others

- The Art of WAR – Volume 1 (Knightraven Studios, 2011), ISBN 978-0-9815312-6-7
- The Art of WAR – Volume 2 (forthcoming, 2011)
- 250 Funniest Office Jokes, Memos & Cartoon Pinups Volume 1 (K&R Books 1993), ISBN 978-0-9638942-0-5
- 250 Funniest Office Jokes, Memos & Cartoon Pinups Volume 2 (K&R Books 1995), ISBN 978-0-9638942-1-2
