= Le Mans–Angers railway =

- Map of the line

Overview
- Status: Operational
- Owner: RFF
- Locale: France (Pays de la Loire)
- Termini: Le Mans; Angers

Service
- System: SNCF
- Operator(s): SNCF

History
- Opened: 1863

Technical
- Line length: 132 km (82 mi)
- Number of tracks: Double track
- Track gauge: 1,435 mm (4 ft 8 1/2 in) standard gauge
- Electrification: 25 kV 50 Hz

The railway from Le Mans to Angers is an important French 132-kilometre long railway line. It is used for passenger (express, regional and suburban) and freight traffic. The railway was opened in 2 stages in 1863.

== Traffic ==
- TGV
- TER Pays de la Loire
- freight

=== Main stations ===
- Le Mans station
- Sablé-sur-Sarthe station
- Angers-Saint-Laud station

== Line history ==
The section between Le Mans and Sablé (48 km) was opened in March 1863

- Sablé - Angers (84 km): December 1863
