= French ship Jules Verne =

Two ships of the French Navy have borne the name Jules Verne in honour of science-fiction writer Jules Verne:

- Jules Verne (A640), a submarine tender launched in 1931 and scrapped in 1961.
- Jules Verne (A620), a repair ship launched in 1970 as Achéron; scrapped in 2016.
