= Tours–Saint-Nazaire railway =

- Map of the line until Le Croisic

Overview
- Status: Operational
- Owner: RFF
- Locale: France (Centre-Val de Loire, Pays de la Loire)
- Termini: Tours; Saint-Nazaire

Service
- System: SNCF
- Operator(s): SNCF

History
- Opened: 1848 - 1857

Technical
- Line length: 282.4 km (175.5 mi)
- Number of tracks: Double track
- Track gauge: 1,435 mm (4 ft 8 1/2 in) standard gauge
- Electrification: 25 kV 50 Hz
- Operating speed: 220 km/h (140 mph)

The railway from Tours to Saint-Nazaire is an important French 282-kilometre long railway line, following the lower course of the river Loire. It is used for passenger (express, regional and suburban) and freight traffic. The railway was opened in several stages between 1848 and 1857.

== Main stations ==
- Tours station
- Saumur station
- Angers-Saint-Laud station
- Nantes station
- Saint-Nazaire station

== Line history ==
Construction of the railway was started by the Chemin de Fer de Tours à Nantes, that became part of the Chemin de Fer de Paris à Orléans in 1852. The section between Tours and Saumur was opened in 1848. Saumur was linked to Angers in 1849, and the section between Angers and Nantes was opened in 1851. Finally, the section between Nantes and Saint-Nazaire was opened in 1857.
