= Marc Angenot =

Belgian-Canadian sociologist (born 1941)

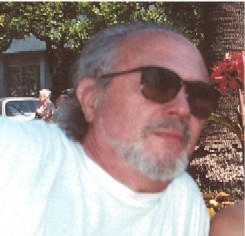
Marc Angenot

Marc Angenot (born Brussels, 1941) is a Belgian-Canadian social theorist, historian of ideas and literary critic. He is a professor of French literature at McGill University, Montreal, and holder of the James McGill Chair of Social Discourse Theory there. He is a leading exponent of the sociocritical approach to literature.

== Education ==
He studied at the Free University of Brussels (now split into the Université libre de Bruxelles and the Vrije Universiteit Brussel) from 1959 to 1967. His dissertation on the rhetoric of surrealism placed him in the line of Chaïm Perelman, and the Groupe Mu of the University of Liège.

== Social discourse and sociocritique ==
Along with Claude Duchet, Pierre V. Zima, Jacques Leenhardt, André Belleau, Jacques Dubois and Régine Robin, Angenot made use of the sociological approach to texts. His influences were Pierre Bourdieu, the Frankfurt School, and Mikhail Bakhtin. He favoured the discourse concept over the structuralist position on "text", of Gérard Genette and Tzvetan Todorov. His proposal to study the whole array of "social discourse" in a given state of society (1889: Un état du discours social, 1989) was a vast interdisciplinary project concerning the interdiscursive construction of society.

== Discursive history ==
In parallel, Angenot developed "discursive history". Here he examined the grand narratives, but as a modernist, rather than postmodernist. He has been concerned with the nineteenth century, and representative thinkers around revolution and social struggles: Auguste Comte, Saint-Simon, Charles Fourier, Étienne Cabet, Pierre Leroux, Proudhon, the Belgian Hippolyte Colins, Jules Guesde, Georges Sorel, and others. His conclusions are on the complexities and breaks within this tradition of discourse.

== Rhetoric ==
Angenot also published a number of books in rhetoric and argumentation, among which La Parole pamphlétaire in 1982, Rhétorique de l'anti-socialisme in 2004, and a treatise of "antilogical" rhetoric, Dialogues de sourds: Traité de rhétorique antilogique in 2008.

== Publications ==
- Le Roman populaire. Recherches en paralittérature, Montréal: Presses de l’Université du Québec, 1975.
- Les Champions des Femmes. Examen du discours sur la supériorité des femmes, 1400–1800. Montréal : Presses de l'Université du Québec, 1977.
- La Parole pamphlétaire. Contribution à la typologie des discours modernes. Paris, Payot, 1982, 416 p. (Prix Biguet 1983 de l'Académie française).
- Critique de la raison sémiotique. Fragment avec pin up. Montréal: Presses de l'Université de Montréal, 1985, 134 p. Translated as: Critique of Semiotic Reason. With an Introduction by Marie-Christine Leps. New York, Toronto & Ottawa: Legas, 1994. (Collection « Language, Media, and Education Studies », # 2).
- Ce que l'on dit des Juifs en 1889. Préface de Madeleine Rebérioux. Paris, Presses de l'Université de Vincennes, 1989. (Collection « Culture et Société »).
- Le Cru et le faisandé: sexe, discours social et littérature à la Belle Époque. Bruxelles: Labor, 1986, 202 p. (Collection « Archives du futur »).
- Mille huit cent quatre-vingt-neuf: un état du discours social. Montréal: Éditions du Préambule, 1989, 1,176 p.
- Le Centenaire de la Révolution. Paris: La Documentation française, 1989. (Collection «Les Médias et l'Événement»)
- Topographie du socialisme français, 1889–1890. Montréal: 1991.
- L'Œuvre poétique du Savon du Congo. Paris: Éditions des Cendres, 1992.
- L'Utopie collectiviste. Le Grand récit socialiste sous la Deuxième Internationale. Paris: Presses Universitaires de France, 1993.
- La Propagande socialiste: six essais d'analyse du discours. Montréal: Éditions Balzac, 1996.
- "Un Juif trahira" : l'espionnage militaire dans la propagande antisémitique 1884–1894. Montréal: CIADEST, 1994. Rpt. Montreal, 2003.
- Les idéologies du ressentiment. Essai. Montréal: XYZ Éditeur, 1996. (Prix « Spirale » de l’Essai 1996).
- La Critique au service de la révolution. Leuven: Peeters & Paris: Vrin, 2000.
- La démocratie c'est le mal, Québec, Presses de l'Université Laval, 2003.
- Antimilitarisme, idéologie et utopie, Québec, Presses de l'Université Laval, 2003.
- Rhétorique de l'anti-socialisme, Québec, Presses de l'Université Laval, 2004.
- Le Marxisme dans les Grands récits, Paris-Québec, L'Harmattan-PUL, 2005.
- Dialogues de sourds: traité de rhétorique antilogique, Paris, Mille et une nuits/Fayard, 2008.
- Vivre dans l'histoire au 20e siècle, Montréal, Discours social, 2008.
- Gnose et millénarisme; deux concepts pour le vingtième siècle, Montréal, Discours social, 2008.
- En quoi sommes-nous encore pieux, Presses de l'Université Laval, 2009.
- L'immunité française envers le fascisme, Montréal: Discours social, 2009.
- El discurso social, Buenos Aires: Siglo XXI, 2010.
- L'histoire des idées, Liège: PUL, 2014.
- Fascisme, totalitarisme, religion séculière: trois concepts pour le 20e siècle. Montréal, Discours social, 2014–2015. 4 volumes.
- O discurso social e as retòricas da incompreensao. São Carlos : Edufscar, 2015.
- Robespierre et l'art du portrait. Montréal: Discours social, 2016.

== Awards and honours ==
- 1985 – Fellow of the Royal Society of Canada
- 1987 – Killam Fellowship (Canada Council)
- 1996 – Prix André-Laurendeau
- 1996 – Prix Spirale Eva-Le-Grand
- 2005 – Prix Léon-Gérin
