= École secondaire Jules-Verne =

Location
- 5445 Baillie Street; Vancouver, British Columbia, V5Z 3M6; Canada; 49.2366°N 123.1228°W

Information
- School type: Secondary School
- Founded: September 2009
- School board: School District 93 Conseil scolaire francophone
- Principal: Alain Arbour
- Grades: 7-12
- Enrolment: 536 (September 2024)
- Language: French
- Colours: Black and gold
- Mascot: Albatros
- Team name: Albatros de Jules-Verne
- Website: Official website

École secondaire Jules-Verne is a public francophone secondary school located in the South Cambie neighbourhood of Vancouver, British Columbia, Canada. Named after the French author, it is part of School District 93 (Conseil scolaire francophone). The school is one of the many schools in Vancouver that provide the IB Diploma Program.

Jules-Verne has two science labs, a music room with soundproof studios, a library, a large theatre that seats 200, a full-size gymnasium, an exercise room, a greenhouse, a home economics room and an art room that includes a pottery space. The high school had made a unique arrangement to rent out the nearby park, Oak Meadows, during school hours to act as their field for gym class and extracurricular sports.

== History ==
Originally, students and staff of the school used to attend Kitsilano Secondary School in a separate program, which was intended to have all of its subjects taught in French. Despite the program's effort to provide all of its courses in French, many of the courses offered to students in grades 11 and 12 were done so strictly in English. Unlike the teachers of the regular Kitsilano academic program, the Francophone teachers were not given their own classrooms; they had to borrow them and needed to move teaching materials from one class to another.

As a result, the staff and the parents of the students felt that it was necessary for Kitsilano's Francophone students to get an all-French education in a separate school. The construction of École Secondaire Jules-Verne began in spring 2007, and students were able to attend the school on September 8, 2008, of the following year. When the school first opened, there were about 190 secondary students. The former principle said that most of the classrooms were used by the adjacent elementary school, Rose-des-Vents. The construction of the school was not completed until the end of March 2009 and the school was officially open on April 4, 2009.

As the number of students grew past capacity, a number of makeshift solutions were taken. The enrolment at École Secondaire Jules-Verne grew from 161 in the 2008/2009 school year to 244 in the 2011/2012 school year. The High School was built for a capacity of 350 students. The woodworking classroom was converting into a regular classroom with all equipment being sold, eliminating the woodworking course all together. Additionally, the basement of the 7th Day Adventist Church across the street from the secondary school is being rented to provide additional classroom space.

In 2019, there was a measles outbreak at the high school. Between both the elementary school, Rose-des-Vents, connected to the high school and Jules-Verne, there were 33 students and staff that were ordered to stay home, as there were either unvaccinated or unable to provide documentation proving their vaccination status. Vancouver Coastal Health announced that there 8 confirmed cases of the measles, at both the elementary and the high school.

== Diplomas ==
Diplomas	Description
"Dogwood"	Grade 12 Regular Diploma from the BC Ministry of Education. This is also the diploma awarded by English and immersion schools in British Columbia.
"Cornouiller"	Grade 12 Diploma in French from the BC Ministry of Education. This diploma gives access to French-language post-secondary institutions and is only offered to graduates of CSF schools.
IB Diploma Programme	International Baccalaureate Diploma. This degree is recognized by the BC Ministry and also in 150 countries around the world. Certificates are also offered for one or more courses.

== Athletics ==
Teams are divided by age group: 7th grade team (grade 7), Bantam (grade 8), Junior (grades 9 & 10), and Senior (grades 11 & 12). École Secondaire Jules-Verne participates in the Greater Vancouver Independent Schools Athletics Association (GVISAA) for the majority of the sports except for track and field. For track and field, athletes compete with the Vancouver Secondary Schools Athletics Association (VSSAA).

Athletic teams offered:

- Badminton
- Basketball
- Cross Country
- Rugby
- Soccer
- Track and Field
- Ultimate Frisbee
- Volleyball
- Wrestling

== Accolades in sports ==
École Secondaire Jules-Verne has achieved success in various sports at the provincial level through BC School Sports.

=== Basketball ===
In the 2022-23 season, the bantam girls' won the GVISAA title.

The girls Senior Basketball team won the Zone A, Vancouver Sea to Sky tournament in 2024.

=== Soccer ===
The boys' junior and senior soccer teams at École secondaire Jules-Verne have established themselves as one of the most dominant programs in British Columbia's lower-tier boys' soccer divisions. They have repeatedly qualified for and competed at the BC School Sports provincial championships on multiple occasions, consistently performing at an elite level. The coaches, Mathieu Ricordi and Avi Yan, have been a staple the team's success. Ricordi started the program before abruptly leaving his position in 2023. His departure has not been explained. Avi Yan and Nicolas Prevost are the current coaches.

They first achieved success in the 2015–16 season, the junior boys' team won the Greater Vancouver Independent Schools Athletic Association (GVISAA) boys' soccer title, qualifying for the provincial championship.

In the 2017–18 season, the senior boys' team won the GVISAA title.

In the 2021–22 season, the senior boys' team won the GVISAA title.

In the 2022–23 season, the senior boys' team won the Vancouver Sea-to-Sky Zone Championship, followed by the GVISAA title, and captured the BC School Sports 1A Boys Soccer Provincial Championship. The Provincial title was historic: it marked the first time École Secondaire Jules-Verne won a BC Provincial Championship, and the first time any public Francophone high school in British Columbia achieved this milestone.

In the 2023–24 season, the junior boys' team won the GVISAA championship. The senior boys' team retained the GVISAA title and placed third at the 1A Boys Soccer Provincial Championship (bronze medal).

In the 2024–25 season, the junior boys' team defended their GVISAA title for the third consecutive year. The senior boys' team also retained the GVISAA title and won the BC School Sports 1A Boys Soccer Provincial Championship.

In the 2025–26 season, the senior boys' soccer team defended their provincial title and won the 'A' Boys Soccer Provincial Championship.

=== Volleyball ===
During the 2021-22 season, the bantam boys' volleyball team won the GVISAA title.

A number of teams has made it to Provincials such as the girls Senior volleyball team and some student athletes participating in Cross Country, Track and Field and Wrestling.

== Clubs and activities ==
Jules-Verne offers a wide variety of extra-curricular clubs such as:

- Comité Parrainage
- Debate
- Comité Empreintes
- Gala Committee
- Green club Committee
- Homework-help club
- Model United Nations (MUN) in French (yearly convention held by the School board)
- Partner Committee
- Prom Committee
- Running club
- Robotics club
- SOGI
- Student council
- Robotics Club
- Student newspaper, called " L'Actualithé "
- Yearbook Committee

Jules-Verne events include:

- First Nations celebrations
- Gala
- Halloween dance
- Pink shirt day
- School elections for student council
- Talent show

Jules-Verne encourages their students to participate in activities and events organized by The Conseil Jeunesse which helps to connect the French-speaking youth of British Columbia. These activities are all in French and include:

British Columbia Francophone Youth Parliament (BCFYP)

The French-speaking Youth Parliament of British Columbia is a parliamentary simulation aimed at 14-25 year olds from all over British Columbia. Young people are immersed in the reality of British Columbia political life for three days.

SAGA

The SAGA is a multi-day event that aims to strengthen the involvement of French-speaking youth within their community.

Crescendo

Crescendo is a performing arts experience for Conseil Scolaire Francophone students aged 14 to 18, featuring music, dance, singing, theater, and circus arts.

Francophone improvisation league (LIFC)

For 3 days, several improvisation teams from all around British Columbia unite sharping their theatre skills while practicing French.

MONU Vancouver

MONU Vancouver is an event where each year Francophone students unite from across the province to deepen their understanding of global diplomacy.

== Special programs ==
=== IB Diploma ===
École secondaire Jules-Verne offers the IB Diploma Programme in French. The IB courses offered are French, English, Spanish, history, geography, chemistry, biology, mathematics, visual arts, as well as the IB Diploma core: Theory of Knowledge (TDC), the Extended Essay and creativity, activity, service (CAS).

=== Indigenous studies ===
Members of the Provincial Native Parents Committee, students and staff members have signed the "Aboriginal Education Enhancement Agreement" with the Chair of the CSF Board of Governors, the Minister of Education of British Columbia, and representatives of indigenous communities.

Parents of children with Indigenous heritage (First nations, Métis, Inuit, and unrecognized Indigenous people) can identify themselves on the CSF school registration forms, where the Indigenous ancestor can be a parent, grandparent, great-grandparent, etc. Funding provided by the Department of Education for this program is used to enhance academic, language and cultural programs for identified children. Parents are encouraged to engage in the process of developing a curriculum for their children.

=== École Virtuelle ===
For the students not in IB, in grades 11–12, they are able to take online classes at École Virtuelle. These classes are not being offered in person, so the students take them online with other students in the CSF. The grade 11 classes include: Histoire et culture francophones 11, Sciences et citoyens 11, Aéronautique 11, Plein Air 11, and Mécanique de Vélo 11 The grade 12 classes include: Psychologie, Criminologie, Peuples autochtones de la Colombie-Britannique, Développement de médias numériques, Plein Air 12, and Production Vidéo.

=== Dual Accreditation Program with Educacentre College ===
There is a dual accreditation program offered with the Educacentre College, which offers French online college courses for grade 11 and 12 students. If the student wishes to continue the program after high school in order to obtain the license or diploma of EPE, the courses taken will then be credited. Dual accreditation is a great way to deepen your knowledge of a profession and validate a career choice. The courses run from September to May and consist of 2 sessions (autumn/winter). For each of the completed courses, it is possible to obtain 4 course credits equivalent to a Grade 12 elective course. It takes an average of 5–8 hours of study/work per week. L'école virtuelle will cover registration costs as well as course costs. The courses offered with this program include: early childhood education, special educational assistance, health care worker, event management, holistic nutrition and Social Work Intervention.

=== Summer School ===
These courses are for Grade 10, 11 or 12 CSF students who will be 18 years of age or younger before the start of classes. These courses allow: obtain credits for graduation (after a failure); increase the ballot mark for those who wish to do so; Complete the course to meet the requirements for a post-secondary program. Attendance: Students must log in daily, turn on their camera and participate in sessions. Schedule: 1/2 day (3h30minutes, with breaks of course) either 8:30 to 12:00 and/or 12:30 to 4:00. Schedules will be determined later based on registrations. Requirements: 80 to 120 hours of work over the summer. Access to a computer is required. CSF students will be able to keep their computer provided by the CSF during the summer period. Note that the device will be blocked if the student is removed from the class. There is no cost to taking summer classes, the Ministry of Education will fund all school-aged students who have a Personal Identification Number (PIN) issued by British Columbia and who, with their parents or legal guardians, are usual residents of British Columbia.

== Services ==
=== Hot lunches ===
The school offers hot lunches available for purchase online, prepared in-house by students in a cooking class, overseen and managed by a teacher-cook. Parents can pre-purchase lunches online through an online portal called SchoolCashOnline.

=== Technology ===
All students at Jules-Verne are given access to a personal laptop computer (13-inch MacBook Air) as an educational tool for the remainder of their time at Jules-Verne. Students from grades 7 to 9 are not permitted to take their computers home. In grades 10–12, the students are given the privilege to take their laptops home as a tool to complete their school work. In addition, Jules-Verne issues an e-mail address for all students and staff. It has a library with computers for research assignments and communication, and Smart Boards in a number of classrooms.

=== Transportation ===
As Jules-Verne is a destination school with students coming from Vancouver, Burnaby, New Westminster, North Vancouver and Richmond, Jules-Verne offers a school bus service (yellow bus) for grade 7 and grade 8 students living more than 1 km away from the school. Students in grades 8 to 12 living beyond a 3 km radius and in the school's attendance area receive a monthly public transit pass: the compass card.

== See also ==
- Conseil scolaire francophone de la Colombie-Britannique
- Jules Verne (author)
