= Glossary of narratology =

This glossary of narratology is a list of explanations or translations of contemporary and historical concepts of narratology. It defines all the concepts and definitions used in Narration.

== Glossary ==
=== A ===
actorial narrative type

anachrony
Anachrony is the temporal reordering of elements of the story and their eventual presentation. It is considered a serious discrepancy between how the story is ordered and how it is presented. It is defined by French literary theorist Gérard Genette as a "temporal reordering of elements of the plot on the discourse level in relation to their chronological order on the story level". Anachronies can be based in the past e.g. retrospection, analepsis and flashback or can be in the future e.g. anticipation, prolepsis, flashforward. Examples of novels that use the technique include The Voice in Cocteau's La Machine infernale. More extreme cases of this narration technique can be found in La vie imaginaire de l'éboueur Auguste G. by Armand Gatti.

anticipation
Defined by Prince as a prolepsis, a flash forward, an anachrony going forward into the future of the narrative with respect to the present. The chronological narrative flow of events is interrupted to make space for the anticipation. In Madame Bovary prolepsis is used between chapters to elicitate anticipation.

analepsis
In essence a flashback in the narrative, i.e. the insertion of a previous scene into the current story. Defined by Genette as an anachrony in the past that is told in the present, it is often used to introduce new characters or protagonists whose contextual existence must be told. Contemporary novels written in a modernist or a postmodernist style use this technique to reorder the chronological or teleological narrative structure. Examples of this technique include Emma in Gustave Flaubert's Madame Bovary. Flaubert lets the reader know that while Emma feels nostalgic about her farming life, it is revealed to the reader through flashback that she was an incompetent farmer and wished to escape her life through marriage.

auctorial narrative type
The class of heterodiegetic or homodiegetic narratives characterised by zero focalisation. Defines one of Lintvelt's 3 narrative types along with actorial narrative type and neutral narrative type. Books that use this technique included Moby Dick by Herman Melville, Bella, Tom Jones by Henry Fielding.

auktorialen erzählsituation

autodiegesis

See autodiegetic narrative

autodiegetic narrative

A first-person narrative, where the narrator is the protagonist or the hero. Defined by Genette in 1980, is a form of § homodiegetic narraration where the protagonist or hero tells their own story. An example of a novel that uses this technique is Jane's narration in Jane Eyre. Other novels that use this technique include Great Expectations, Kiss Me, Deadly by Mickey Spillane and The Stranger by Albert Camus.

autonomous monologue

=== C ===
camera

Defined as one of Susan Stanford Friedman eight types of point of view. Novels that use this technque e.g. Goodbye to Berlin by Christopher Isherwood.

camera eye

=== D ===
diegesis
Diegesis, the opposite of § mimesis, is a style of fiction storytelling in which a narrator offers an on-site, often interior, view of the scene to the reader, viewer, or listener by subjectively describing the actions and, in some cases, thoughts, of one or more characters. Defined by Genette as "Telling" (diegesis) as opposed to "Showing" (mimesis). Diegesis is firmly rooted in genre studies and was defined by Plato and Aristotle. In narratology, Plato defined two poetic modes. In the Republic Book III, he describes the narrator of the verses of Homer as speaking with his own voice (diegesis) while the characters speak (mimesis). Mimesis in Ancient Greek meaning imitation describes the poet delivering a speech as though he was some other character. Aristotle in his Poetics defines all literature as mimesis.

discourse

See narrative discourse

deictic

Image depicting temporal, spatial and personal deixis, including a deictic center

deictic centre

deixis

Deixis is the use of words or phrases to refer to a particular time (e.g. then), place (e.g. here), or person (e.g. you) relative to the context of the utterance. There are many others for example "Now","This","That", "Up" and "There". Deixis exists in all known natural languages and is closely related to anaphora in linguistics, with a sometimes unclear distinction between the two. According to Bühler 1934, Deixis defines a centre of reference know as an Origo that identifies the speakers location and point in time and the Origo may shift from speaker to the character.

dramatic monologue

duration

One of the phenomena that defines the temporal relationship between story time and discourse time and specifies how long events or scenes last. The other two phenomena in the group that was defined by Genette as a subcategory of tense,, are order, which specfies the order of events and frequency, which specifies how often an event occurs. As discourse time is impossible to measure effectively, many narratologists prefer using speed and tempo. Other related definitions by Genette and Eberhard Lämmert distinguishes between ellipsis where events are not related, summary where events are briefly summarised, simultaneous narration which is isochrony and pause, no events at the plot level but where the discourse continues in the consciousness of the narrator. Duration in use:
- The sentence "Five years passed", has a lengthy story time, five years, but a short discourse time (it only took a second to read).
- Ulysses which has a short story time but a very long discourse time.

=== E ===
editorial omniscience

One of eight points of view that is defined by Friedman 1955b. He defines it as intrusive narrator, external to the story, i.e. heterodiegetic. Novels that use this technique include "Tess of the d'Urbervilles" and War and Peace.

ellipsis

er-form

embodied self

emic openings

etic openings

epilogue

extradiagetic

external focalisation

external point of view

=== F ===
fable

fabula
Fabula is the set of events and situations within their chronological sequence in a narrative i.e. it refers to the chronological sequence of events within the world of a narrative. The term was originated by the Russian formalists, the folklorist Vladimir Propp and literary theorist Viktor Shklovsky as part of the Russian Formalism movement of the 1920's and 1930's. Combined with the complementary term: syuzhet also defined by the Russian formalists, meaning "the way a story is organised", the two terms define a distinction between the "what" and the "how", or more accurately "what is being told" versus the "manner in which it is told".

figure of speech

figural narrative situation

first-person narrative

focalisation
Focalisation is the perspective through which events in a narrative are perceived and presented to the reader. Genette used it to replace the vaguer notion of "point of view" by separating the question of who sees (the focaliser) from who speaks (the narrator). Genette distinguished three types: zero focalisation (an omniscient narrator whose knowledge exceeds that of any character), internal focalisation (the narrative is filtered through a character's consciousness), and external focalisation (the narrator reports only what is externally observable, knowing less than the characters). Examples of novels that use zero focalisation include Vanity Fair and Adam Bede by George Eliot. Examples of novels that use internal focalisation include The Ambassadors by Henry James, The Age of Reason by Thomas Paine, The Ring and the Book by Robert Browning and For Whom the Bell Tolls. Examples of external focalisation used in novels include The Killers by Ernest Hemingway.

focalizer

flashback

focus of narration

form

frame
A frame is an abstract term borrowed from the domain of cognitive science to represent a type of scenario. It defines the mental data that represents various aspects of reality that is needed to enable human perception of those aspects. Narratology can be considered a frame that enables the understanding of reality. For example, imagining a house (the frame). Further elements within this frame can include the door or the windows.

frame narrative
A frame narrative (also known as a "frame story", "frame tale", "framing device'","sandwich narrative", or "intercalation") is a literary technique that serves as a companion piece to a story within a story, where an introductory or main narrative sets the stage either for a more emphasised second narrative or for a set of shorter stories. The frame story leads readers from a first story into one or more other stories within it. The frame story may also be used to inform readers about aspects of the secondary narrative(s) that may otherwise be hard to understand. This should not be confused with narrative structure. Novels that use this technique included 1001 Nights and The Decameron by Giovanni Boccaccio.

free direct discourse
A technique in narratology where the characters spoken words or thoughts are delivered as they appear without any narratorial mediation, e.g. quotes, attribution or first-person framing. For example "It was unbearably hot, and she just stood there. I can't stand any of these people! She decided to leave". "I can't stand any of these people!" is an example of free direct discourse. It is almost akin to interior monologue.

free indirect discourse
Free indirect discourse is the literary technique of writing a character's first-person narrative utterances in the voice of the third-person narrator. It is a style using aspects of third-person narrative conjoined with the essence of first-person direct speech. A type of narrative that is defined by the free form of its syntax along with the presence of deictics, expressive terms, styles and emotional colouring specific to the original speaker. Free indirect discourse is "free" as it doesn't have a tag clause i.e. a verb to speak or perceive. For example "He said that" or "She wondered why". Instead with the tag missing, for example: "Had she observed him at all" or "Tomorrow was Christmas". This type of narratology also incorporates politeness markers e.g. "Sir", deictic markers, e.g. "now" as well as expressions that are not usually found in indirect discourse but often found in direct discourse. Free indirect discourse is heavily dependent on context such that it generally appears close to verbs of speech or next to direct or indirect discourse. Although it is particularly associated with third-person, it can be used in first and second-person narrative, e.g. "My dream was out", "My wild fancy was surpassed by sober reality". Although it is particularly associated with past tense, it can be used with other tenses, e.g. "She shrugs her shoulders and goes out. She is not going to fall for this two-bit punk". Although it exists alongside internal focalisation, it isn't present in every sentence associated with the characters perspective, e.g. "He saw John leaning against the wall" or "She thought about her past and felt deeply moved". Lastly, it also occurs in spoken language as well as written languages. The technique is also referred to as free indirect speech, free indirect style, or, in French, discours indirect libre. Well known novels that use free indirect discourse include Jane Austen's Pride and Prejudice, and Anna Karenina by Leo Tolstoy and for example, in the modern novel The Corrections by Jonathan Franzen.

free indirect perception

frequency

Specifies how often an event occurs and the number of times its recounted. Defined by Genette as one of two subcategories of tense,, the other subcategoty being order. Frequency has a number of sub-definitions within narratology. With examples:

- Singular narration An event can occur once and be narrated once (singular). 'Today I went to the shop'.
- Repetitive narration An event can occur once and be narrated many times. 'Today I went to the shop' + 'Today he went to the shop'.
- Iterative narration An event can occur many times and be narrated once. 'I used to go to the shop'.

Two examples of novels where the use of frequency of events is particularly important include Madame Bovary and Proust's In Search of Lost Time.

=== H ===
heterodiegetic narration
The narration is heterodiegetic if the narrator is not the protagonist and is outside the fictional universe. In the language of narratology, the narrator is not part of the § diegesis. Typically, but not always associated with the third-person narration. It can be used with you, they and one narratives. Examples of novels that use these techniques include the Iliad and Eugénie Grandet, and Pride and Prejudice.

homodiegetic narration
The narration is homodiegetic if the narrator is a character in the events or situations in the story. Defined by literary theorist Gérard Genette, the narrator is the same person in the § diegesis. It is equivalent to First-person narration. If that person is the main protagonist, then Genette calls this § autodiegesis. We narratives, where the story-teller is part of the group, but has their own narration are considered partially autodiegetic. This applies to couples narrating the story within the group. Examples of novels where the narrators are part of the story include Mr Lockwood in Wuthering Heights. Other examples include Gil Blas, All the King's Men and The Great Gatsby and Kiss Me, Deadly.

hypodiegetic narrative
A "hypodiegetic narrative" is a narrative embedded in another narrative. Examples of novels that use the hypodiegetic narrative technique include Joseph Conrad's "Heart of Darkness" and Mrs. Frisby and the Rats of NIMH by Robert C. O'Brien.

=== I ===
"I" as protagonist

"I" as witness

ich erzählsituation

ich-form

implied author

implied reader

interior monologue

A narrative technique that represents the consciousness, the mental processes — thoughts, impressions and perceptions of a subject in direct speech that is present in the minds of protagonists. It is presented as free direct thought, in the present tense and first person narrative. Example novels that use this technique include Les lauriers sont coupés by Édouard Dujardin and Ulysses. The narrative mode of stream of consciousness is now see as a variant of interior monologue where the technique represents only the characters thoughts, while stream of consciousness represents both impressions and thoughts. However, both terms are used interchangeably. Dujardin is considered the most famous example, written entirely in free direct discourse. The first use of the technique was by Leo Tolstoy and Arthur Schnitzler and then used by Dorothy Richardson in the Pilgrimage series, Mrs. Dalloway by Virginia Woolf and James Joyce. See autonomous monologue, dramatic monologue, types of discourse.

internal focalisation

A form of focalisation where the narrative is filtered through the characters own point of view or perspective, in essence through their own consciousness. Example novels that use this technique with a single point of view include The Ambassadors and What Maisie Knew by Henry James. When different points of view are presented: The Age of Reason, The Golden Bowl by Henry James. When the same situation is presented from multiple points of view: The Moonstone by Wilkie Collins or the The Ring and the Book by Robert Browning.

internal point of view

See internal focalisation

intradiegetic

Part of and within the diegesis. Essentially a character within the story who narrates a story within a story, that is a hypodiegetic narrative This is the intradiegetic level. Examples of novels that use this technique include Père Goriot by Balzac, Manon Lescaut by Antoine François Prévost and Heart of Darkness by Conrad. See narrative levels for an ontological description of different levels of narration.

isochrony
Isochrony assumes that any narrative utterances are divisible into equal rhythmic portions of some kind. Defined by Genette as the speed of the narrative. An isochronic narrative is one where the speed is constant. See duration.

=== M ===
mediacy

metafictional

metalepsis
Defined by Genette as a paradoxical transgression of the boundaries between narrative levels or logically distinct worlds. Defined by Herman as a confusion in narrative levels or when characters migrate between story levels. Two types are defined in narratology. The most common example of metalepsis in narrative occurs when a narrator intrudes upon another world being narrated, which is defined as ontological metalepsis. In the second type, known as discursive or rhetorical metalepsis, the narrator imagines himself to be present in the world of the characters or imagines the characters in his world, without impacting the plot. Example of bodies of work that use this technique are Flann O'Brien's novel At Swim-Two-Birds and the play Endgame by Samuel Beckett. In At Swim-Two-Birds, the characters in the novel jump a narrative level to attack the novelist who wrote them. In Endgame, Clov observes the audience with his telescope or breaks the fourth wall by telling the audience he is "exiting" the play.

metaphor

metonymy
A metonymy is a figure of speech in which a concept, A, is referred to by the name of another concept, B, which is associated with A. Some metonymies, specifically synecdoches, focus on a smaller concept to represent a larger concept that includes it: for example "a fleet of a hundred sail", "we need boots on the ground". A further example is the well known expression, "The pen is mightier than the sword"; this contains two metonymies, the pen and the sword. Metonymy is closely related to metaphor. synecdoche and metalepsis are considered specific types of metonymy.

metanarrative

mimesis

mise-en-abyme

mode

mood

Mood is the emotion or feeling the language evokes in the audience. It is created by means of setting in which the narrative takes place, the attitude of the narrator or characters, and descriptions. Mood is one of the three fundamental terms that Genette defines within narratology, the others being tense and voice that provide the level of definition in the narrative. Genette defines mood in two further categories — distance which is the relation of the narration to what it narrates and perspective which defines the limit or the extent to which the narrator allows us to penetrate into the character or the event. Defined by Prince as the set of modalities distance, mode and perspective or point of view that regulates the delivery of narrative information.

motif

multiple internal point of view

multiple selective omniscience

=== N ===
narrator

narrated

narratee

narrating

narrative

narrative discourse
Defines a visual shorthand that is interpreted and used to construct and evoke a story world. Defined by Prince as one of two planes of semiotics, the expression plane that corresponds to narrative, to the content plane, that corresponds to the story. In essence, it is the how of the narration, to what is the story. Defined by Genette, discourse has a substance, a form, an order, a point of view and a speed. It is also defined by linguist Émile Benveniste as the discourse level (discours - speech) that has its counterpart in the story (histoire - story). In this definition, Discours has an enuciation that forms a sender and receiver relationship. More generally, it is the product of both the result of the process of narration with both the focalisation and chronological aspects of the story and the plot. Concrete examples: In a film or a play, the narrative discourse is made up of the sound and images that are produced.

narrative levels

narrative report

narrative speeds

narrativity

narratology

neutral narrative type

neutral omniscience

=== O ===
omniscient author

order

omniscient narrator

omniscient point of view

=== P ===
personale erzählsituation
The personale Erzählsituation is telling a story from inside one character's perspective (the Reflektorfigur), in the third person, showing only what that character sees or thinks. It is often used for portraying inner, psychological states, and it makes impression as if no narrator is present. Its main limitation is being locked into one viewpoint, which authors ease by switching between characters or briefly stepping back to an authorial stance.

pause
This is the slowest speed of narrative delivery. The discourse continues in the consciousness of the narrator but the flow of events stop.Formally defined as type of duration. and is defined as one of the narrative speeds. It's related to the tempo of the narrative along with ellipsis, scene, summary and stretch

perspective

panorama

point of view
A synonym for perspective that was defined by Percy Lubbock as a term primarily used in English-speaking countries. In the modern era, it is most often seen as another aspect of focalisation.
Genette defines those who see as a form of focalisation and those who speak as narration. Prince defines point of view as a form of focalisation, perspective, viewpoint. An omniscient narrator is unlocated and not subject to or restricted to a particular concept. Example novels include Vanity Fair or Adam Bede. An internal point of view is where the characters' knowledge, perceptions and feelings define the narrative. This may be limited to one character ("fixed"), such as in What Maisie Knew, or several characters ("variable") who define the narrative in a sequence of events, such as in The Golden Bowl or The Age of Reason. Alternatively, the same events may be repeated in a narrative from different perspectives ("multiple"), such as in The Moonstone or the The Ring and the Book. Lastly, in an external point of view, it may be a focal point in the diegesis where instead of feeling, knowledge and perceptions, the narrative is defined only by the characters words and actions within a particular setting. An example short story is Hills Like White Elephants. Genette defined it as "one who sees" (this is the point of view) as opposed to "one who speaks". Lubbock 1965 defines point of view as involving both concepts and perception but also the narrators overtness, the type of rendering, i.e. drama or panorama and the different types of discourse. In the general case, point of view is defined by Susan Sniader Lanser as the relationship between the narrator and narrating and narrator and narrated and between the narrator and narratee.

Cleanth Brooks and Robert Penn Warren define the term focus of narration that has four distinctions to a particular point of view. These are:
- An autodiegetic narrative i.e. first-person. First-person observer, the narrator in first-person tells a story they have observed. "The Great Gatsby" uses this technique.
- author-observer - The author speaking in a purely objective sense as observer, without examing character or commenting. "Hills Like White Elephants"
- omniscient author - The author is able to determine what happens in the story, what the character are thinking and provides their own comments. An example of a novel that uses this distinction is Tess of the d'Urbervilles.

Joseph Evans Grimes also defined four distinctions:
- Omniscient viewpoint which is similar to Brooks and Warrens omniscient author.
- homodiegetic narration with an internal point of view
- heterodiegetic narration with an internal point of view
- third-person objective viewpoint. In essence an external point of view.

Jean Pouillon (1993) defines the term vision (which is similar to Todorov's 1981 term aspect) as having three classifications:
- "vision from behind", which is similar to zero focalisation. Novels that use it include "Tess of the d'Urbervilles".
- "vision with". Novels that use it include "The Ambassadors" and "The Age of Reason".
- "vision from without", which is similar to external point of view.

Norman Friedman 1955b defines point of view with eight classifications in a hierarchy of importance:
- editorial omniscience: An intrusive narrator, external to the story, i.e. heterodiegetic. Novels that use this include "Tess of the d'Urbervilles" and War and Peace.
- neutral omniscience: A narrator, external to the story, i.e. heterodiegetic, essentially third-person narration. Example novels include Point Counter Point, Lord of the Flies and The Maltese Falcon.
- "I" as witness: First-person narration of a secondary character where their point of view is limited but only as an eye witness. Example novels include The Good Soldier, "The Great Gatsby".
- "I" as protagonist: Where the protagonist narrates the entire story, through their perspective. Example novels include The Catcher in the Rye, Great Expectations and Adventures of Huckleberry Finn.
- multiple selective omniscience: A heterodiegetic narrator with different internal points of views. Generally a third-person narrative, the narrator may be a character, who is not external to the story but is difficult to determine whether the thoughts come from the narrator or a specific character(s). Translates and analyses the characters thoughts. scene is particularly important in this classification. Example novels include "The Age of Reason", To the Lighthouse.
- selective omniscience: A heterodiegetic narrator with a fixed internal point of view. Essentially stream of consciousness, i.e. a direct representation of the characters thoughts. Example novels that use it are "The Ambassadors" and A Portrait of the Artist as a Young Man.
- dramatic mode: A heterodiegetic narrator with an external point of view. As the narrator and author are absent, only the characters words and actions define the textual narrative. Essentially made up of the characters dialogue. An example novel that uses this technique is The Awkward Age.
- camera: Where the flow of events naturally occur and are recorded and transmitted, i.e. as snapshots of reality, so has an associated selection. Example novels include Goodbye to Berlin.

Franz Karl Stanzel defines three types of point of view
- auktorialen erzählsituation (authorial narrative situation): Defined as omniscient narrator Example novels include "Tess of the d'Urbervilles" and "Tom Jones"
- personale erzählsituation (personal narrative situation): Defined as a heterodiegetic narration with an internal point of view. Example novels are "The Ambassadors".
- ich erzählsituation (I narrative situation) Defined as first-person narrative Example novels include "Great Expectations" and "Nausea".

Bertil Romberg 1962 used the three points of view defined by Stanzel and adds the following:
- narrator as behaviourist observer. See camera eye. Books that use this technique include "Hills Like White Elephants".

Boris Uspenskij 1973 states that point of view has four classifications:
- ideological:
- phraseological:
- spatiotemporal: Defined as the spatial perspective and temporal distance from the narration
- psychological. He defines psychological as the distance or closeness, i.e. affinity with the narration and an distinction between internal and external point of view.

Lubomír Doležel 1973 classifies 6 terms for point of view between first-person narrative and third-person narrative and defines a further three narrative modes:
- objective: The narrator is on the edge of the narration i.e. as the opposed to the centre, a distinction between the ich-form and er-form and does not comment on the narration.
- rhetorical: This is the same as objective but the narrator comments on the situation and events in the story.
- subjective: The narrator is located in the centre of the story and the narrator can fully take part in that story.

Jaap Lintvelt 1981 defined 5 terms to classify point of view:
- heterodiegetic auctorial narrative type: Defined as the point of view in a heterodiegetic narration. The narrator defines the point of view, not the characters. Novels that use this technique include "Tess of the d'Urbervilles" and "Tom Jones".
- heterodiegetic actorial narrative type: heterodiegetic narration where the character defines the point of view, not the narrator. "The Ambassadors"
- heterodiegetic neutral narrative type: Similar to Friedman's dramatic mode. Neither the narrator nor the story characters define the point of view. "The Killers" and Moderato Cantabile by Marguerite Duras
- homodiegetic auctorial narrative type: The narrator defines point of view in homodiegetic narration. "Moby Dick"
- homodiegetic actorial narrative type: Defined as homodiegetic narration , where the character who is the narrator defines the point of view. "The Hunger"

plot

prolepsis
A prolepsis is an anachrony going forward into the future of the narrative with respect to the present, i.e. it is the instantiation of one or more events in the narrative that will occur after the present as though they already exist. Defined by Genette as an account of events that haven't taken place, prolepsis leads to a disruption in the temporal flow of the narrative. Colloquially defined as Flashforward, it is a scene that temporarily takes the narrative forward in time from the current point of the story in literature. An example of a poem that uses this technique is John Keats’s poem Isabella, or the Pot of Basil (1818). Examples of novels that use this technique include Charles Dickens' 1843 novella A Christmas Carol and Muriel Spark's The Prime of Miss Jean Brodie.

=== R ===
representation of consciousness

retrospection

=== S ===
selective omniscience

sender

scene

speed

story

Colloquially, a story is presented through a sequence of written or spoken words, through still or moving images, encapsulated within a historical context and can include events in the past. It is a synonym for the narrative. It has a number of meanings depending on setting. Formally and commonly in the first definition, it is the content plane of the narrative as opposed to the expression plane or the discourse, the "what" of the story as opposed to "how", the narrative to the narrating.

Genette defined the story level as diegetic and the narration level as extradiagetic.

stream of consciousness

Stream of consciousness is a narrative mode or method that attempts "to depict the multitudinous thoughts and feelings which pass through the mind" of a narrator. It is usually in the form of an interior monologue which is disjointed or has irregular punctuation. Fludernick defines it as the formalisation of mental processes as the written word that represents consciousness using § psychonarration, § free indirect thought and interior monologue. Example novels that use this technique include Mrs Dalloway and Ulysses.

stretch

story time

substance

summary

synecdoche
Synecdoche is a type of metonymy; it is a figure of speech that uses a term for a part of something to refer to the whole (pars pro toto), or vice versa (totum pro parte). The term comes from Greek Syn, meaning "with" or "along with" (as in synonym) and ekdoche, meaning sense or interpretation; thus literally, "interpret along with". Common English synecdoches include suits for businessmen, wheels for automobile, and boots for soldiers.

syuzhet

=== T ===
tag clause

tempo

Defined as the rate of narrative speed. It is the narrative pace and engagement of the telling of a story, through which the rate in which the story progresses in relation to how the audience perceives time and events in that story. There are 5 classifications of tempo, which are ellipsis, summary, scene, stretch and pause.

tense

Defines by Prince as a set of temporal relations between the story and the discourse — narrating and narrated. It relates the time of an event to another time. Defined by Genette as one of the main terms along with voice and mood that provide the level of definition in the narrative and connects both story and narrative. Tense is further subdivided into duration, frequency and order. According to Bühler 1934, Benveniste 1971 and Weinrich 1964, tenses can be grouped into two main categories. These are 1) Tenses that related to the deictic centre of "I, Here, Now" to the act of speaking. For example in Present perfect, "he has eaten" that express a past event that has present consequences. 2) In the second category, tenses are not related to the deictic centre. For example, using a form of preterite, a common example, "He ate" where it is a past event that is not connected to the present.

third-person narrative

See heterodiegetic narration.

types of discourse

=== V ===
viewpoint

Defined by Prince as focalisation and point of view. Grimes defines four types: Omniscient Viewpoint which is zero focalisation. The second definition is: first person participant viewpoint which is homodiegetic narration with internal focalisation. Third definition is: third-person subjective viewpoint which can defined as heterodiegetic narration with internal focalisation. The fourth definition is: third-person objective viewpoint. This is the same as external focalisation.

voice

Voice is concerned with who narrates and from where they narrate. Voice is one of the three fundamental terms that Genette defines within narratology, the others being tense and mood that provide the level of definition in the narrative. Genette states it connects narrating with narrative to narrating and story. In essence, Genette defines it as "Who speaks". Prince defines it as the set of signs that associates and govern the relationship between the narrator to the temporal and spatial contextual definition of events and situations that occur in the telling of the story. Often confused with point of view which is defined as "Who sees" as opposed to "Who speaks".

=== Z ===
zero focalisation

Defined by Genette in 1980 as a narrator who knows more than any character and can move freely between characters' minds. This corresponds to the traditional omniscient narrator or "authorial narrator". Novels that use this technique include Vanity Fair by William Makepeace Thackeray and Eugénie Grandet by Balzac.
