= Hypodiegetic narrative =

In narratology, a hypodiegetic narrative is a narrative embedded in another narrative. The account of the monster in the novel Frankenstein is an example. The term was coined by Mieke Bal in 1977 and narratologists often prefer it over the name metadiegetic narrative that was coined by Gérard Genette in 1980.

Another name sometimes used is pseudo-diegetic narrative, although this more strictly is when the hypodiegetic status is forgotten and the narrative begins to function as a simply diegetic one.

In Mrs. Frisby and the Rats of NIMH the life story of Nicodemus that he tells Mrs Frisby is such a narrative.

When narrative levels are confused or entangled, this is metalepsis.

Bal explained the terminological difference thus:

I continue to be unhappy with Genette's hierarchical inversion. I think that to indicate dependence, we have to replace higher with its opposite. To save the prefix "meta-" (Note: See "meta-") for a more appropriate use, I want to proppose, provisionally and for lack of anything better, that we speak of "hypo-" (Note: See "hypo-"): "hypo-narrative", "hypo-diegetic".

She noted that Robert Scholes in 1971 had used "metanarrative" to mean an exterior story wrapped around an interior story, and this required a name for the opposite framing.

== See also ==
- story within a story
- diegesis
