= Paratext =

Term in literary criticism

In literary interpretation, paratext is material that surrounds a published main text (e.g., the story, non-fiction description, poems, etc.) supplied by the authors, editors, printers, and publishers. These added elements form a frame for the main text, and can change the reception of a text or its interpretation by the public. In Gérard Genette's terminology, paratext is a subtype of transtextuality (See the overview on the French Wikipedia page paratexte).

Paratext is most often associated with books, as they typically include a cover (with associated cover art), title, front matter (dedication, opening information, foreword, epigraph), Back matter (endpapers, indexes, and colophons), and many other materials not crafted by the author. Other editorial decisions can also fall into the category of paratext, such as the formatting or typography. Paratext functions to inform and guide the reader, to promote the (meta)text, and to shape appearance.

Authors do not always receive the final say about paratextual materials. The 2009 young adult novel Liar, for example, was initially published with an image of a white girl on the cover, although the text identifies the narrator of the story as black.

The paratexts of limited editions copies can offer additional insight to what makes a copy unique. For example, the 1995 version of The Revelation of Saint John the Divine: The Kings James Version illustrated by Allan Rohan Crite contains a limited editions club sheet, hand engravings, an afterword, and a note on the edition. The limited editions club sheet comes before the first chapter, and offers information on the context of The Revelation of Saint John the Divine, along with why Crite decided to add illustrations. The afterword, written by the illustrator, offers his perspective on this edition and it's importance. Overall, paratexts serve as a crucial contextual element to text, especially limited edition copies.

The concept of paratext is closely related to the concept of hypotext, which is the earlier text that serves as a source for the current text."Genette's term was hypertextuality".

== Theory ==
Literary theorist Gérard Genette defines paratext as those things in a published work that accompany the text, things such as the author's name, the title, preface or introduction, or illustrations. He states, "More than a boundary or a sealed border, the paratext is, rather, a threshold." It is "a zone between text and off-text, a zone not only of transition but also of transaction: a privileged place of pragmatics and a strategy, of an influence on the public, an influence that ... is at the service of a better reception for the text and a more pertinent reading of it". Then quoting Philippe Lejeune, Genette further describes paratext as "a fringe of the printed text which in reality controls one's whole reading of the text". This threshold consists of a peritext, consisting of elements such as titles, chapter titles, prefaces and notes. It also includes an epitext, which consists of elements such as interviews, publicity announcements, reviews by and addresses to critics, private letters and other authorial and editorial discussions – 'outside' of the text in question. The paratext is the sum of the peritext and epitext.

Book scholar Nicholas Basbanes extends the concept of paratext to include illustrations, dust jackets, indexes, appendices, the thickness and weight of paper, typefaces, and binding. University of Tübingen philology department offers a short bibliography on paratexts related to ancient literature.

== See also ==
- Diegesis
- Literary theory
- Mimesis
- Palimpsest
- Semiotics

== Bibliography ==
- Basbanes, Nicholas. A Splendor of Letters: The Permanence of Books in an Impermanent World. New York: HarperCollins, 2003.
- Bayer, Gerd (2016). Novel Horizons: The Genre Making of Restoration Fiction. Manchester: Manchester University Press. ISBN 978-1-78-499123-4.
- Collins, Ronald K. L.; Skover, David M. (February 1992). "Paratexts". Stanford Law Review. 44 (3): 509–552. doi:10.2307/1228974. JSTOR 1228974.
- Huber, Alexander: Paratexte in der englischen Erzählprosa des 18. Jahrhunderts [Paratexts in eighteenth-century English prose fiction]. (Master's thesis [in German]). Munich: Ludwig-Maximilians-Universität München, 1997. [discusses Henry Fielding's Tom Jones, Jonathan Swift's A Tale of a Tub, and Laurence Sterne's Tristram Shandy]
- Müllerová, Lenka (2009). Reklamní aspekty sekundárních knižních textů v devadesátých letech 20. století [Advertising aspects of secondary book texts in the 1990s] (Doctoral thesis) (in Czech). Brno, Czech Republic: Masaryk University.
- Pellatt, Valerie (ed.). Text, Extratext, Metatext and Paratext in Translation. Newcastle upon Tyne: Cambridge Scholars Publishing, 2013.
- Stanitzek, Georg (September 2005). "Texts and paratexts in media". Critical Inquiry. 32 (1). Translated by Klein, Ellen: 27–42. doi:10.1086/498002. JSTOR 10.1086/498002. doi:10.2307/3651473.
- Skare, Roswitha. “The Paratext of Digital Documents.” Journal of Documentation 77, no. 2 (2021): 449–60.
- Żmuda, Michał (2017). "Parateksty gier cyfrowych – odbiór gry a paratekstualne funkcje i procesy" [Paratexts of Video Games: Game Reception and Paratextual Functions and Processes] (PDF). Teksty Drugie (in Czech). 3: 363–380. doi:10.18318/td.2017.3.22.
