= Palimpsest (disambiguation) =

A palimpsest is a manuscript page that has been scraped off and used again.

Palimpsest may also refer to:

== Books and journals ==
- Palimpsest (novel), by Catherynne M. Valente, 2009
- Palimpsest (novella), by Charles Stross, 2009
- Palimpsest, a memoir by Gore Vidal, 1995
- Palimpsest: Documents From a Korean Adoption, a graphic novel and memoir by Lisa Wool-Rim Sjöblom, 2019
- Palimpsests: Literature in the Second Degree, a book by Gérard Genette, 1982
- Palimpsest (journal), an academic journal about women of the African diaspora
- The Palimpsest, now Iowa Heritage Illustrated, a journal of the State Historical Society of Iowa
- Palimpsest Press, a Canadian book publishing company

== Music ==
- Palimpsest (album), a 2020 album by Protest the Hero
- Palimpsest (Xenakis), a chamber music composition by Iannis Xenakis, 1979
- Palimpsest I and Palimpsest II, orchestral compositions by George Benjamin

== Science and technology ==
- Palimpsest (geology), a geographical feature
- Palimpsest (planetary astronomy), a type of crater on a terrestrial planet or moon of the Solar System
- Palimpsest (software) or GNOME Disks, a Linux disk utility

== Other uses ==
- Palimpsest (podcast), a horror podcast

== See also ==
- Palimpsestis or Tethea, a genus of moths
