= Diegesis =

Style of fiction storytelling involving narration

Diegesis (/ˌdaɪəˈdʒiːsɪs/; from Ancient Greek διήγησις (diḗgēsis) 'narration, narrative', from διηγεῖσθαι (diēgeîsthai) 'to narrate') is a style of fiction storytelling in which a participating narrator offers an on-site, often interior, view of the scene to the reader, viewer, or listener by subjectively describing the actions and, in some cases, thoughts, of one or more characters. Diegetic events are those experienced by both the characters within a piece and the audience, while non-diegetic elements of a story make up the "fourth wall" separating the characters from the audience. Diegesis in music describes a character's ability to hear the music presented for the audience, in the context of musical theatre or film scoring.

== Origin ==
Diegesis (Greek διήγησις "narration") and mimesis (Greek μίμησις "imitation") have been contrasted since Aristotle. For Aristotle, mimesis shows rather than tells, by means of action that is enacted. Diegesis is the telling of a story by a narrator. The narrator may speak as a particular character, or may be the invisible narrator, or even the all-knowing narrator who speaks from "outside" in the form of commenting on the action or the characters.

== In different fields ==
=== Literature ===
For narratologists, all parts of narratives—characters, narrators, existents, actors—are characterized in terms of diegesis. In literature, discussions of diegesis tend to concern discourse/sjužet (in Russian Formalism) (vs. story/fabula). In diegesis, the narrator tells the story.

- Details about the world itself and the experiences of its characters are revealed explicitly through narrative.
- The story is told or recounted, as opposed to shown or enacted.
- There is a presumed detachment from the story of both the speaker and the audience.

Diegesis is multi-levelled in narrative fiction. Gérard Genette distinguishes between three "diegetic levels":

- The extradiegetic level (the level of the narrative's telling) is, according to Prince, "external to (not part of) any diegesis". One might think of this as what we commonly understand to be the narrator's level, the level at which exists a narrator who is not part of the story being told. (Contrast heterodiegetic narration.)
- The diegetic level or intradiegetic level is understood as the level of the characters, their thoughts and actions. John Watson of the Sherlock Holmes stories is a diegetic narrator because he is narrating from within the story. (Compare homodiegetic narration.)
- The metadiegetic level or hypodiegetic level is that part of a diegesis that is embedded in another one and is often understood as a story within a story, as when diegetic narrators themselves tell a story.

In dramatic texts, the poet never speaks directly; in narrative texts, poets speak as themselves.

=== Film ===
In filmmaking the term is used to refer to the story as it is directly depicted onscreen, as opposed to the (typically much longer) real time events which said story purports to tell. (It is the difference between seeing an intertitle reading "a week later," and simply waiting a week.) Diegesis may concern elements, such as characters, events, and things within the main or primary narrative. However, the author may include elements that are not intended for the primary narrative, such as stories within stories. Characters and events may be referred to elsewhere or in historical contexts and are therefore outside the main story; thus, they are presented in an extradiegetic situation.

The classical distinction between the diegetic mode and the mimetic mode relates to the difference between the epos (or epic poetry) and drama. The "epos" relates stories by telling them through narration, while drama enacts stories through direct embodiment (showing). In terms of classical poetics, the cinema is an epic form that utilizes dramatic elements; this is determined by the technologies of the camera and editing. Even in a spatially and temporally continuous scene (mimicking the theatrical situation, as it were), the camera chooses for us where to look — and where not to look. In a similar way, editing causes us to jump from one place (and/or time) to another, whether it be elsewhere in the room, or across town. This jump is a form of narration; it is as if a narrator whispers to us: "meanwhile, on the other side of the forest". It is for this reason that the "story-world" in cinema is referred to as "diegetic"; elements that belong to the film's narrative world are diegetic elements. This is why, in the cinema, we may refer to the film's diegetic world.

"Diegetic", in the cinema, typically refers to the internal world created by the story that the characters themselves experience and encounter: the narrative "space" that includes all the parts of the story, both those that are and those that are not actually shown on the screen, such as events that have led up to the present action; people who are being talked about; or events that are presumed to have happened elsewhere or at a different time; such as the intro to "Star Wars", with its now classic "A long time ago, in a galaxy far, far away..."

Thus, elements of a film can be "diegetic" or "non-diegetic". These terms are most commonly used in reference to sound in a film. Most soundtrack music in films is non-diegetic; heard by the audience, but not by the characters. Some films reverse this convention; for example, Baby Driver employs diegetic music, played by the characters on music devices, to which many of the film's action scenes are set. These terms can also apply to other elements. For example, an insert shot that depicts something that is neither taking place in the world of the film, nor is seen, imagined, or thought by a character, is a non-diegetic insert. Titles, subtitles, and voice-over narration (with some exceptions) are also non-diegetic.

=== Video games ===
In the game Dead Space, the colored spine of the player's spacesuit is used to indicate the health points of their character. This is rendered within the environment of the game, as part of the player's character. Ammo, mission updates, and several key menus are also rendered in the game world, which are viewed by the player's character.

In video games "diegesis" comprises the narrative game world, its characters, objects and actions which can be classified as "intra-diegetic", by both being part of the narration and not breaking the fourth wall. Status icons, menu bars and other UI which are not part of the game world itself can be considered as "extra-diegetic"; a game character does not know about them even though for the player they may present crucial information. A noted example of a diegetic interface in video games is that of the Dead Space series, in which the player-character is equipped with an advanced survival suit that projects holographic images to the character within the game's rendering engine that also serve as the game's user-interface to the player to show weapon selection, inventory management, and special actions that can be taken.

== See also ==
- Diegetic music
- Mimesis
- Paratext
- Dramatic irony
- Hypodiegetic narrative

== Bibliography ==
- Aristotle. 1974. "Poetics". Trans. S.H. Butcher. In Dramatic Theory and Criticism: Greeks to Grotowski. Ed. Bernard F. Dukore. Florence, KY: Heinle & Heinle. ISBN 0-03-091152-4. p. 31–55.
- Bunia, Remigius. 2010. "Diegesis and Representation: Beyond the Fictional World, on the Margins of Story and Narrative," Poetics Today 31.4, 679–720. doi:10.1215/03335372-2010-010.
- Coyle, R. (2004). Pop goes the music track. Metro Magazine, 140, 94–95.
- Elam, Keir. 1980. The Semiotics of Theatre and Drama. New Accents Ser. London and New York: Methuen. ISBN 0-416-72060-9.
- Mäkelä, Tomi (2025). Sichtbare, denkbare und hörbare Töne: Inszeniertes Musikgeschehen im Tonfilm zwischen The Jazz Singer und Anora. Peter Lang: Berlin, Lausanne etc. ISBN 9783631935897.
- Pfister, Manfred. 1977. The Theory and Analysis of Drama. Trans. John Halliday. European Studies in English Literature Ser. Cambridige: Cambridge University Press, 1988. ISBN 0-521-42383-X.
- Plato. c. 373 BC. Republic. Retrieved from Project Gutenberg on 2 September 2007.
- Michael Ryan, Melissa Lenos, An Introduction to Film Analysis: Technique and Meaning in Narrative Film, The Continuum International Publishing Group, 2012. ISBN 9780826430021.
