= Focalisation =

Term in narrative theory

In narratology, focalisation (also focalization) is the perspective through which events in a narrative are perceived and presented to the reader. The concept was introduced by French narrative theorist Gérard Genette to replace the vaguer notion of "point of view" by separating the question of who sees (the focaliser) from who speaks (the narrator). Genette distinguished three types: zero focalisation (an omniscient narrator whose knowledge exceeds that of any character), internal focalisation (the narrative is filtered through a character's consciousness), and external focalisation (the narrator reports only what is externally observable, knowing less than the characters).

The concept was substantially refined by Mieke Bal, who recast focalisation as a relationship between a focaliser (the agent whose perception orients the narrative) and the focalised (the object of that perception). Focalisation has become one of the central analytical categories in narratology, with applications in literary criticism and film studies.

== Genette's typology ==
Genette proposed focalisation as part of the category of mood (mode) in his systematic framework for narrative analysis. He distinguished three types based on the relationship between the narrator's knowledge and the characters' knowledge:

- Zero focalisation (or non-focalised narrative): The narrator knows more than any character and can move freely between characters' minds. This corresponds to the traditional "omniscient narrator".
- Internal focalisation: The narrative is restricted to what a single character perceives, knows, or thinks. Genette further distinguished fixed internal focalisation (consistently through one character, as in Henry James's The Ambassadors), variable internal focalisation (shifting between characters, as in Gustave Flaubert's Madame Bovary), and multiple internal focalisation (the same event seen through different characters, as in epistolary novels).
- External focalisation: The narrator reports only externally observable actions and speech, without access to any character's thoughts. Genette compared this to a "camera eye" perspective, as in Dashiell Hammett's novels and many of Ernest Hemingway's short stories (e.g., "The Killers").

Genette noted that these types rarely appear in pure form throughout an entire work; most narratives involve shifts or combinations of focalisation, and "any single formula of focalization does not, therefore, always bear on an entire work, but rather on a definite narrative section."

== Bal's refinement ==
Mieke Bal argued that Genette's typology conflated the subject and object of perception. In her reformulation, focalisation is a relationship between two entities:

- The focaliser (or focalizing agent): the entity whose perception orients the narrative—who sees, hears, or otherwise senses.
- The focalised (or focalised object): what is perceived—a character, setting, event, or idea.

Bal further distinguished between a character-bound focaliser (internal to the story, yielding a subjective perspective) and an external focaliser (outside the story, producing a more detached view). This two-level model allows analysts to ask not only through whom the reader perceives, but also what is being perceived, and with what degree of subjective colouring.

Bal's refinement has been influential but also debated. Genette himself responded critically in Narrative Discourse Revisited (1988), defending his original categories while acknowledging some of Bal's points.

== Focalisation and related concepts ==
Focalisation overlaps with but is distinct from several related narratological concepts:

- Point of view: The broader, more traditional term. Genette introduced focalisation specifically to disambiguate point of view, which had been used inconsistently to refer to both perception and narration.
- Free indirect speech (or free indirect discourse): A narrative technique in which a character's thoughts or speech are rendered in the narrator's voice without explicit attribution. Free indirect speech often signals internal focalisation, blending the character's subjectivity with the narrator's discourse. Virginia Woolf's Mrs Dalloway exemplifies a "roving trajectory of focalisation" achieved partly through free indirect discourse.
- Unreliable narrator: When a first-person narrator's account is not to be trusted, the reader must distinguish between the narrator's focalisation and the implied author's perspective.

== See also ==
- Gérard Genette
- Mieke Bal
- Narratology
- Point of view (literature)
- Free indirect speech
- Unreliable narrator
- Narration

== Bibliography ==
- Bal, Mieke (2009) [1985]. Narratology: Introduction to the Theory of Narrative (3rd ed.). University of Toronto Press. ISBN 978-1-4426-9222-0.
- Genette, Gérard (1980) [1972]. Narrative Discourse: An Essay in Method. Translated by Lewin, Jane E. New York: Cornell University Press. ISBN 9780801410994.
- Genette, Gérard (1988). Narrative Discourse Revisited. Translated by Lewin, Jane E. Ithaca: Cornell University Press. ISBN 978-0-8014-1758-0.
- Niederhoff, Burkhard (2011). "Focalization". The Living Handbook of Narratology. Hamburg University.
