= Free indirect speech =

Style of narration

Free indirect speech is the literary technique of writing a character's first-person thoughts in the voice of the third-person narrator. It is a style using aspects of third-person narration conjoined with the essence of first-person direct speech. The technique is also referred to as free indirect discourse, free indirect style, or, in French, discours indirect libre.

Free indirect speech has been described as a "technique of presenting a character's voice partly mediated by the voice of the author", with their voices effectively merged. Or, reversing the emphasis: "... the character speaks through the voice of the narrator", with their voices effectively merged. It has also been described as "the illusion by which third-person narrative comes to express ... the intimate subjectivity of fictional characters." The distinguisher term "free" in the phrase indicates the technique whereby the author—instead of being fixed with the narrator or with just one character—may "roam from viewpoint to viewpoint" among several different characters. Free indirect discourse differs from indirect discourse in not announcing what it is doing. Indirect discourse: "He feared that he would be late for the party." Free indirect discourse: "He rummaged through his closet, desperately looking for something suitable to wear. He would be late for the party."

Goethe and Jane Austen were the first novelists to use this style consistently, according to British philologist Roy Pascal, and 19th-century French novelist Gustave Flaubert shows "sustained exploitation of free indirect discourse" in Madame Bovary, according to Roger Clark.

== Distinguishing marks of free indirect speech ==
Free indirect discourse can be described as a "technique of presenting a character's voice partly mediated by the voice of the author". In the words of the French narrative theorist Gérard Genette, "the narrator takes on the speech of the character, or, if one prefers, the character speaks through the voice of the narrator, and the two instances then are merged". Randall Stevenson suggests that the term free indirect discourse "is perhaps best reserved for instances where words have actually been spoken aloud"; and those cases "where a character's voice is probably the silent inward one of thought" is better described as free indirect style.

=== Description ===
Following are modifications of text that compare direct, normal indirect, and free indirect speech.

- **Quoted** or **direct speech** or narrator's voice: He laid down his bundle and thought of his misfortune. "And just what pleasure have I found, since I came into this world?**" he asked.**
- **Reported** or normal indirect speech: He laid down his bundle and thought of his misfortune. **He asked himself** what pleasure he had found since he came into the world.
- Free indirect speech: He laid down his bundle and thought of his misfortune. And just what pleasure had he found, since he came into this world?

Free indirect speech is characterized by the actions or features described below. Some text features referenced below are bolded italic in the panel above—which features are intentionally dropped from the Free indirect speech line of narrative.

- Drops quotation marks and 'introductory' expressions such as "he asked" or "she said". In effect, the subordinate clause carrying the content of the indirect speech is taken out of its main clause, and becomes the main clause itself.
- Conveys the character's words more directly than in normal indirect speech, using devices—such as interjections and psycho-ostensive expressions, including curses and swearwords—that normally aren't used within a subordinate clause. When adverbials or deictic pronouns are used, they refer to the coordinates not of the narrator, but to those of the character, i.e., the speaker or thinker.
- Uses linguistic features indicating a character's current perspective and voice stated within a third-person, past-tense narrative.
- Previous judgements, exclamations, opinions, etc, are backshifted, such as, "How differently did every thing now appear in which he was concerned", an example from Pride and Prejudice.
- Modals are not shifted, such as, "She must own that she was tired of great houses", also from Pride and Prejudice.
- Exclamatory questions, character-specific locutions, and syntactical informalities and fragments are used.

=== Jane Austen experiments with free indirect speech ===
In free indirect speech, the thoughts and speech of any one character can be written as interior thought (of the character) but with the voice of the narrator. Jane Austen also used it to provide summaries of conversations or to compress a character's speech and thoughts—according to Austen scholars Anthony Mandal and Norman Page. In Sense and Sensibility (1811), her first-published novel, Austen first experimented with this technique.

For example,

[1] Mrs John Dashwood did not at all approve of what her husband intended to do for his sisters. [2] To take three thousand pounds from the fortune of their dear little boy, would be impoverishing him to the most dreadful degree. [3] She begged him to think again on the subject. [4] How could he answer it to himself to rob his child, and his only child too, of so large a sum? [Numeration added]

Page explains that "the first [1st] sentence is straight narrative, in the 'voice' of the [narrator]; the third [3rd] sentence is normal indirect speech; but the second [2nd] and fourth [4th] are what is usually described as free indirect speech." In these two sentences, Austen presents the interior thoughts of the character [Mrs John Dashwood/Fanny Dashwood] and creates the illusion that the reader is entering the character's mind. She (Austen) used indirect speech for background characters in addition to the more obvious main characters. However, as Page writes: "for Jane Austen ... the supreme virtue of free indirect speech ... [is] that it offers the possibility of achieving something of the vividness of speech without the appearance ... of a total silencing of the authorial voice." [Numeration and italics added]

== Use in literature ==
"During dinner, Mr. Bennett scarcely spoke at all; but when the servants were withdrawn, he thought it time to have some conversation with his guest, and therefore started a subject in which he expected him to shine, by observing that he seemed very fortunate in his patroness....Mr. Collins was eloquent in her praise. The subject elevated him to more than usual solemnity of manner, and with a most important aspect he protested that he had never in his life witnessed such behavior in a person of rank—such affability and condescension, as he had himself experienced from Lady Catherine. She had been graciously pleased to approve of both the discourses, which he had already had the honor of preaching before her. She had also asked him twice to dine at Rosings, and had sent for him only the Saturday before, to make up her pool of quadrille in the evening. Lady Catherine was reckoned proud by many people he knew, but he had never seen any thing but affability in her."

— This passage, from I.xiv of Pride and Prejudice, uses free indirect speech. Italics are added here to indicate where the shift to free indirect speech begins. It then continues for the remainder of the passage.

Roy Pascal cites Goethe and Jane Austen as the first novelists to use this style consistently, and writes that Gustave Flaubert was the first to be aware of it as a style. This style would be widely imitated by later authors, called in French discours indirect libre. It is also known as estilo indirecto libre in Spanish, and is often used by Latin American writer Horacio Quiroga.

In German literature, the style, known as erlebte Rede (experienced speech), is perhaps most famous in the works of Franz Kafka, blurring the subject's first-person experiences with a grammatically third-person narrative perspective. Arthur Schnitzler's novella Leutnant Gustl first published in Neue Freie Presse newspaper in 1900 is considered the earliest book length example.

In Danish literature, the style is attested since Leonora Christina (1621–1698) (and is, outside literature, even today common in colloquial Danish speech).

Some of the first sustained examples of free indirect discourse in Western literature occur in Latin literature, where the phenomenon often takes the name of oratio obliqua. It is characteristic, for instance, of the style of Julius Caesar, but it is also found in the historical work of Livy.

=== English, Irish and Scottish literature ===
As stated above, Austen was one of its first practitioners. According to Austen scholar Tom Keymer, "It has been calculated that Pride and Prejudice filters its narrative, at different points, through no fewer than nineteen centres of consciousness, more than any other Austen novel (with Mansfield Park, at thirteen, the nearest competitor)."

The American novelist Edith Wharton relies heavily on the technique in her 1905 novel The House of Mirth. And Zora Neale Hurston—the American author and anthropologist—conceived much of the development of her fictional characters around indirect speech and style. According to literary critic Henry Louis Gates Jr., Hurston, in her acclaimed novel Their Eyes Were Watching God, (1937), plotted the journey of her protagonist Janie Crawford "from object to subject" by shifting back and forth between her own (Hurston's) "literate narrator's voice and a highly idiomatic black voice found in wonderful passages of free indirect discourse". It also appears in Harper Lee’s To Kill A Mockingbird (1960), where the words of various characters are filtered through the point of view of the young narrator, Scout Finch.

Irish author James Joyce also used free indirect speech in works such as "The Dead" (in Dubliners), A Portrait of the Artist as a Young Man, and Ulysses. Scottish author James Kelman uses the style extensively, most notably in his Booker Prize winning novel How Late It Was, How Late, but also in many of his short stories and some of his novels, most of which are written in Glaswegian speech patterns. Virginia Woolf in her novels To the Lighthouse and Mrs Dalloway frequently relies on free indirect discourse to take us into the minds of her characters. Another modernist, D. H. Lawrence, also makes frequent use of a free indirect style in "transcribing unspoken or even incompletely verbalized thoughts". Lawrence most often uses free indirect speech, a literary technique that describes the interior thoughts of the characters using third-person singular pronouns ('he' and 'she') in both The Rainbow and Women in Love. According to Charles Rzepka of Boston University, Elmore Leonard's mastery of free indirect discourse "is unsurpassed in our time, and among the surest of all time, even if we include Jane Austen, Gustave Flaubert, and Hemingway in the mix."

Some argue that free indirect discourse was also used by Chaucer in The Canterbury Tales. When the narrator says in "The General Prologue" that he agrees with the Monk's opinion dismissing criticism of his very unmonastic way of life, he is apparently paraphrasing the monk himself:

And I seyde his opinion was good:
What! Sholde he studie, and make himselven wood,
Upon a book in cloistre alwey to poure?
Or swinken with his handes, and laboure,
As Austin bit? How shal the world be served?
Lat Austin have his swink to him reserved!

These rhetorical questions may be regarded as the monk's own casual way of waving off criticism of his aristocratic lifestyle. Similar examples can be found in the narrator's portrait of the friar.

=== Middle Eastern literature ===
Although Free indirect discourse (FID) is recorded as having originated in Europe with Austen, the narrative style appears in several parts of the world and their literary histories. Folktales originating from Syria and Israel and more recently transcribed from a Jewish and Neo-Aramaic dialect (Zakho) feature FID prominently in their narratives.

"The Boy," a piece of Neo-Aramaic folklore typically passed along orally and belonging to no one certain origin was transcribed and translated to English. Consequently, the FID woven into its narrative was acknowledged. During the course of the story, a newly married woman forced into the union conceals a knife under her pillow in hopes of eliminating her new partner. The narrative voices the bride's terror in response to an unexpected demand.

He tells her: first bring chocolate, (so that) we eat it. She turned blue, green, yellow. How will she go (to) bring chocolate (from) under the pillow? (After all,) she knows she (has) put a knife there!

The bolded text is representative of the author/speaker's indirect voicing of the bride's thoughts from a third person perspective.

== Significance in other fields ==
The relevance of Free indirect discourse extends beyond the subject of traditional literature. FID was identified as a journalistic technique in 1994 when two cooperating Dutch sports reporters incorporated the Free indirect style into their retelling of a soccer (American) or football (European) match.

"I thought that it [the gold] was already won," he said afterwards, still unbelieving. Lack of experience had dimmed his vision. A tactical maneuver had cost him the victory. [...][Bolding added]

The journalists incorporate their commentary into an otherwise exact description of a player's experience. They project their thoughts and opinions formulated after the matter as an internal narrative for one who was on the field.

=== Legal implications ===
In 1999, a Paris criminal court tried author Mathieu Lindon and POL (his publisher) for attempted defamation. Lindon's novel, Le Procès de Jean-Marie Le Pen, depicted a fictional trial in which the protagonist, a young lawyer (Pierre Mime), is enlisted to defend a blatant racist and murderer (Ronald Blistier). The fictional defendant is notably affiliated with the National Front, a real organization outside of the novel. Lindon's protagonist thus attempts (in the world of the novel) to pass responsibility and guilt onto the real and acting (at the time) President of the National Front, Jean-Marie Le Pen.

Lindon ran the risk of legal retribution upon bringing Le Pen into the narrative and merging the fictional world with reality. However, as he had commented on Le Pen largely via the voices of his characters, the author claimed that he had made no legitimate statement opposing the party president. Thus, character dialogue in the narrative which admonished Le Pen was considered inadmissible. The prosecution managed to convince the court of Lindon's guilt only by presenting commentary made in a free indirect style. For example, the following passage was submitted for review:

Outside, the atmosphere is less formal. There is also a certain joy among the demonstrators, in being all together, in their right, in moral symbiosis. For them, it isn't enough to treat Ronald Blistier as a killer; fighting Le Pen effectively means demanding that he be formally charged in the case, showing that he is not president of a political party but leader of a gang of killers–people would have voted for Al Capone too.

The bolded text is that which can be considered free indirect discourse. The court argued that Lindon was not entirely explicit in establishing the thoughts within the passage as those of the leftist protestors. He did not present the comment on Le Pen as a piece of dialogue which could more easily be attributed to a given character or set of characters. Later analysis of the case indicated that the phrase "For them" could have been considered a means of ascribing the rest of the bolded excerpt to the demonstrator characters, but this point was not raised in the original proceedings. The prosecution successfully argued that the passage was evidence of Lindon's intent to defame Le Pen, claiming that the characterization of the party president stemmed from the narrator/author (not having adequate evidence of alternate attribution). Lindon's use of free indirect discourse thus blurred the lines between his own expression and that of his characters.

== See also ==
- Stream of consciousness (narrative mode)
- Metalepsis – Figure of speech
