= Raphaël Baroni =

Swiss narratologist

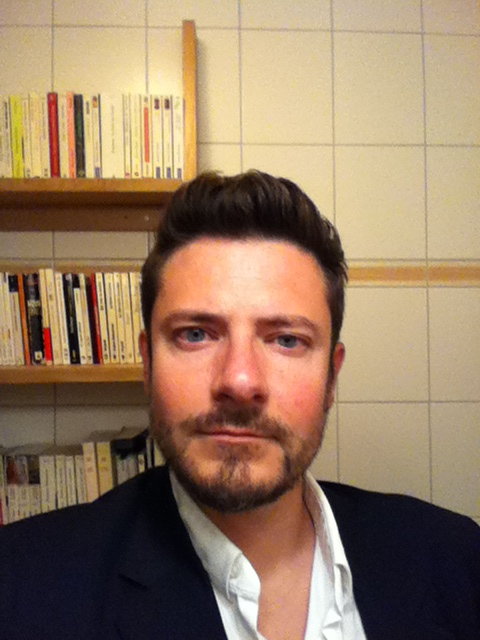
Raphaël Baroni

Raphaël Baroni (born October 17, 1970) is a Swiss narratologist. He is an associate professor in the Department of French as a foreign language at the University of Lausanne. He is mainly interested in the analysis of narrative time, plot, tellability, and sequence, in relation with narrative interest and transmedial analysis. He is the author of La tension narrative (Seuil, 2007). As summarized by Emma Kafalenos, in this book, Baroni emphasizes that:

"the source of narrative tension is the combination of uncertainty and anticipation: the perceiver’s experience of simultaneously not knowing something and wanting to know it. The uncertainty may be in regard to something that has already happened, in which case the anticipation is a form of curiosity. Or the uncertainty may be in regard to something that has not yet happened, in which case the anticipation is a form of suspense."

Baroni is also the author of L’oeuvre du temps (Seuil, 2009) and is co-editor of Narrative Sequence in Contemporary Narratology (Ohio State Univ. Press, 2016).

Raphaël Baroni is member of the advisory board of Les Cahiers de Narratologie. In 2010, he founded the Reseau des narratologues francophones (RéNaF).

== Works ==
=== Books ===
- Baroni, R. & C. Gunti (dir.) (2020) Introduction à l'étude des cultures numériques. La transition numérique des médias, Malakoff, Armand Colin.
- Baroni, R. (2017) Les Rouages de l'intrigue, Genève, Slatkine.
- Baroni, R.& F. Revaz (dir.) (2016) Narrative Sequence in Contemporary Narratology, Columbus, Ohio State University Press, coll. "Theory and Interpretation of Narrative".
- Baroni, R. (2009) L’Œuvre du temps. Poétique de la discordance narrative, Paris, Seuil, coll. "Poétique".
- Baroni, R. (2007) La Tension narrative. Suspense, curiosité, surprise, Paris, Seuil, coll. "Poétique".
- Baroni, R. & M. Macé (dir.) (2007) Le Savoir des genres, Rennes, Presses Universitaires de Rennes, coll. "La Licorne".

=== Article ===
- Baroni, R. (2009) "Tellability" in Handbook of Narratology, J. Pier, W. Schmid, J. Schönert, P. Hühn (dir.), Berlin & New York, Walter de Gruyter.

== See also ==
- Narratology
- Suspense
