= Non-diegetic insert =

In film, diegesis refers to the story world, and the events that occur within it. Thus, non-diegesis are things which occur outside the story-world.

A Non-diegetic insert is a film technique that combines a shot or a series of shots cut into a sequence, showing objects represented as being outside the space of the narrative. Put more simply, a non-diegetic insert is a scene that is outside the story world which is "inserted" into the story world. Diegetic could also refer to sound in media or film studies. The term non-diegetic insert was delineated by film theorist Christian Metz in his typology of film editing known as Grand Syntagmatique. Metz classified non-diegetic inserts as a specific type of autonomous shot; differentiating it from other kinds of autonomous shots such as the single-shot sequence, the displaced diegetic insert, the subjective insert, and the explanatory insert.

== Examples ==
- Three images shown during the disastrous opening night of the play in The Band Wagon, as a metaphor to highlight how much of a flop the show is.
- Sky sequences shown in Gus Van Sant's Elephant.
- Most famously in The Great Train Robbery a bandit, either following the character's death or before the narrative began, shot his gun directly at the audience.
- Starting scene of Charlie Chaplin's film Modern Times.
