= Metalepsis =

Figure of speech

Metalepsis (from Ancient Greek: μετάληψις, metálēpsis) is a figure of speech in which a word or a phrase from figurative speech is used in a new context. Ancient Roman academic Quintilian described metalepsis as a bridging term , an "intermediate step" between the original term and what it is transferred to. Harold Bloom called metalepsis a "metonymy of a metonymy" because it uses part of an established trope to refer to the whole.

== Examples ==
- "I've got to catch the worm tomorrow."
  - "The early bird catches the worm" is a common maxim, advising an early start on the day to achieve success. The subject, by referring to this maxim, is compared to the bird; tomorrow, the speaker will awaken early in order to achieve success.
- "He's been rescued from the rabbit hole."
  - The adage "fall down the rabbit hole" refers to being deeply invested in a specific topic. In this example, being rescued from the rabbit hole adapts the original meaning to convey that someone has stopped being deeply invested in a specific topic.

== In Icelandic literature ==
The word twikent (twice-kenned) is used for once-removed metalepsis involving kennings. If a kenning has more than three elements, it is said to be rekit ('extended'). Kennings of up to seven elements are recorded in skaldic verse. Snorri Sturluson characterises five-element kennings as an acceptable license but cautions against more extreme constructions:

Níunda er þat at reka til hinnar fimtu kenningar, er ór ættum er ef lengra er rekit; en þótt þat finnisk í fornskálda verka, þá látum vér þat nú ónýtt.

The ninth [license] is extending a kenning to the fifth determinant, but it is out of proportion if it is extended further. Even if it can be found in the works of ancient poets, we no longer tolerate it.

— Snorri Sturluson

The longest kenning found in skaldic poetry refers to a warrior:

nausta blakks hlé-mána gífrs drífu gim-slöngvir

fire-brandisher of blizzard of ogress of protection-moon of steed of boat-shed

— Þórðr Sjáreksson, Þórálfs drápa Skólmssonar

== Narratology ==
In narratology (and specifically in the theories of Gérard Genette), a paradoxical transgression of the boundaries between narrative levels or logically distinct worlds is also called metalepsis.

Perhaps the most common example of metalepsis in narrative occurs when a narrator intrudes upon another world being narrated. In general, narratorial metalepsis arises most often when an omniscient or external narrator begins to interact directly with the events being narrated, especially if the narrator is separated in space and time from these events.

There are so many examples of forking-path and metaleptic narratives by now that any recommendations will have to seem arbitrary. One of the most thoroughly enjoyable constructions of enigmatic worlds within worlds is Nabokov's Pale Fire (1962). A good short text is Robert Coover's The Babysitter (1969). In film, a frequently referenced forking-path narrative is Peter Howitt's Sliding Doors (1998).

[In Tom] Stoppard's The Real Inspector Hound, the framing diegetic situation is here equally a theatre. In this fictional theatre a whodunnit is performed, witnessed by an audience which includes two theatre critics. In the course of the embedded performance these critics become paradoxically involved in the hypodiegetic play within a play, an involvement which even leads to the death of one of them. Thus, as in the case of Pirandello's Sei personaggi, the typical traits of a metalepsis can here also be recognized: a fictional representation consisting of several distinct worlds and levels, among which unorthodox transgression occur.

== See also ==
- Catachresis
- Metonymy
- Kenning (traditional form of metalepsis)

== Bibliography ==
- Genette, Gérard (2004). Métalepse. De la figure à la fiction. Paris: Seuil.
- Kuhn-Treichel, Thomas (2023). Metaleptische Bilder des Erzählens. Von der Antike bis zur Gegenwart [Metaleptic Images of Narration: From Antiquity to the Present Age]. Narratologia, vol. 89. Berlin/Boston: de Gruyter, ISBN 978-3-11-131736-6.
- Kukkonen, Karin and Klimek, Sonja (eds.). Metalepsis in Popular Culture. (Narratologia, 28.) Berlin: De Gruyter 2011. ISBN 978-3-11-025278-1 ISSN 1612-8427
- Pier, John (2013). "Metalepsis" in the living handbook of narratology
