= Narreme =

Basic unit of narrative structure

The narreme is the basic unit of narrative structure. According to Helmut Bonheim, the concept of narreme was developed three decades earlier by Eugene Dorfman and expanded by Henri Wittmann, the narreme is to narratology what the sememe is to semantics, the morpheme is to morphology and the phoneme to phonology. However, narremes have yet to be persuasively defined in practice.

In interpretative narratology constrained in a framework of principles and parameters, narration is the projection of a narreme N^{0}, the abstract head of a narrative macrostructure where N^{n} dominates immediately N^{n-1}. (Note: In this author's views, narremes are the constituents of narrative algorithms, a concept that has found applications in game theory and game semantics)

== See also ==
- Mytheme
- Narratology
- Narrative
- Narrative structure

== Bibliography ==
- Schärfe, Henrik. 2004. CANA: A study in computer-aided narrative analysis. Aalborg University, Dept. of Communication: Ph.D. dissertation.
