= Palimpsest (geology) =

Geographical feature

In geology and geomorphology, a palimpsest is a landscape or geological feature that preserves evidence of multiple phases of development, in which earlier landforms or surface characteristics are partially modified, obscured, or overprinted by later processes. In glaciology, it is sometimes applied to landscapes or bedrock surfaces that record successive episodes of ice flow, for example where younger striations overprint older glacial features.

The name arises by analogy to a medieval palimpsest, a reused parchment manuscript page in which the previous text can sometimes be deciphered.

== See also ==
- Palimpsest (planetary astronomy)
- Palimpsest (disambiguation)
