= Palimpsests: Literature in the Second Degree =

1982 book by Gérard Genette

- Author: Gérard Genette
- Original title: Palimpsestes : la littérature au second degré
- Translators: Channa Newman and Claude Doubinsky
- Language: French
- Publisher: Éditions du Seuil
- Publication date: 1982
- Publication place: Paris, France
- English publication date: 1997
- Pages: 467
- ISBN: 978-2-02-006116-2

Palimpsests: Literature in the Second Degree is a 1982 book by French literary theorist Gérard Genette. Over the years, the book's methodological proposals have been confirmed as effective operational definitions, and have been widely adopted in literary criticism terminology.

The book is also highly regarded for his wide and far-reaching conceptualization of parody. In the book Genette coined the term paratext, which has since become widespread to denote prefaces, introductions, illustrations or other material accompanying the text, or hypotext for the sources of the text.
