= Hypertext (semiotics) =

Text related to an earlier work or hypotext

Hypertext, in semiotics, is a text which alludes to, derives from, or relates to an earlier work or hypotext (a subsequent of a hypotext). For example, James Joyce's Ulysses could be regarded as one of the many hypertexts deriving from Homer's Odyssey; Angela Carter's "The Tiger's Bride" can be considered a hypertext which relates to an earlier work, or hypotext, the original fairy-story Beauty and the Beast. Hypertexts may take a variety of forms including imitation, parody, and pastiche.

The word was defined by the French theorist Gérard Genette as follows: "Hypertextuality refers to any relationship uniting a text B (which I shall call the hypertext) to an earlier text A (I shall, of course, call it the hypotext), upon which it is grafted in a manner that is not that of commentary". So, a hypertext derives from hypotext(s) through a process which Genette calls transformation, in which text B "evokes" text A without necessarily mentioning it directly".

Note that this technical use of the word in semiotics differs from its use in the field of computing, although the two are related. Liestøl's study of Genette's narratological model and hyperfiction considers how they are related and suggests that hyperfiction narratives have four levels:

- 1. Discourse as discoursed;
- 2. Discourse as stored;
- 3. Story as discoursed;
- 4. Stories as stored (potential story lines).
