= Narrative-based learning =

Narrative-based learning is a learning model grounded in the theory that humans define their experiences within the context of narratives – which serve as cognitive structures and a means of communication, as well as aiding people in framing and understanding their perceptions of the world. Narrative contextualises abstract concepts and provides a scaffold for the transfer of knowledge within specific contexts and environments. This model aligns with the constructivist ideals of situated learning—which theorises that active learning takes place within the context in which the knowledge must be applied. Anchored Instruction is a type of situated learning that presents students with a realistic narrative within a specific context. At the narrative's core is a problem that must be solved by constructing and applying the knowledge within the targeted learning domain.

Using narratives to support learning and cognition dates back to early human culture and remains an important technique in modern classroom instruction. However, narrative techniques for learning are also increasingly ubiquitous in virtual environments such as a serious game or Instructional Simulation.

== Narrative in virtual learning environments ==
While linear narratives progress along a predefined path, branching stories are interactive and afford varying degrees of user control—both at decision points and within the learning environment itself. Although branching narratives more faithfully address the design implications of Malone's four factors of learner motivation (challenge, curiosity, control, and fantasy), such narrative environments become infinitely more complex (from a design and development perspective) with each new user decision point.

As the narrative environment becomes more technically and logically complex, designers risk losing the ability to simulate narrative presence—a user's sense of being embedded as a full participant within a story (independent of physical location) and free to influence narrative outcomes and the virtual environment. Factors that affect the level of narrative presence include spatial presence, involvement, realness, immersion quality, drama, interface awareness, exploration, and predictability. Although users are typically more engaged when they have more control over the environment and its narrative, the type and number of algorithms necessary to manage the branching structures introduce the potential for an incoherent and inconsistent user experience. To stimulate a strong sense of narrative presence, designers must overcome these challenges and ensure that the story (and its elements) remain coherent and consistent throughout the learning intervention.

=== Interactive narrative management ===
Two strategies exist for managing narratives within interactive systems: artificial intelligence (AI) and human moderation.

==== Artificial intelligence ====
Narrative Intelligence enables an AI engine to dynamically generate descriptions based on users' actions at various points within the story. Solutions include:

- Scripted intelligent agents may serve as characters in an online learning environment to guide students, offer feedback and clarification, or provide scripted responses to questions. They may also provide dialogue and background to the narrative.
- Autonomous intelligent agents are system-controlled characters enabled to act and make decisions within the virtual environment that affect narrative outcomes.
- Drama managers monitor user and agent character activity and attempt to subtly influence the user toward a particular action to maintain the core narrative. In addition to character interaction, the system may alter sensory and contextual information within the environment to elicit the targeted user response.

==== Human moderation ====
Alternate reality games (ARGs) are an example of a human-controlled (and therefore flexible) narrative game framework capable of adapting to users' decisions in real-time. ARGs are typically moderated by the game designers (known as puppet masters) -- who remain unseen throughout the narrative but act "simultaneously [as] allies and adversaries to the player base, creating obstacles and providing resources for overcoming them in the course of telling the game's story."

=== Emergent Narrative ===
One form of emergent narrative is an unscripted instructional multi-user environment (MUVE) in which the overarching story emerges based on the specific interactions between narrative elements, characters, and causal links – the specific combinations of which will be unique to each user. Emergent stories arise from the interactions of a multiplicity of characters – each with different goals, personalities, and other motivating factors – and all with free will to make decisions within the virtual environment.
