= Fabula and syuzhet =

Terms describing narrative construction

Timeline of fabula vs syuzhet in Memento

In narratology, fabula (Russian: фабула, IPA: [ˈfabʊlə]) refers to the chronological sequence of events within the world of a narrative and syuzhet (Russian: сюжет, IPA: [sʲʊˈʐɛt]) refers to the time of its telling, the sequence of events as they are presented to the reader. Vladimir Propp and Viktor Shklovsky originated the terminology as part of the Russian Formalism movement in the early 20th century. Narratologists have described fabula as "the raw material of a story", and syuzhet as "the way a story is organized".

Classical narratives tend to have synchronous fabula and syuzhet, but they may be treated asynchronously according to a modern or postmodern style. Films and novels often achieve an asynchronous effect via flashbacks or flashforwards. For example, the film Citizen Kane starts with the main character's death, and then tells his life through flashbacks interspersed with a journalist's present-time investigation of Kane's life. The fabula of the film is the actual story of Kane's life the way it happened in chronological order, while the syuzhet is the way the story is told throughout the movie, including flashbacks.

== See also ==
- Nonlinear narrative
- Organizational storytelling
- Story arc
- Storytelling
- Lisible
- Plot (narrative)
- Narratology
- Seed theory
- Chronotope, Bakhtin's concept of how configurations of time and space are represented in language and discourse
- Memento, a film representing an example of a story told in nonlinear fashion
- Mouthwashing, an example of a video game with a nonlinear story

== Sources ==
- Aristotle. Poetics.
- Bakhtin, M. (1973). Problems of Dostoevsky's Poetics (C. Emerson, ed. and trans.). Manchester, England: Manchester University Press.
- Bakhtin, M. (1981). The Dialogic Imagination: Four Essays by M.M. Bakhtin (ed. Holquist, M.). Austin: University of Texas Press.
- Benjamin, W. (1969). The Storyteller: Observations on the Works of Nikolai Leskov, in Illuminations (Ed. Hannah Arendt, trans. Harry Zohn). New York: Schoken Books.
- Boje, D. M. (2001). Narrative Methods for Organizational and Communication Research. London: Sage.
- Bruner, Jerome. (1986). Actual Minds, Possible Worlds. Cambridge, MASS.: Harvard University Press.
- Cox, James. (2006). Muting White Noise: The Subversion of Popular Culture Narratives of Conquest in Sherman Alexie's Fiction. University of Oklahoma Press.
- Culler, Jonathan. (1981). The Pursuit of Signs: Semiotics, Literature, Deconstruction. Ithaca, NY: Cornell University Press.
- Derrida, Jacques. (1979). ‘Living On – Border Lines’ in Deconstruction and Criticism (NY: Seabury Press, edited by Harold Bloom et al., 1979).
- King, Thomas. (2003). The Truth about Stories: A Native Narrative. Toronto: House of Ananasi.
- Mos, Leendert (February 2003). "Jerome Bruner: Language, Culture, Self". Canadian Psychology. Archived from the original on June 23, 2008 – via FindArticles.
- Propp, Vladimir. (1928/1968). Morphology of the Folk Tale. English trans. Laurence Scott. TX: University of Texas Press (first published in Moscow in 1928; English, 1968).
- Shklovsky, Viktor. (1917/1965). Art as Technique in L T Lemon and M Reis, eds., (1965) Russian Formalist Criticism. University of Nebraska Press.
- Shotter, John (1993). Conversational Realities. London: Sage.
- Silko, Leslie Marmon. (1981). Storyteller. NY: Arcade Publishing
- Whorf, Benjamin Lee (1956). Language, Thought and Reality - Selected Writings.
