= Suspense =

State of mental uncertainty

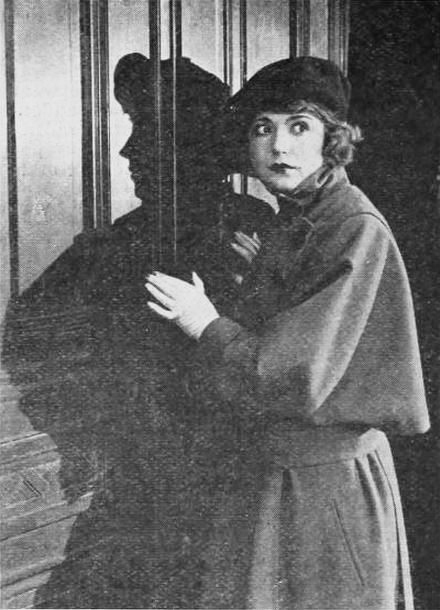
A frame of actress Mollie King in the 1919 film Suspense

Suspense is a state of anxiety or excitement caused by mysteriousness, uncertainty, doubt, or undecidedness. In a narrative work, suspense is the audience's excited anticipation about the plot or conflict (which may be heightened by a violent moment, stressful scene, puzzle, mystery, etc.), particularly as it affects a character for whom the audience feels sympathy. However, suspense is not exclusive to narratives.

== In narratives ==
In literature, films, television, and plays, suspense is a major device for securing and maintaining interest. It may be of several major types: in one, the outcome is uncertain and the suspense resides in the question of who, what, or how; in another, the outcome is inevitable from foregoing events, and the suspense resides in the audience's anxious or frightened anticipation in the question of when. Readers feel suspense when they are deeply curious about what will happen next or when they know what is likely to happen but do not know how it will happen. Even in historical fiction, with characters whose life stories are well known, the why usually brings suspense to the novel.

An adjunct to suspense is foreshadowing, as found in hints of national crisis or revolution in Isabel Allende's House of the Spirits (1982).

=== Examples ===
- In Sophocles's Oedipus Rex (429 B.C.), suspense is achieved through a withholding of the knowledge that Oedipus killed Laius, his father. During the play, the spectators, aware that Oedipus will eventually make the discovery, share the hero's uncertainties and fears as he pursues the truth of his own past.
- Several writers refer to "dramatic tension" in the biblical Book of Genesis. Walter Brueggemann refers to dramatic tension revolving around "the faithful, anguished, respectful purpose of the Creator, and creation's mixed response of obedience and recalcitrance." For example, in Genesis 13, Abram (later Abraham) and Lot, his nephew, go their separate ways. In contrast, R. N. Whybray identifies a slow narrative pace in Genesis 32:1-21, where Jacob's anticipation of conflict with his brother serves "to increase the dramatic tension."
- In George Washington Cable's story "Jean-ah Poquelin" (1875), the reader wants to know the cause of the strange smell and the unexplained disappearance of a brother.
- In Mark Twain's Pudd'nhead Wilson (1895), the reader anticipates the outcome of the switching of a black infant with a white infant.
- In Ernest J. Gaines's A Gathering of Old Men (1983), the reader waits for the court's decision at a murder trial.

== Paradox of suspense ==
Some authors have tried to explain the "paradox of suspense": a narrative tension that remains effective even when uncertainty is neutralized because repeat audiences know exactly how the story resolves. Some theories assume that true repeat audiences are extremely rare because, in reiteration, people usually forget many details of the story, and interest arises due to these holes of memory; others claim that uncertainty remains even for often told stories because, during the immersion in the fictional world, people forget fictionally what we know factually, or because the audience expects fictional worlds to look like the real world where exact repetition of an event is impossible.

The position of Robert Yanal postulates that narrative tension that remains effective in true repetition should be clearly distinguished from genuine suspense because uncertainty is part of the definition of suspense. Raphaël Baroni proposes to name rappel this kind of suspense whose excitement relies on the ability of the audience to anticipate perfectly what is to come. This is a precognition that is particularly enjoyable for children dealing with well-known fairy tales. Baroni adds that another kind of suspense without uncertainty can emerge with the occasional contradiction between what the reader knows about the future (cognition) and what he desires (volition), especially in tragedy, when the protagonist eventually dies or fails (suspense par contradiction).

== See also ==
- Adrenaline
- Cliffhanger
- Conflict (narrative)
- Fear
- Mystery fiction
- Mystery film
- Pace (narrative)
- Plot twist
- Red herring
- Thriller (genre)
