= Palimpsest (podcast) =

Horror podcast

- Genre: Horror, fantasy, and psychological realism
- Language: English

Creative team
- Created by: Jamieson Ridenhour & Hayley Heninger

Production
- Length: 20–30 Minutes

Publication
- No. of seasons: 4+
- No. of episodes: 43
- Original release: October 31, 2017
- Updates: Bi-weekly

Related
- Related shows: The Black Tapes; The NoSleep Podcast; Welcome to Night Vale
- Website: www.thepalimpsestpodcast.com

Palimpsest is a horror podcast created by Jamieson Ridenhour and Hayley Heninger with music by Ian Ridenhour.

== Background ==
The show is a slow-paced psychological horror and ghost story. The first season is composed of a series of audio diaries recorded by Anneliese. In the wake of her sister Claire’s death, Anneliese moves to a new apartment and begins seeing and hearing things that aren't there. The story is read by a single narrator. The show was created by Jamieson Ridenhour and Hayley Heninger. The show releases episodes on a bi-weekly basis and the music is composed by Ian Ridenhour. The first four seasons are each a ten part series. The show is produced in Asheville, NC. The show released its third season in 2020.

== See also ==
- List of horror podcasts
