= Narratology =

Study of narrative structures

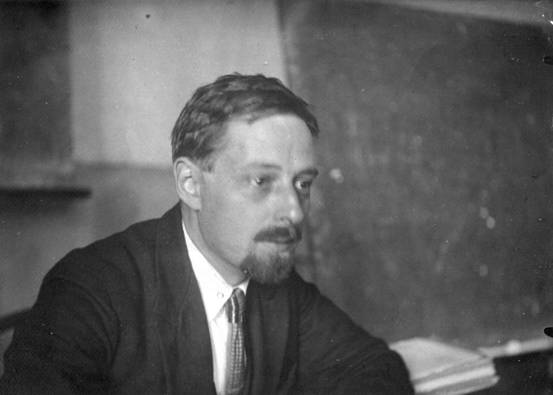
Vladimir Propp in 1928. Literary historian, university professor, linguist, writer, and Soviet philologist. Precursor of narratology.

Narratology is the study of narrative and narrative structure and the ways that these affect human perception. The term is an anglicisation of French narratologie, coined by Tzvetan Todorov (Grammaire du Décaméron, 1969). Its theoretical lineage is traceable to Aristotle (Poetics) but modern narratology is agreed to have begun with the Russian formalists, particularly Vladimir Propp (Morphology of the Folktale, 1928), and Mikhail Bakhtin's theories of heteroglossia, dialogism, and the chronotope first presented in The Dialogic Imagination (1975).

Cognitive narratology is a more recent development that allows for a broader understanding of narrative. Rather than focus on the structure of the story, cognitive narratology asks "how humans make sense of stories" and "how humans use stories as sense-making instruments".

== Defining narrative ==
Structuralist narratologists like Rimmon-Kenan define narrative fiction as "the narration of a succession of fictional events".

Cognitive narratologists focus on how people experience something as narrative rather than on the structure of the text itself. The six-word story "For sale: baby shoes, never worn", is often given as an example that would not qualify as a narrative in the strictly structural approach, but that evokes a sense of narrative.

Marie-Laure Ryan distinguishes between "a narrative" as an object that can be clearly defined and the quality of narrativity, which means "being able to inspire a narrative response". This allows her to understand video games as possessing narrativity without necessarily being conventional narratives. Astrid Ensslin builds upon this, explaining that "games have the potential to evoke multiple, individualized narrative scripts through world-building, causal event design, character development and other elements that players interact with the intention to solve problems and make progress".

== History ==
The origins of narratology lend to it a strong association with the structuralist quest for a formal system of useful description applicable to any narrative content, by analogy with the grammars used as a basis for parsing sentences in some forms of linguistics. This procedure does not however typify all work described as narratological today; Percy Lubbock's work in point of view (The Craft of Fiction, 1921) offers a case in point.

In 1966 a special issue of the journal Communications proved highly influential, becoming considered a program for research into the field and even a manifesto. It included articles by Roland Barthes, Claude Brémond, Gérard Genette, Algirdas Julien Greimas, Tzvetan Todorov and others, which in turn often referred to the works of Vladimir Propp (1895–1970).

Jonathan Culler (2001) describes narratology as comprising many strands

implicitly united in the recognition that narrative theory requires a distinction between "story," a sequence of actions or events conceived as independent of their manifestation in discourse, and "discourse," the discursive presentation or narration of events.'

The Russian Formalists first proposed such a distinction, employing the couplet fabula and syuzhet. A subsequent succession of alternate pairings has preserved the essential binomial impulse, e.g. histoire/discours, histoire/récit, story/plot. The Structuralist assumption that one can investigate fabula and syuzhet separately gave birth to two quite different traditions: thematic (Propp, Bremond, Greimas, Dundes, et al.) and modal (Genette, Prince, et al.) narratology. The former is mainly limited to a semiotic formalization of the sequences of the actions told, while the latter examines the manner of their telling, stressing voice, point of view, the transformation of the chronological order, rhythm, and frequency. Many authors (Sternberg, 1993, Ricoeur, 1984, and Baroni, 2007) have insisted that thematic and modal narratology should not be looked at separately, especially when dealing with the function and interest of narrative sequence and plot.

== Applications ==
Designating work as narratological is to some extent dependent more on the academic discipline in which it takes place than any theoretical position advanced. The approach is applicable to any narrative, and in its classic studies, vis-a-vis Propp, non-literary narratives were commonly taken up. Still, the term "narratology" is most typically applied to literary theory and literary criticism, as well as film theory and (to a lesser extent) film criticism. Atypical applications of narratological methodologies would include sociolinguistic studies of oral storytelling (William Labov) and in conversation analysis or discourse analysis that deal with narratives arising in the course of spontaneous verbal interaction. It also includes the study of videogames, graphic novels, the infinite canvas, and narrative sculptures linked to topology and graph theory. However, constituent analysis of a type where narremes are considered to be the basic units of narrative structure could fall within the areas of linguistics, semiotics, or literary theory.

== In new media ==
Digital-media theorist and professor Janet Murray theorized a shift in storytelling and narrative structure in the twentieth century as a result of scientific advancement in her 1998 book Hamlet on the Holodeck: The Future of Narrative in Cyberspace. Murray argues that narrative structures such as the multi-narrative more accurately reflected "post-Einstein physics" and the new perceptions of time, process, and change, than the traditional linear narrative. The unique properties of computers are better-suited for expressing these "limitless, intersecting" stories or "cyberdramas". These cyberdramas differ from traditional forms of storytelling in that they invite the reader into the narrative experience through interactivity i.e. hypertext fiction and Web soap The Spot. Murray also controversially declared that video games – particularly role-playing games and life-simulators like The Sims, contain narrative structures or invite the users to create them. She supported this idea in her article "Game Story to Cyberdrama" in which she argued that stories and games share two important structures: contest and puzzles.

=== Electronic literature and cybertext ===
Development and exclusive consumption of digital devices and interactivity are key characteristics of electronic literature. This has resulted in varying narrative structures of these interactive media. Nonlinear narratives serve as the base of many interactive fictions. Sometimes used interchangeably with hypertext fiction, the reader or player plays a significant role in the creation of a unique narrative developed by the choices they make within the story-world. Stuart Moulthrop's Victory Garden is one of the first and most studied examples of hypertext fiction, featuring 1,000 lexias and 2,800 hyperlinks.

In his book Cybertext: Perspectives on Ergodic Literature, Espen Aarseth conceived the concept of cybertext, a subcategory of ergodic literature, to explain how the medium and mechanical organization of the text affects the reader's experience:

...when you read from a cybertext, you are constantly reminded of inaccessible strategies and paths not taken, voices not heard. Each decision will make some parts of the text more, and others less, accessible, and you may never know the exact results of your choices; that is, exactly what you missed.

The narrative structure or game-worlds of these cybertexts are compared to a labyrinth that invites the player, a term Aarseth deems more appropriate than the reader, to play, explore and discover paths within these texts. Two kinds of labyrinths that are referenced by Aarseth are the unicursal labyrinth which holds one single, winding path that leads to a hidden center, and the multicursal labyrinth, synonymous with a maze, which is branching and complex with the path and direction chosen by the player. These concepts help to distinguish between ergodic (unicursal) and nonergodic literature (multicursal). Some works such as Vladimir Nabokov's Pale Fire have proven to potentially be both depending on the path the reader takes.

== Theorists ==
Art critic and philosopher, Arthur Danto, refers to the narrative as describing two separate events. Narrative is also linked to language. The way a story can be manipulated by a character, or in the display of medium contributes to how a story is seen by the world. Narratology, as defined by Shlomith Rimmon-Kenan, is a branch of narrative theory. The concept of narratology was developed mainly in France during the sixties and seventies. Theorists have argued for a long time about the form and context of narratology. American psychologist Robert Sternberg argued that narratology is "structuralism at variance with the idea of structure". This basis goes with the French-American belief that narratology is a logical perversion, meaning that it followed a course that at the time did not seem logical. Another theorist Peter Brooks sees narrative as being designed and having intent which is what shapes the structure of a story. Narrative theorist Roland Barthes argues that all narratives have similar structures and in every sentence, there are multiple meanings. Barthes sees literature as "writerly text" which does not need a typical plot that has a beginning, middle, and end. Instead, written work "has multiple entrances and exits." Theorist Greimas agrees with other theorists by acknowledging that there is a structure in narrative and set out to find the deep structure of narrativity. However, in his findings, Greimas says that narratology can be used to describe phenomena outside of the written word and linguistics as a whole. He establishes a connection between the physical form of something and the language used to describe that something which breaks the structural code that many other theorists base their research on.

== See also ==
- Digital storytelling
- Dramatica Theory of Story Structure (software)
- Focalisation
- Narrative
- Narrative criticism
- Narrative structure
- Narreme as the basic unit of structural narratology
- Post-structuralism
- Storytelling
- Suspense
- Glossary of narratology
