= Mieke Bal =

Dutch cultural theorist and video artist

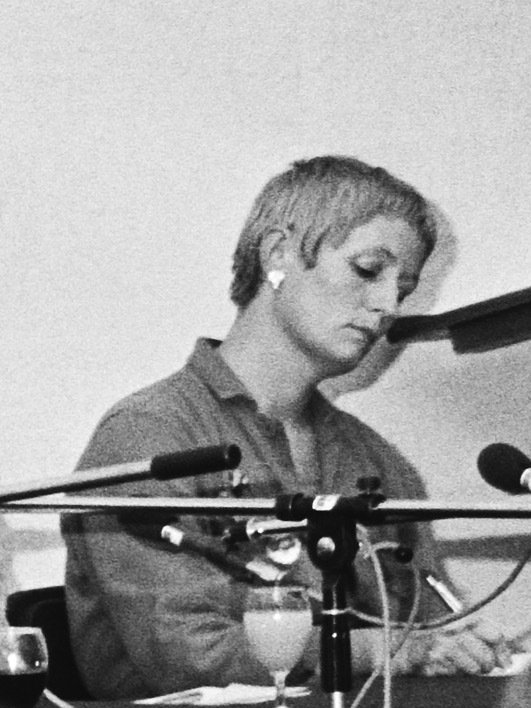
- Mieke Bal (1980)
- Born: March 14, 1946 (age 80); Heemstede, Netherlands
- Occupations: cultural theorist, video artist
- Years active: 1969 – present

Maria Gertrudis "Mieke" Bal (born 14 March 1946) is a Dutch cultural theorist, video artist, and Professor Emerita in Literary Theory at the University of Amsterdam. Previously, she was also Academy Professor of the Royal Netherlands Academy of Arts and Sciences and co-founder of the Amsterdam School for Cultural Analysis at the University of Amsterdam.

== Education and academic career ==
Bal attended the University of Amsterdam, where she obtained a M.A. in French in 1969. She continued her postgraduate studies in Amsterdam under supervision of Professor Jan Kamerbeek, but due to the death of her supervisor in 1977 she was awarded her Ph.D. in French and Comparative Literature at Utrecht University.

Bal was Professor of Semiotics and Women's Studies at Utrecht University (1987–1991) and Chair of the Section of Comparative Literature as well as Susan B. Anthony Professor of Women's Studies at the University of Rochester (1987–1991). She remained associated with the University of Rochester as Visiting Professor of Visual and Cultural Studies (1991–1996) while filling the position of Professor of Literary Theory at the University of Amsterdam (1991–2011).

From 1993 to 1995 Bal was the Founding Director of the Amsterdam School for Cultural Analysis, a research institute and doctoral school devoted to the comparative and interdisciplinary study of culture.

In 2005 the Royal Netherlands Academy of Arts and Sciences awarded Bal with an Academy Professorship, a prestigious grant given to senior researchers for exceptional achievement throughout their career. The Academy characterized Bal's approach to literary theory and the visual arts as "highly innovative, robust, and displaying extraordinary creativity."

Bal has supervised over eighty Ph.D. dissertations spanning a wide variety of topics, including the Ph.D. dissertation of new media scholar Lev Manovich at the University of Rochester in 1993.

Bal serves on the editorial board of academic journals including Parallax and Journal of Visual Culture, as well as on the international advisory board of Signs: Journal of Women in Culture and Society.

University of Chicago Press published A Mieke Bal Reader in 2006, while in 2008 John Wiley & Sons published About Mieke Bal, a collection of essays celebrating her work. Mieke Bal received an Honorary Doctorate from the University of Lucerne in 2016.

She is a member of the Norwegian Academy of Science and Letters.

== Personal life ==
Bal's daughter, Nanna Verhoeff, is also a scholar. She is a professor of media and performance studies in Utrecht University's Department of Media and Culture Studies.

== Major works ==
Bal has published more than thirty books on a wide range of subjects. Her research interests include biblical and classical antiquity, seventeenth-century and modern art, contemporary literature, feminism, mental illness, and migratory culture.

Bal's Narratology: Introduction to the Theory of Narrative (1985) is an introduction to the systematic study of narrative, in which she adopts structuralist concepts and terms as tools for the analysis of stories. A revised and expanded third edition was published in 2009.

Quoting Caravaggio: Contemporary Art, Preposterous History (1999) investigates how twentieth-century artists set up a dialogue with old-master art. Re-theorizing notions of linear influence and temporality, Bal introduces the concept of 'pre-posterous history' to help understand how modern quotations of Caravaggio renew our understanding of his work.

In Travelling Concepts in the Humanities: A Rough Guide (2002), Bal explores the deployment of concepts in interdisciplinary cultural analysis. In a series of case studies, Bal eschews more conventional methodologies based on a single paradigm or discipline in favor of an open re-examination of concepts as they 'travel' between disciplines, historical periods, and (cultural) contexts.

In 2013, Bal completed a trilogy of works on political art. Specifically, she seeks to understand how art can be politically effective without espousing particular political causes. In each of these books, she focuses on the oeuvre of an individual artist and their medium of choice. Of What One Cannot Speak (2010) examines the work of Colombian sculptor Doris Salcedo, Thinking in Film (2013) looks at the video installations of Finnish artist Eija-Liisa Ahtila, and Endless Andness (2013) engages with the abstract spatial interventions of Belgian artist Ann Veronica Janssens.

== Video work ==
In addition to her academic work, Bal is a video artist whose films and installations have been exhibited internationally. As a member of the film collective Cinema Suitcase, she made several videos that mostly revolve around issues of migration. With Michelle Williams Gamaker, she directed the feature-length film A Long History of Madness (2011). Based on the book Mère Folle by French psychoanalyst Françoise Davoine, the film is a so-called 'theoretical fiction' that examines how madness can be treated analytically. Bal and Williams Gamaker are currently completing their second feature film Madame B (2014), a modern interpretation of Gustave Flaubert's 1856 masterpiece Madame Bovary.

Between 2004 and 2005, Mieke Bal collaborated with artist Shahram Entekhabi to produce a series of videos on migration: Glub, Road Movie, Lost in Space, eye contact.

== Selected publications ==
- 1987. Lethal Love: Feminist Literary Readings of Biblical Love Stories. Bloomington and Indianapolis: Indiana University Press. ISBN 0-253-20434-8.
- 1988. Death and Dissymmetry: The Politics of Coherence in the Book of Judges. Chicago: University of Chicago Press. ISBN 0-226-03555-7.
- 1988. Murder and Difference: Gender, Genre and Scholarship on Sisera’s Death. Trans. Matthew Gumpert. Bloomington and Indianapolis: Indiana University Press. ISBN 0-253-33905-7.
- 1991. Reading “Rembrandt”: Beyond the Word–Image Opposition. Cambridge, UK, and New York: Cambridge University Press. ISBN 0-521-39154-7.
- 1996. Double Exposures: The Subject of Cultural Analysis. London and New York: Routledge. ISBN 0-415-91704-2.
- 1999. Quoting Caravaggio: Contemporary Art, Preposterous History. Chicago: University of Chicago Press. ISBN 0-226-03556-5.
- 2002. Travelling Concepts in the Humanities: A Rough Guide. Toronto: University of Toronto Press. ISBN 0-8020-8410-9.
- 2006. A Mieke Bal Reader. Chicago: University of Chicago Press. ISBN 0-226-03585-9.
- 2008. Loving Yusuf: Conceptual Travels from Present to Past. Chicago: University of Chicago Press. ISBN 0226035883.
- 2009 [1985]. Narratology: Introduction to the Theory of Narrative. 3rd ed. Trans. Christine van Boheemen. Toronto: University of Toronto Press. ISBN 978-0-8020-9631-9.
- 2010. Of What One Cannot Speak: Doris Salcedo’s Political Art. Chicago: University of Chicago Press. ISBN 0-226-03578-6.
- 2013. Endless Andness: The Politics of Abstraction According to Ann Veronica Janssens. London and New York: Bloomsbury. ISBN 978-1-4725-2818-6.
- 2013. Thinking in Film: The Politics of Video Installation According to Eija-Liisa Ahtila. London and New York: Bloomsbury. ISBN 978-1-4725-3274-9.
- 2022. Image-Thinking: Artmaking as Cultural Analysis. Edinburgh: Edinburgh University Press. ISBN 978-1-4744-9423-6.
