= Hypotext =

Earlier text; source of a subsequent piece of literature

Hypotext is an earlier text which serves as the source of a subsequent piece of literature, or hypertext. For example, Homer's Odyssey could be regarded as the hypotext for James Joyce's Ulysses.

The word was defined by the French theorist Gérard Genette as follows "Hypertextuality refers to any relationship uniting a text B (which I shall call the hypertext) to an earlier text A (I shall, of course, call it the hypotext), upon which it is grafted in a manner that is not that of commentary."

So, a hypertext derives from hypotext(s) through a process which Genette calls transformation, in which text B "evokes" text A without necessarily mentioning it directly. The hypertext may of course become original text in its own right.

The word has more recently been used in extended ways, for example, Adamczewski suggests that the Iliad was used as a structuring hypotext in Mark's Gospel.
