= Narrative =

Account that presents connected events

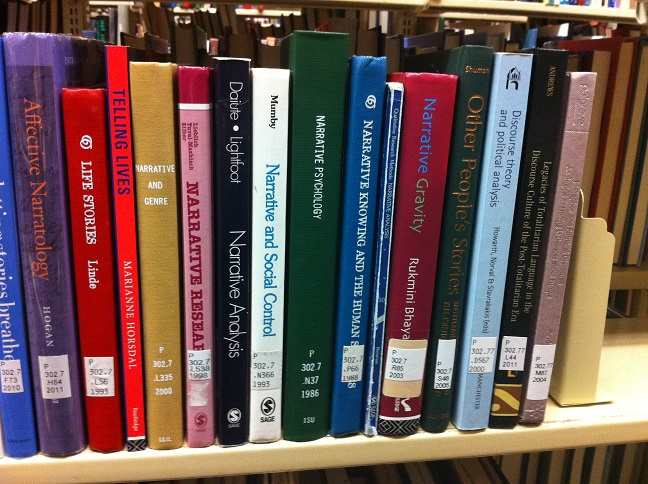
Books about narrative on a library shelf

A narrative, story, or tale is any account of a series of related events or experiences, whether non-fictional (memoir, biography, news report, documentary, travelogue, etc.) or fictional (fairy tale, fable, legend, thriller, novel, etc.). Narratives can be presented through a sequence of written or spoken words, through still or moving images, or through any combination of these.

Narrative is expressed in all mediums of human creativity, art, and entertainment, including speech (oral literature), literature, theatre, dance, music and song, comics, journalism, animation, video (including film and television), video games, radio, structured and unstructured recreation, and potentially even purely static visual art like painting, sculpture, drawing, and photography, as long as a sequence of events is presented.

The social and cultural activity of humans sharing narratives is called storytelling, the vast majority of which has taken the form of oral storytelling. Since the rise of literate societies however, many narratives have been additionally recorded, created, or otherwise passed down in written form. The formal and literary process of constructing a narrative — narration — is one of the four traditional rhetorical modes of discourse, along with argumentation, description, and exposition. This is a somewhat distinct usage from narration in the narrower sense of a commentary used to convey a story, alongside various additional narrative techniques used to build and enhance any given story.

The noun narration and adjective narrative entered English from French in the 15th century; narrative became usable as a noun in the following century. These words ultimately derive from the Latin verb narrare ("to tell"), itself derived from the adjective gnarus ("knowing or skilled").

== Overview ==
A narrative is the telling of some actual or fictitious sequence of connected events to an audience, by a narrator in some cases (and in all cases of written narratives). A personal narrative is any narrative in prose in which the speaker or writer presents, usually informally and in a spontaneous moment, their own personal experiences, such as in casual face-to-face conversation or in text messaging. Narratives are to be distinguished from simple descriptions of qualities, states, or situations without any particular individuals involved. Narratives range all the way from the shortest accounts of events (for example, the simple sentence "the cat sat on the mat" or a brief news item) to the most extended works, in the form of long and complex series that contain multiple books, films, television episodes, etc.

The topic of narrative can be organized into a number of thematic or formal categories. Nonfiction includes creative nonfiction, biography, journalism, historiography, and other storytelling forms grounded fully in facts and history. Fiction, however, departs from this complete basis in facts and history. For instance, fictionalization of historical events, such as myths, legends, works of historical fiction, and some anecdotes have a basis in past real-life events but add in imaginary or supernatural events or characters. Fiction in its other forms includes short stories, novels, most films, and imaginary narratives in other textual forms, games, or live or recorded performances. In the study of literary (written) fiction, it is usual to distinguish first-person from third-person narratives. Narrative poems and songs can be either fictional (like epics) or nonfictional (like transcript poems). Narrative poetry is distinct from lyric poetry, which focuses on the speaker's emotions and lacks a plot, setting, or other required elements. Furthermore, nearly all dramatic enactments (plays, musicals, operas, ballets, etc.) are narratives.

== Basic elements ==
Certain basic elements are necessary and sufficient to define all works of narrative, including, most well-studied, all fictional narrative works. Thus, scholars also commonly refer to the following essential elements of narrative as the elements of fiction.

=== Character ===
Characters are the individual persons inside a work of narrative; their choices and behaviors propel the plot forward. They typically are named humans whose actions and speech sometimes convey important motives. They may be entirely imaginary, they may be real-life individuals, or they may be roughly based on real-life individuals. The audience's first impressions are influential on how they perceive a fictional character, for example whether they empathize with a character or not, feeling for them as if they were real. The audience's familiarity with a character results in their expectations about how the character will behave in later scenes. Characters who behave contrary to their previous patterns of behavior (their characterization) can be confusing or jarring to the audience.

Narratives contain main characters, called protagonists, around whom the story revolves, who encounter a central conflict, or who gain knowledge or grow significantly across the story. (Some narratives performed by actors contain a collection of equally showcased protagonists, known as an ensemble cast.) Certain stories may also have antagonists: characters who oppose, hinder, or fight against the protagonist(s). In many traditional narratives, the protagonist is specifically a hero: a sympathetic person who battles (often literally) for morally good causes. The hero may face a villain: an antagonist who fights against morally good causes and actively perpetrates evil. Many other ways of classifying broad types of characters exist too, which are known as stock characters or character archetypes.

=== Conflict ===
Broadly speaking, conflict is any tension that drives the thoughts and actions of characters. Narrowly speaking, the conflict of a story is the major problem encountered by the protagonist(s). Often, a protagonist additionally struggles with a sense of anxiety, insecurity, indecisiveness, or other emotional burden as a result of this conflict, which can be regarded as a secondary or internal conflict. Longer works of narrative typically involve many conflicts or smaller-level conflicts that occur alongside a main one. Conflict can be classified into a variety of common types, with the major ones being: character versus character, character versus nature, character versus society, character versus unavoidable circumstances (often termed fate or destiny), and character versus self. If the conflict is brought to an end by the end of the story, this is known as a resolution.

=== Narrative mode ===
The narrative mode is the set of choices and techniques the author or creator selects in framing their story: how the narrative is told. It includes the scope of information presented or withheld, the type or style of language used, the channel or medium through which the story is presented, the way and extent to which narrative exposition and other types of commentary are communicated, and the overall point of view or perspective. An example of narrative perspective is a first-person narrative, in which some character (often the main one) refers openly to the self, using pronouns like "I" and "me", in communicating the story to the audience. Contrarily, in a third-person narrative, such pronouns are avoided in the telling of the story, perhaps because the teller is merely an impersonal written commentary of the story rather than a personal character within it. Both of these explicit tellings of a narrative through a spoken or written commentary are examples of a technique called narration, which is required only in written narratives but optional in other types. Though narration is a narrower term, it is occasionally used as a synonym for narrative mode in a very broad sense.

=== Plot ===
The plot is the sequence of events that occurs in a narrative from the beginning to the middle to the end. It typically occurs through a process of cause and effect, in which characters' actions or other events produce reactions that allow the story to progress. Put another way, plot is structured through a series of scenes in which related events occur that lead to subsequent scenes. These events form plot points, moments of change that affect the characters' understandings, decisions, and actions. The movement of the plot forward often corresponds to protagonists encountering or realizing the conflict, and then working to resolve it, creating emotional stakes for the characters as well as the audience. (The audience's anxious feeling of anticipation due to high emotional stakes is called suspense.) The process of storytellers structuring and ordering a narrative's events is known in academia as plotting or emplotment.

=== Setting ===
The setting is the time, place, and context in which a story takes place. It includes the physical and temporal surroundings that the characters inhabit and can also include the social or cultural conventions that affect characters. Sometimes, the setting may resemble a character in the sense that it has specific traits, undergoes actions that affect the plot, and develops over the course of the story.

=== Theme ===
Themes are the major underlying ideas presented by a story, generally left open to the audience's own interpretation. Themes are more abstract than other elements and are subjective: open to discussion by the audience who, by the story's end, can argue about which big ideas or messages were explored, what conclusions can be drawn, and which ones the work's creator intended. Thus, the audience may come to different conclusions about a work's themes than what the creator intended or regardless of what the creator intended. They can also develop new ideas about its themes as the work progresses.

== History ==
Stories are a defining component of human culture, predating recorded history. Written narratives survive from ancient civilizations, detailing for example the histories and mythologies of ancient Egyptian, Greek, Chinese, and Indian cultures. Storytelling, probably one of the earliest forms of entertainment, is a ubiquitous component of everyday human communication, also used as parables and examples to illustrate points, teach lessons, etc.

In India, archaeological evidence of the presence of stories is found at the Indus Valley Civilization site, Lothal. On one large vessel, the artist depicts birds with fish in their beaks resting in a tree, while a fox-like animal stands below. This scene bears resemblance to the story of The Fox and the Crow in the Panchatantra. On a miniature jar, the story of the thirsty crow and deer is depicted, of how the deer could not drink from the narrow mouth of the jar, while the crow succeeded by dropping stones into the jar. The features of the animals are clear and graceful.

== Narratology ==
The formal academic study of stories and storytelling is called narratology. Some theorists of narratology have attempted to isolate the quality or set of properties that distinguishes narrative from non-narrative writings: narrativity.

The strategies an author or other storyteller uses to build a story are called narrative techniques or narrative devices, a vast number of which scholars have identified. Examples of narrative techniques include having characters inside a story present another story: a nested narrative or story within a story. Another is the use of an unreliable narrator, a viewpoint character often found in certain genres like noir fiction, whose telling of the plot is presented suspiciously, in an unbelievable or doubtful way.

=== Human nature ===
Owen Flanagan of Duke University, a leading consciousness researcher, writes, "Evidence strongly suggests that humans in all cultures come to cast their own identity in some sort of narrative form. We are inveterate storytellers." Stories are an important aspect of culture. Many works of art and most works of literature tell stories; indeed, most of the humanities involve stories. As noted by Owen Flanagan, narrative may also refer to psychological processes in self-identity, memory, and meaning-making.

Semiotics begins with the individual building blocks of meaning called signs; semantics is the way in which signs are combined into codes to transmit messages. This is part of a general communication system using both verbal and non-verbal elements, and creating a discourse with different modalities and forms.

In On Realism in Art, Roman Jakobson attests that literature exists as a separate entity. He and many other semioticians prefer the view that all texts, whether spoken or written, are the same, except that some authors encode their texts with distinctive literary qualities that distinguish them from other forms of discourse. Nevertheless, there is a clear trend to address literary narrative forms as separable from other forms. This is first seen in Russian Formalism through Victor Shklovsky's analysis of the relationship between composition and style, and in the work of Vladimir Propp, who analyzed the plots used in traditional folk-tales and identified 31 distinct functional components. This trend (or these trends) continued in the work of the Prague School and of French scholars such as Claude Lévi-Strauss and Roland Barthes. It leads to a structural analysis of narrative and an increasingly influential body of modern work that raises important theoretical questions:

- What is text?
- What is its role (culture)?
- How is it manifested as art, cinema, theater, or literature?
- Why is narrative divided into different genres, such as poetry, short stories, and novels?

=== Literary theory ===
In literary theoretic approach, narrative is being narrowly defined as fiction-writing mode in which the narrator is communicating directly to the reader. Until the late 19th century, literary criticism as an academic exercise dealt solely with poetry (including epic poems like the Iliad and Paradise Lost, and poetic drama like Shakespeare). Most poems did not have a narrator distinct from the author.

But novels, lending a number of voices to several characters in addition to narrator's, created a possibility of narrator's views differing significantly from the author's views. With the rise of the novel in the 18th century, the concept of the narrator (as opposed to "author") made the question of narrator a prominent one for literary theory. It has been proposed that perspective and interpretive knowledge are the essential characteristics, while focalization and structure are lateral characteristics of the narrator.

The role of literary theory in narrative has been disputed; with some interpretations like Todorov's narrative model that views all narratives in a cyclical manner, and that each narrative is characterized by a three part structure that allows the narrative to progress. The beginning stage being an establishment of equilibrium—a state of non conflict, followed by a disruption to this state, caused by an external event, and lastly a restoration or a return to equilibrium—a conclusion that brings the narrative back to a similar space before the events of the narrative unfolded.

The school of literary criticism known as Russian formalism has applied methods that are more often used to analyse narrative fiction, to non-fictional texts such as political speeches.

Other critiques of literary theory in narrative challenge the very role of literariness in narrative, as well as the role of narrative in literature. Meaning, narratives, and their associated aesthetics, emotions, and values have the ability to operate without the presence of literature, and vice versa. According to Didier Costa, the structural model used by Todorov and others is unfairly biased toward a Western interpretation of narrative, and that a more comprehensive and transformative model must be created in order to properly analyze narrative discourse in literature. Framing also plays a pivotal role in narrative structure; an analysis of the historical and cultural contexts present during the development of a narrative is needed in order to more accurately represent the role of narratology in societies that relied heavily on oral narratives.

=== Aesthetics approach ===
Narrative is a highly aesthetic art. Thoughtfully composed stories have a number of aesthetic elements. Such elements include the idea of narrative structure, with identifiable beginnings, middles, and ends, or the process of exposition-development-climax-denouement, with coherent plot lines; a strong focus on temporality including retention of the past, attention to present action, and future anticipation; a substantial focus on character and characterization, "arguably the most important single component of the novel" (David Lodge The Art of Fiction 67); different voices interacting, "the sound of the human voice, or many voices, speaking in a variety of accents, rhythms, and registers" (Lodge The Art of Fiction 97; see also the theory of Mikhail Bakhtin for expansion of this idea); a narrator or narrator-like voice, which "addresses" and "interacts with" reading audiences (see Reader Response theory); communicates with a Wayne Booth-esque rhetorical thrust, a dialectic process of interpretation, which is at times beneath the surface, forming a plotted narrative, and at other times much more visible, "arguing" for and against various positions; relies substantially on the use of literary tropes (see Hayden White, Metahistory for expansion of this idea); is often intertextual with other literatures; and commonly demonstrates an effort toward Bildungsroman, a description of identity development with an effort to evince becoming in character and community.

=== Psychological approach ===
Within philosophy of mind, the social sciences, and various clinical fields including medicine, narrative can refer to aspects of human psychology. A personal narrative process is involved in a person's sense of personal or cultural identity, and in the creation and construction of memories; it is thought by some to be the fundamental nature of the self. The breakdown of a coherent or positive narrative has been implicated in the development of psychosis and mental disorders, and its repair said to play an important role in journeys of recovery. Narrative therapy is a form of psychotherapy.

Illness narratives are a way for a person affected by an illness to make sense of his or her experiences. They typically follow one of several set patterns: restitution, chaos, or quest narratives. In the restitution narrative, the person sees the illness as a temporary detour. The primary goal is to return permanently to normal life and normal health. These may also be called cure narratives. In the chaos narrative, the person sees the illness as a permanent state that will inexorably get worse, with no redeeming virtues. This is typical of diseases like Alzheimer's disease: the patient gets worse and worse, and there is no hope of returning to normal life. The third major type, the quest narrative, positions the illness experience as an opportunity to transform oneself into a better person through overcoming adversity and re-learning what is most important in life; the physical outcome of the illness is less important than the spiritual and psychological transformation. This is typical of the triumphant view of cancer survivorship in the breast cancer culture. Survivors may be expected to articulate a wisdom narrative, in which they explain to others a new and better view of the meaning of life.

Personality traits, more specifically the Big Five personality traits, appear to be associated with the type of language or patterns of word use found in an individual's self-narrative. In other words, language use in self-narratives accurately reflects human personality. The linguistic correlates of each Big Five trait are as follows:

- Extraversion - positively correlated with words referring to humans, social processes, and family;
- Agreeableness - positively correlated with family, inclusiveness, and certainty; negatively correlated with anger and body (that is, few negative comments about health or body);
- Conscientiousness - positively correlated with achievement and work; negatively related to body, death, anger, and exclusiveness;
- Neuroticism - positively correlated with sadness, negative emotion, body, anger, home, and anxiety; negatively correlated with work;
- Openness - positively correlated with perceptual processes, hearing, and exclusiveness

=== Social-sciences approaches ===
Human beings often claim to understand events when they manage to formulate a coherent story or narrative explaining how they believe the event was generated. Narratives thus lie at the foundations of our cognitive procedures and also provide an explanatory framework for the social sciences, particularly when it is difficult to assemble enough cases to permit statistical analysis. Narrative is often used in case study research in the social sciences. Here it has been found that the dense, contextual, and interpenetrating nature of social forces uncovered by detailed narratives is often more interesting and useful for both social theory and social policy than other forms of social inquiry. Research using narrative methods in the social sciences has been described as still being in its infancy but this perspective has several advantages such as access to an existing, rich vocabulary of analytical terms: plot, genre, subtext, epic, hero/heroine, story arc (e.g., beginning–middle–end), and so on. Another benefit is it emphasizes that even apparently non-fictional documents (speeches, policies, legislation) are still fictions, in the sense they are authored and usually have an intended audience in mind.

Sociologists Jaber F. Gubrium and James A. Holstein have contributed to the formation of a constructionist approach to narrative in sociology. From their book The Self We Live By: Narrative Identity in a Postmodern World (2000), to more recent texts such as Analyzing Narrative Reality (2009) and Varieties of Narrative Analysis (2012), they have developed an analytic framework for researching stories and storytelling that is centered on the interplay of institutional discourses (big stories) on the one hand, and everyday accounts (little stories) on the other. The goal is the sociological understanding of formal and lived texts of experience, featuring the production, practices, and communication of accounts.

==== Inquiry approach ====
In order to avoid "hardened stories", or "narratives that become context-free, portable, and ready to be used anywhere and anytime for illustrative purposes" and are being used as conceptual metaphors as defined by linguist George Lakoff, an approach called narrative inquiry was proposed, resting on the epistemological assumption that human beings make sense of random or complex multicausal experience by the imposition of story structures. Human propensity to simplify data through a predilection for narratives over complex data sets can lead to the narrative fallacy. It is easier for the human mind to remember and make decisions on the basis of stories with meaning, than to remember strings of data. This is one reason why narratives are so powerful and why many of the classics in the humanities and social sciences are written in the narrative format. But humans can read meaning into data and compose stories, even where this is unwarranted. Some scholars suggest that the narrative fallacy and other biases can be avoided by applying standard methodical checks for validity (statistics) and reliability (statistics) in terms of how data (narratives) are collected, analyzed, and presented. More typically, scholars working with narrative prefer to use other evaluative criteria (such as believability or perhaps interpretive validity) since they do not see statistical validity as meaningfully applicable to qualitative data: "the concepts of validity and reliability, as understood from the positivist perspective, are somehow inappropriate and inadequate when applied to interpretive research". Several criteria for assessing the validity of narrative research was proposed, including the objective aspect, the emotional aspect, the social/moral aspect, and the clarity of the story.

=== Mathematical-sociology approach ===
In mathematical sociology, the theory of comparative narratives was devised in order to describe and compare the structures (expressed as "and" in a directed graph where multiple causal links incident into a node are conjoined) of action-driven sequential events.

Narratives so conceived comprise the following ingredients:

- A finite set of state descriptions of the world S, the components of which are weakly ordered in time;
- A finite set of actors/agents (individual or collective), P;
- A finite set of actions A;
- A mapping of P onto A;

The structure (directed graph) is generated by letting the nodes stand for the states and the directed edges represent how the states are changed by specified actions. The action skeleton can then be abstracted, comprising a further digraph where the actions are depicted as nodes and edges take the form "action a co-determined (in context of other actions) action b".

Narratives can be both abstracted and generalised by imposing an algebra upon their structures and thence defining homomorphism between the algebras. The insertion of action-driven causal links in a narrative can be achieved using the method of Bayesian narratives.

==== Bayesian narratives ====
Developed by Peter Abell, the theory of Bayesian narratives conceives a narrative as a directed graph comprising multiple causal links (social interactions) of the general form: "action a causes action b in a specified context". In the absence of sufficient comparative cases to enable statistical treatment of the causal links, items of evidence in support and against a particular causal link are assembled and used to compute the Bayesian likelihood ratio of the link. Subjective causal statements of the form "I did b because of a" and subjective counterfactuals "if it had not been for a I would not have done b" are notable items of evidence.

== In music ==
Linearity is one of several narrative qualities that can be found in a musical composition. As noted by American musicologist Edward Cone, narrative terms are also present in the analytical language about music. The different components of a fugue — subject, answer, exposition, discussion, and summary — can be cited as an example. However, there are several views on the concept of narrative in music and the role it plays. One theory is that of Theodore Adorno, who has suggested that "music recites itself, is its own context, narrates without narrative". Another, is that of Carolyn Abbate, who has suggested that "certain gestures experienced in music constitute a narrating voice". Still others have argued that narrative is a semiotic enterprise that can enrich musical analysis. The French musicologist Jean-Jacques Nattiez contends that "the narrative, strictly speaking, is not in the music, but in the plot imagined and constructed by the listeners". He argues that discussing music in terms of narrativity is simply metaphorical and that the "imagined plot" may be influenced by the work's title or other programmatic information provided by the composer. However, Abbate has revealed numerous examples of musical devices that function as narrative voices, by limiting music's ability to narrate to rare "moments that can be identified by their bizarre and disruptive effect". Various theorists share this view of narrative appearing in disruptive rather than normative moments in music. The final word is yet to be said regarding narratives in music, as there is still much to be determined.

== In film ==
Unlike most forms of narratives that are inherently language based (whether that be narratives presented in literature or orally), film narratives face additional challenges in creating a cohesive narrative. Whereas the general assumption in literary theory is that a narrator must be present in order to develop a narrative, as Schmid proposes; the act of an author writing his or her words in text is what communicates to the audience (in this case readers) the narrative of the text, and the author represents an act of narrative communication between the textual narrator and the narratee. This is in line with Fludernik's perspective on what's called cognitive narratology—which states that a literary text has the ability to manifest itself into an imagined, representational illusion that the reader will create for themselves, and can vary greatly from reader to reader. In other words, the scenarios of a literary text (referring to settings, frames, schemes, etc.) are going to be represented differently for each individual reader based on a multiplicity of factors, including the reader's own personal life experiences that allow them to comprehend the literary text in a distinct manner from anyone else.

Film narrative does not have the luxury of having a textual narrator that guides its audience toward a formative narrative; nor does it have the ability to allow its audience to visually manifest the contents of its narrative in a unique fashion like literature does. Instead, film narratives utilize visual and auditory devices in substitution for a narrative subject; these devices include cinematography, editing, sound design (both diegetic and non-diegetic sound), as well as the arrangement and decisions on how and where the subjects are located onscreen—known as mise-en-scène. These cinematic devices, among others, contribute to the unique blend of visual and auditory storytelling that culminates to what Jose Landa refers to as a "visual narrative instance". And unlike narratives found in other performance arts such as plays and musicals, film narratives are not bound to a specific place and time, and are not limited by scene transitions in plays, which are restricted by set design and allotted time.

== In mythology ==
The nature or existence of a formative narrative in many of the world's myths, folktales, and legends has been a topic of debate for many modern scholars; but the most common consensus among academics is that throughout most cultures, traditional mythologies and folklore tales are constructed and retold with a specific narrative purpose that serves to offer a society an understandable explanation of natural phenomena—oftentimes absent of a verifiable author. These explanatory tales manifest themselves in various forms and serve different societal functions, including life lessons for individuals to learn from (for example, the Ancient Greek tale of Icarus refusing to listen to his elders and flying too close to the sun), explaining forces of nature or other natural phenomena (for example, the flood myth that spans cultures all over the world), and providing an understanding of human nature, as exemplified by the myth of Cupid and Psyche.

Considering how mythologies have historically been transmitted and passed down through oral retellings, there is no qualitative or reliable method to precisely trace exactly where and when a tale originated; and since myths are rooted in a remote past, and are viewed as a factual account of happenings within the culture it originated from, the worldview present in many oral mythologies is from a cosmological perspective—one that is told from a voice that has no physical embodiment, and is passed down and modified from generation to generation. This cosmological worldview in myth is what provides all mythological narratives credence, and since they are easily communicated and modified through oral tradition among various cultures, they help solidify the cultural identity of a civilization and contribute to the notion of a collective human consciousness that continues to help shape one's own understanding of the world.

Myth is often used in an overarching sense to describe a multitude of folklore genres, but there is a significance in distinguishing the various forms of folklore in order to properly determine what narratives constitute as mythological, as anthropologist Sir James Frazer suggests. Frazer contends that there are three primary categories of mythology (now more broadly considered categories of folklore): Myths, legends, and folktales, and that by definition, each genre pulls its narrative from a different ontological source, and therefore has different implications within a civilization. Frazer states:

"If these definitions be accepted, we may say that myth has its source in reason, legend in memory, and folk-tale in imagination; and that the three riper products of the human mind which correspond to these its crude creations are science, history, and romance."

Janet Bacon expanded upon Frazer's categorization in her 1921 publication—The Voyage of The Argonauts.

1. Myth – According to Janet Bacon's 1921 publication, "Myth has an explanatory intention. It explains some natural phenomenon whose causes are not obvious, or some ritual practice whose origin has been forgotten." Bacon views myths as narratives that serve a practical societal function of providing a satisfactory explanation for many of humanity's greatest questions. Those questions address topics such as astronomical events, historical circumstances, environmental phenomena, and a range of human experiences including love, anger, greed, and isolation.
2. Legend – According to Bacon, "Legend, on the other hand, is true tradition founded on the fortunes of real people or on adventures at real places. Agamemnon, Lycurgus, Coriolanus, King Arthur, Saladin, are real people whose fame and the legends which spread it have become world-wide." Legends are mythical figures whose accomplishments and accolades live beyond their own mortality and transcend to the realm of myth by way of verbal communication through the ages. Like myth, they are rooted in the past, but unlike the sacred ephemeral space in which myths occur, legends are often individuals of human flesh that lived here on earth long ago, and are believed as fact. In American folklore, the tale of Davy Crockett or debatably Paul Bunyan can be considered legends—they were real people who lived in the world, but through the years of regional folktales have assumed a mythological quality.
3. Folktale – Bacon classifies folktale as such, "Folk-tale, however, calls for no belief, being wholly the product of the imagination. In far distant ages some inventive story-teller was pleased to pass an idle hour with stories told of many-a-feat." Bacon's definition assumes that folktales do not possess the same underlying factualness that myths and legends tend to have. While folktales still hold a considerable cultural value, they are simply not regarded as true within a civilization. Bacon says, like myths, folktales are imagined and created by someone at some point, but differ in that folktales' primary purpose is to entertain; and that like legends, folktales may possess some element of truth in their original conception, but lack any form of credibility found in legends.

=== Mythic structure ===
In the absence of a known author or original narrator, myth narratives are oftentimes referred to as prose narratives. Prose narratives tend to be relatively linear regarding the time period they occur in, and are traditionally marked by its natural flow of speech as opposed to the rhythmic structure found in various forms of literature such as poetry and haikus. The structure of prose narratives allows it to be easily understood by many—as the narrative generally starts at the beginning of the story, and ends when the protagonist has resolved the conflict. These kinds of narratives are generally accepted as true within society, and are told from a place of great reverence and sacredness. Myths are believed to occur in a remote past—one that is before the creation or establishment of the civilization they derive from, and are intended to provide an account for things such as humanity's origins, natural phenomenon, and human nature. Thematically, myths seek to provide information about oneself, and many are viewed as among some of the oldest forms of prose narratives, which grants traditional myths their life-defining characteristics that continue to be communicated today.

Another theory regarding the purpose and function of mythological narratives derives from 20th Century philologist Georges Dumézil and his formative theory of the "trifunctionalism" found in Indo-European mythologies. Dumèzil refers only to the myths found in Indo-European societies, but the primary assertion made by his theory is that Indo-European life was structured around the notion of three distinct and necessary societal functions, and as a result, the various gods and goddesses in Indo-European mythology assumed these functions as well. The three functions were organized by cultural significance, with the first function being the most grand and sacred. For Dumèzil, these functions were so vital, they manifested themselves in every aspect of life and were at the center of everyday life.

These "functions", as Dumèzil puts it, were an array of esoteric knowledge and wisdom that was reflected by the mythology. The first function was sovereignty—and was divided into two additional categories: magical and juridical. As each function in Dumèzil's theory corresponded to a designated social class in the human realm; the first function was the highest, and was reserved for the status of kings and other royalty. In an interview with Alain Benoist, Dumèzil described magical sovereignty as such,

"[Magical Sovereignty] consists of the mysterious administration, the 'magic' of the universe, the general ordering of the cosmos. This is a 'disquieting' aspect, terrifying from certain perspectives. The other aspect is more reassuring, more oriented to the human world. It is the 'juridical' part of the sovereign function."

This implies that gods of the first function are responsible for the overall structure and order of the universe, and those gods who possess juridical sovereignty are more closely connected to the realm of humans and are responsible for the concept of justice and order. Dumèzil uses the pantheon of Norse gods as examples of these functions in his 1981 essay—he finds that the Norse gods Odin and Tyr reflect the different brands of sovereignty. Odin is the author of the cosmos, and possessor of infinite esoteric knowledge—going so far as to sacrifice his eye for the accumulation of more knowledge. While Tyr—seen as the "just god"—is more concerned with upholding justice, as illustrated by the epic myth of Tyr losing his hand in exchange for the monster Fenrir to cease his terrorization of the gods. Dumèzil's theory suggests that through these myths, concepts of universal wisdom and justice were able to be communicated to the Nordic people in the form of a mythological narrative.

The second function as described by Dumèzil is that of the proverbial hero or champion. These myths functioned to convey the themes of heroism, strength, and bravery and were most often represented in both the human world and the mythological world by valiant warriors. While the gods of the second function were still revered in society, they did not possess the same infinite knowledge found in the first category. A Norse god that would fall under the second function would be Thor—god of thunder. Thor possessed great strength, and was often first into battle, as ordered by his father Odin. This second function reflects Indo-European cultures' high regard for the warrior class, and explains the belief in an afterlife that rewards a valiant death on the battlefield; for the Norse mythology, this is represented by Valhalla.

Lastly, Dumèzil's third function is composed of gods that reflect the nature and values of the most common people in Indo-European life. These gods often presided over the realms of healing, prosperity, fertility, wealth, luxury, and youth—any kind of function that was easily related to by the common peasant farmer in a society. Just as a farmer would live and sustain themselves off their land, the gods of the third function were responsible for the prosperity of their crops, and were also in charge of other forms of everyday life that would never be observed by the status of kings and warriors, such as mischievousness and promiscuity. An example found in Norse mythology could be seen through the god Freyr—a god who was closely connected to acts of debauchery and overindulging.

Dumèzil viewed his theory of trifunctionalism as distinct from other mythological theories because of the way the narratives of Indo-European mythology permeated into every aspect of life within these societies, to the point that the societal view of death shifted away from a primal perception that tells one to fear death, and instead death became seen as the penultimate act of heroism—by solidifying a person's position in the hall of the gods when they pass from this realm to the next. Additionally, Dumèzil proposed that his theory stood at the foundation of the modern understanding of the Christian Trinity, citing that the three key deities of Odin, Thor, and Freyr were often depicted together in a trio—seen by many as an overarching representation of what would be known today as "divinity".

== In cultural storytelling ==
A narrative gives listeners an entertaining and collaborative avenue for acquiring knowledge. All human cultures use storytelling as a way to record their histories, myths, and values, with the oldest and majority form being oral storytelling. These stories can be seen as evolving entities among cultural communities that carry the shared experience and history of the culture within them.

While storytelling is often a form of entertainment and recreation, it can also be instructional or educational. During people's childhoods, narratives are often used to guide them on: proper behavior, history, formation of a communal identity, and values from their culture's standpoint, which anthropologists explicitly study today, for instance, in the communities of indigenous people. With regard to oral tradition, narratives consist of everyday speech where the performer has the licence to recontextualise the story to a particular audience, often to a younger generation, and are contrasted with epics which consist of formal speech and are usually learned word for word.

Stories are often used within indigenous cultures in order to share knowledge to the younger generation. Due to indigenous narratives leaving room for open-ended interpretation, native stories often engage children in the storytelling process so that they can make their own meaning and explanations within the story. This promotes holistic thinking among native children, which works toward merging an individual and world identity. Such an identity upholds native epistemology and gives children a sense of belonging as their cultural identity develops through the sharing and passing on of stories.

For example, a number of indigenous stories are used to illustrate a value or lesson. In the Western Apache tribe, stories can be used to warn of the misfortune that befalls people when they do not follow acceptable behavior. One story speaks to the offense of a mother's meddling in her married son's life. In the story, the Western Apache tribe is under attack from a neighboring tribe, the Pimas. The Apache mother hears a scream. Thinking it is her son's wife screaming, she tries to intervene by yelling at him. This alerts the Pima tribe to her location, and she is promptly killed due to intervening in her son's life.

Indigenous American cultures use storytelling to teach children the values and lessons of life. Although storytelling provides entertainment, its primary purpose is to educate. Alaskan Indigenous Natives state that narratives teach children where they fit in, what their society expects of them, how to create a peaceful living environment, and to be responsible, worthy members of their communities. In the Mexican culture, many adult figures tell their children stories in order to teach children values such as individuality, obedience, honesty, trust, and compassion. For example, one of the versions of La Llorona is used to teach children to make safe decisions at night and to maintain the morals of the community.

Narratives are considered by the Canadian Métis community, to help children understand that the world around them is interconnected to their lives and communities. For example, the Métis community share the "Humorous Horse Story" to children, which portrays that horses stumble throughout life just like humans do. Navajo stories also use dead animals as metaphors by showing that all things have purpose. Lastly, elders from Alaskan Native communities claim that the use of animals as metaphors allow children to form their own perspectives while at the same time self-reflecting on their own lives.

American Indian elders also state that storytelling invites the listeners, especially children, to draw their own conclusions and perspectives while self-reflecting upon their lives. Furthermore, they insist that narratives help children grasp and obtain a wide range of perspectives that help them interpret their lives in the context of the story. American Indian community members emphasize to children that the method of obtaining knowledge can be found in stories passed down through each generation. Moreover, community members also let the children interpret and build a different perspective of each story.

== In the military ==
An emerging field of information warfare (see also Hybrid warfare) is the "battle of the narratives". The battle of the narratives is a full-blown battle in the cognitive dimension of the information environment, just as traditional warfare is fought in the physical domains (air, land, sea, space, and cyberspace). One of the foundational struggles in warfare in the physical domains is to shape the environment such that the contest of arms will be fought on terms that are to one's advantage. Likewise, a key component of the battle of the narratives is to succeed in establishing the reasons for and potential outcomes of the conflict, on terms favorable to one's efforts.

== Historiography ==
In historiography, according to Lawrence Stone, narrative has traditionally been the main rhetorical device used by historians. In 1979, at a time when the new social history was demanding a social-science model of analysis, Stone detected a move back toward the narrative. Stone defined narrative as organized chronologically; focused on a single coherent story; descriptive rather than analytical; concerned with people not abstract circumstances; and dealing with the particular and specific rather than the collective and statistical. He reported that, "More and more of the 'new historians' are now trying to discover what was going on inside people's heads in the past, and what it was like to live in the past, questions which inevitably lead back to the use of narrative."

Some philosophers identify narratives with a type of explanation. Mark Bevir argues, for example, that narratives explain actions by appealing to the beliefs and desires of actors and by locating webs of beliefs in the context of historical traditions. Narrative is an alternative form of explanation to that associated with natural science.

Historians committed to a social science approach, however, have criticized the narrowness of narrative and its preference for anecdote over analysis, and clever examples rather than statistical regularities.

== Storytelling rights ==
Storytelling rights may be broadly defined as the ethics of sharing narratives (including—but not limited to—firsthand, secondhand, and imagined stories). In Storytelling Rights: The uses of oral and written texts by urban adolescents, author Amy Shuman offers the following definition of storytelling rights: "the important and precarious relationship between narrative and event and, specifically, between the participants in an event and the reporters who claim the right to talk about what happened."

The ethics of retelling other people's stories may be explored through a number of questions: whose story is being told and how, what is the story's purpose or aim, what does the story promise (for instance, empathy, redemption, authenticity, clarification)—and at whose benefit? Storytelling rights also implicates questions of consent, empathy, and accurate representation. While storytelling—and retelling—can function as a powerful tool for agency and advocacy, it can also lead to misunderstanding and exploitation.

Storytelling rights is notably important in the genre of personal experience narrative. Academic disciplines such as performance, folklore, literature, anthropology, cultural studies, and other social sciences may involve the study of storytelling rights, often hinging on ethics.

== Other specific applications ==
- Narrative environment is a contested term that has been used for techniques of architectural or exhibition design in which 'stories are told in space' and also for the virtual environments in which computer games are played and which are invented by the computer game authors.
- Narrative film usually uses images and sounds on film (or, more recently, on analogue or digital video media) to convey a story. Narrative film is usually thought of in terms of fiction but it may also assemble stories from filmed reality, as in some documentary film, but narrative film may also use animation.
- Narrative history is a genre of factual historical writing that uses chronology as its framework (as opposed to a thematic treatment of a historical subject).
- Narrative photography is photography used to tell stories or in conjunction with stories.
- Narrative poetry is poetry that tells a story.
- Narrative-based learning uses stories to teach concepts and communicate ideas.
- Metanarrative, sometimes also known as master- or grand narrative, is a higher-level cultural narrative schema which orders and explains knowledge and experience you've had in life. Similar to metanarrative are masterplots or "recurrent skeletal stories, belonging to cultures and individuals that play a powerful role in questions of identity, values, and the understanding of life."

== See also ==
- Hypodiegetic narrative
- Monogatari
- Narrative designer
- Narrative thread
- Narreme as the basic unit of narrative structure
- Organizational storytelling
