= Nidaba (crater) =

Crater on Ganymede

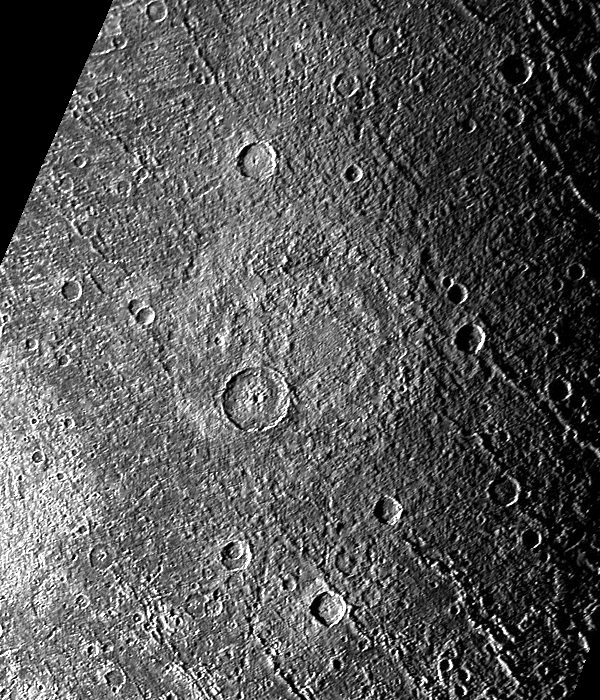
- An image of Nidaba, taken by Voyager 2 on 9 July 1979.
- Feature type: Penepalimpsest
- Coordinates: 17.75°N 123.43°W
- Diameter: 199 kilometres (124 mi)
- Eponym: Nidaba

Nidaba is a penepalimpsest, an ancient crater in the process of disappearing, on Ganymede, the largest moon of the planet Jupiter. The penepalimpsest is approximately 199 kilometres (124 mi) wide, and a smaller, younger, and better-preserved crater lies within it.

== Naming ==
Nidaba is named after the Sumerian goddess of grains, cereals, and reeds, Nidaba (or Nisaba). As reeds were once used as writing tools, she was also associated with accounting and writing.

Nidaba's name follows the naming convention established by the IAU, which specifies that craters on Ganymede should be named after deities, heroes, or places from Ancient Middle Eastern mythology. Sumerian mythology traditionally falls within this category.

The IAU approved the name for Nidaba in 1985.

== Location ==
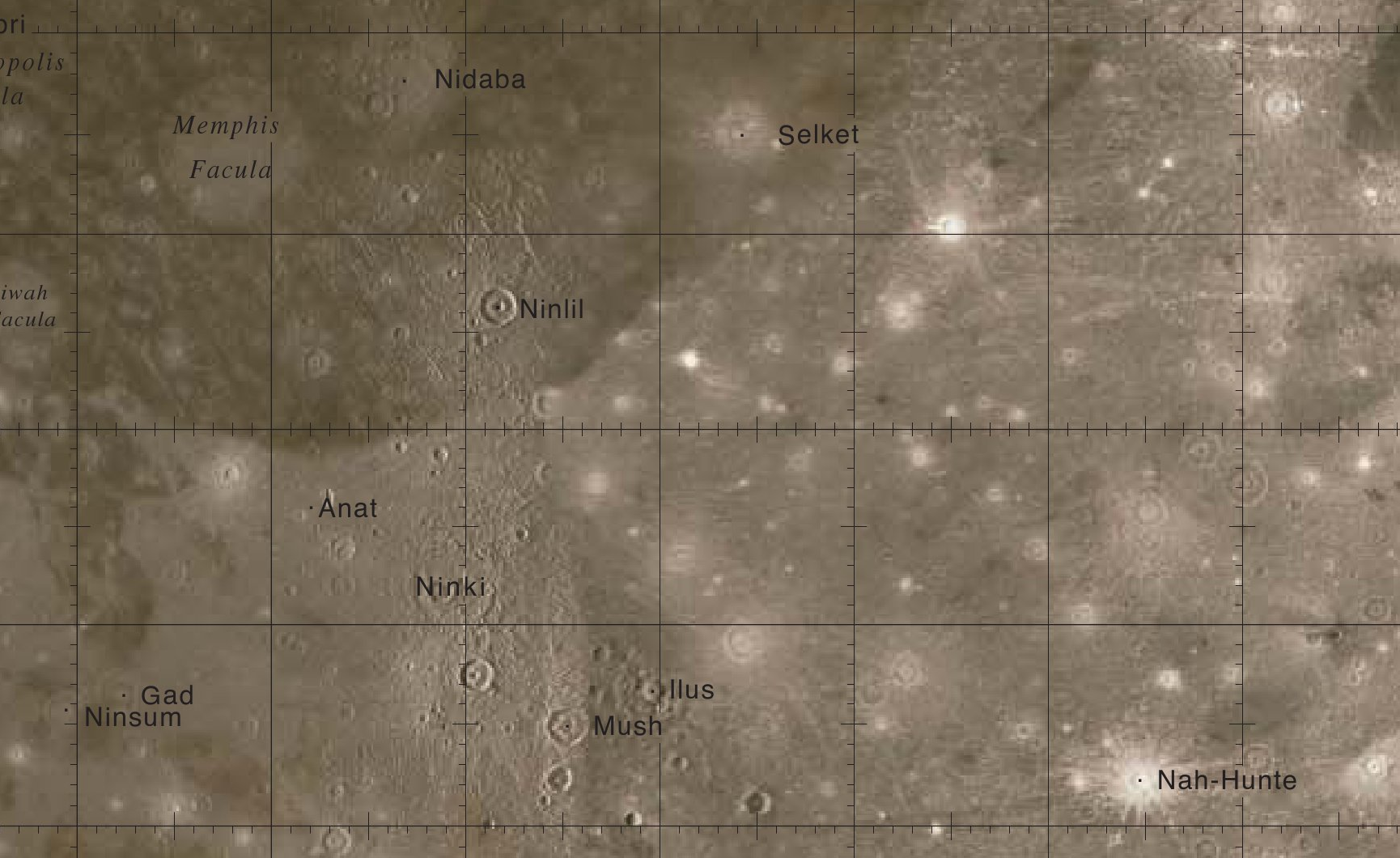
The Memphis Facula quadrangle where the Nidaba is located.

Nidaba is located in the southwestern section of the dark, ancient region on Ganymede known as Galileo Regio. The area around Nidaba is densely packed with craters, palimpsests (or ghost craters), and other possible penepalimpsests, reflecting the region's ancientness.

To the west of Nidaba is the wide palimpsest Memphis Facula and one of the most well-studied ghost craters in the Solar System. To the east lies the bright-floor crater Selket, while to the southwest is the more well-preserved pit crater Ninlil.

Nidaba is located within the Memphis Facula quadrangle of Ganymede (designated Jg7), which is named after the ghost crater near Nidaba.

Nidaba is situated on the hemisphere of Ganymede that never faces Jupiter. This is because the moon is synchronously rotating as it orbits around its parent planet. Therefore, if an observer were to stand on Nidiba, they would never see Jupiter in the sky. (Note: For moons in synchronous rotation, such as Ganymede, 0° longitude corresponds to the part of the surface that always faces Jupiter. Regions between 90° W and 270° W longitude never face the moon's parent planet.)

== Age and geology ==
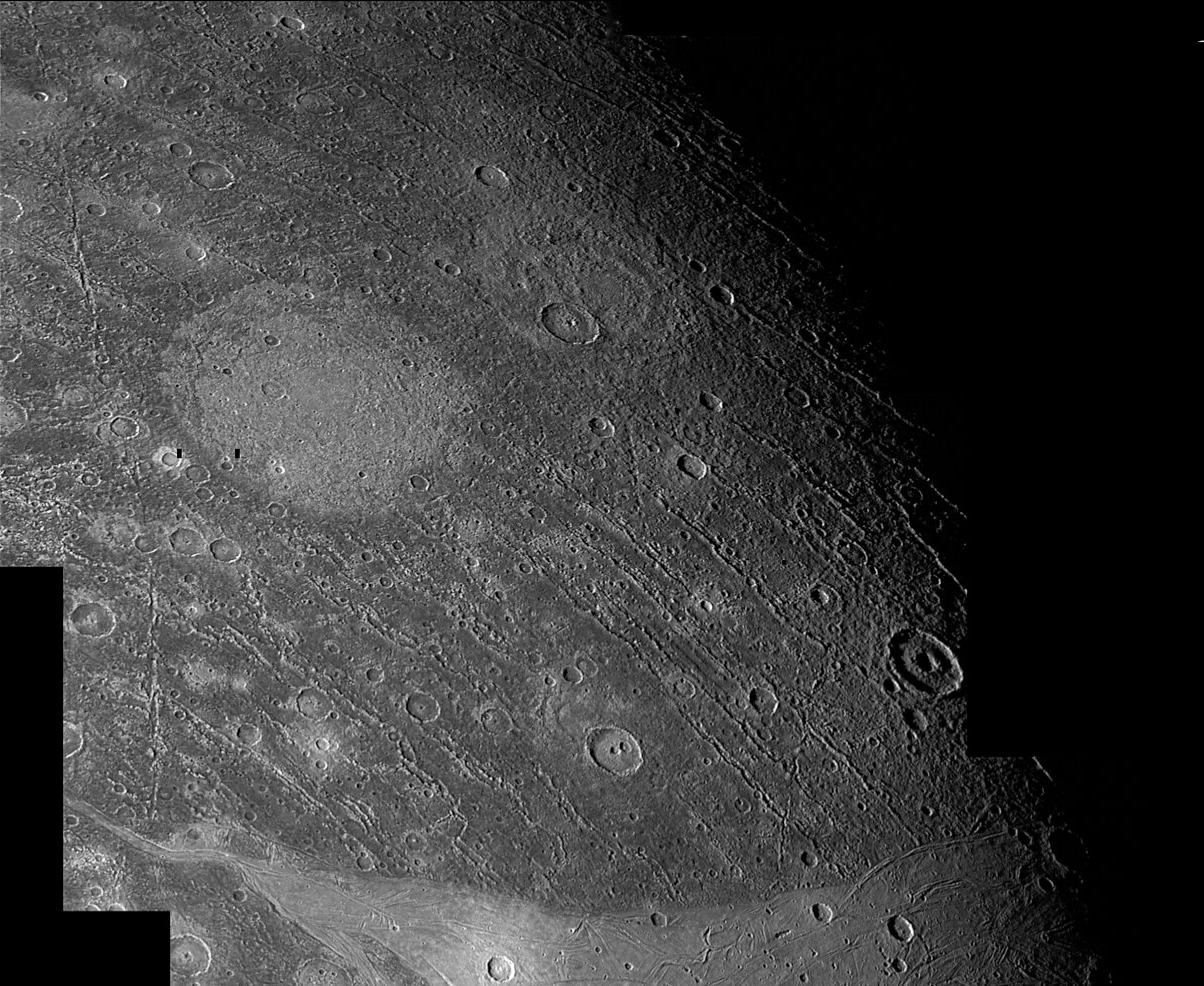
An image of the southwestern section of Galileo Regio, showing Nidaba (slightly above the center), taken by Voyager 2 in July 1979. The bright spot to the west of Nidaba is Memphis Facula.

Nidiba is often called a penepalimpsest, an ancient crater that is on the verge of becoming a palimpsest (or ghost crater) and ultimately disappearing. The distinction between palimpsests and penepalimpsests is not always well defined, and the two are sometimes classified as the same type of structure. As a penepalimpsest, Nidiba still displays more well-defined and well-developed concentric ridges and hills than its more ghostly palimpsest counterparts, such as Memphis Facula and Buto Facula.

Within Nidaba is a more recent, better-preserved pit crater, but it has not yet received a formal name.

== Process of Crater Erasure ==
It is generally believed that there are two main reasons why craters on Ganymede tend to disappear over time. The first is Ganymede's relatively slow tectonic activity, which gradually erodes and erases surface craters. As fresh water ice erupts from beneath Ganymede's surface, it overprints older terrain and obscures ancient surface features, including dark regions such as Galileo Regio and older impact craters such as Nidiba.

The second process believed to erase craters is viscous relaxation. Because Ganymede's surface is composed largely of ice, it slowly flows over time, causing crater floors to rise isostatically while crater rims slump. Eventually, a crater may become barely visible — like in the case of the crater Zakar — before disappearing entirely.

The majority of viscously relaxed craters are found within Ganymede's dark terrain, and Nidaba may be one of them.

== Exploration ==
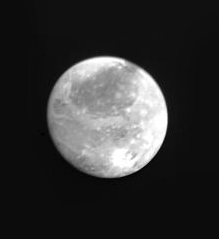
A distant image of Ganymede, taken by Voyager 1 in February 1979. Nidaba is the bright spot slightly above and to the right of the center.

Voyager 1 became the first probe to return useable images of Ganymede. During its approach to Ganymede in February 1979, it was able to image Nidaba, but the spacecraft was still several million kilometers away from the moon, limiting the resolution of the images. By the time of Voyager 1's closest approach to Ganymede on 5 March 1979, Nidaba had already rotated onto the moon's unilluminated night side.

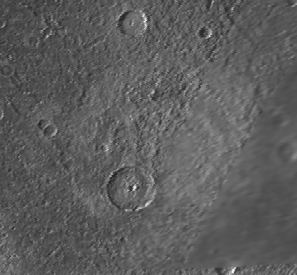
A photograph of Nidaba, taken by Voyager 2 in July 1979.

During its July 1979 flyby, Voyager 2 became the first spacecraft to clearly image the side of Ganymede that never faces Jupiter. During its closest approach, the probe successfully captured images of Galileo Regio and Nidaba.

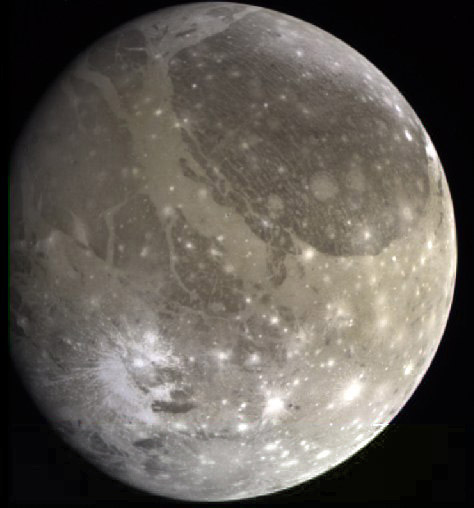
A global image of Ganymede taken by Galileo in June 1996. Nidaba crater is visible among the faculae and craters on the right side of the dark Galileo Regio.

Galileo was the next—and, as of 2026, the last—spacecraft to explore and image Nidaba. It did so while orbiting Jupiter from December 1995 to September 2003. Galileo obtained medium-resolution images of Nidaba; however, during its close flyby of Galileo Regio in June 1996, the spacecraft focused its camera on the nearby Memphis Facula instead. As a result, Nidaba was not imaged at high resolution.

=== Future missions ===
The European Space Agency's (ESA) Jupiter Icy Moons Explorer (Juice) is scheduled to arrive at Jupiter in July 2031. After conducting multiple flybys of Europa, Ganymede, and Callisto during approximately three and a half years in orbit around Jupiter, Juice will enter a low orbit around Ganymede in July 2034, at an altitude of about 500 kilometres (310 mi). The probe is expected to return high-resolution images of Nidaba which Galileo missed.

== See also ==
- List of craters on Ganymede
- Meteor
