= Ninki (crater) =

Crater on Ganymede

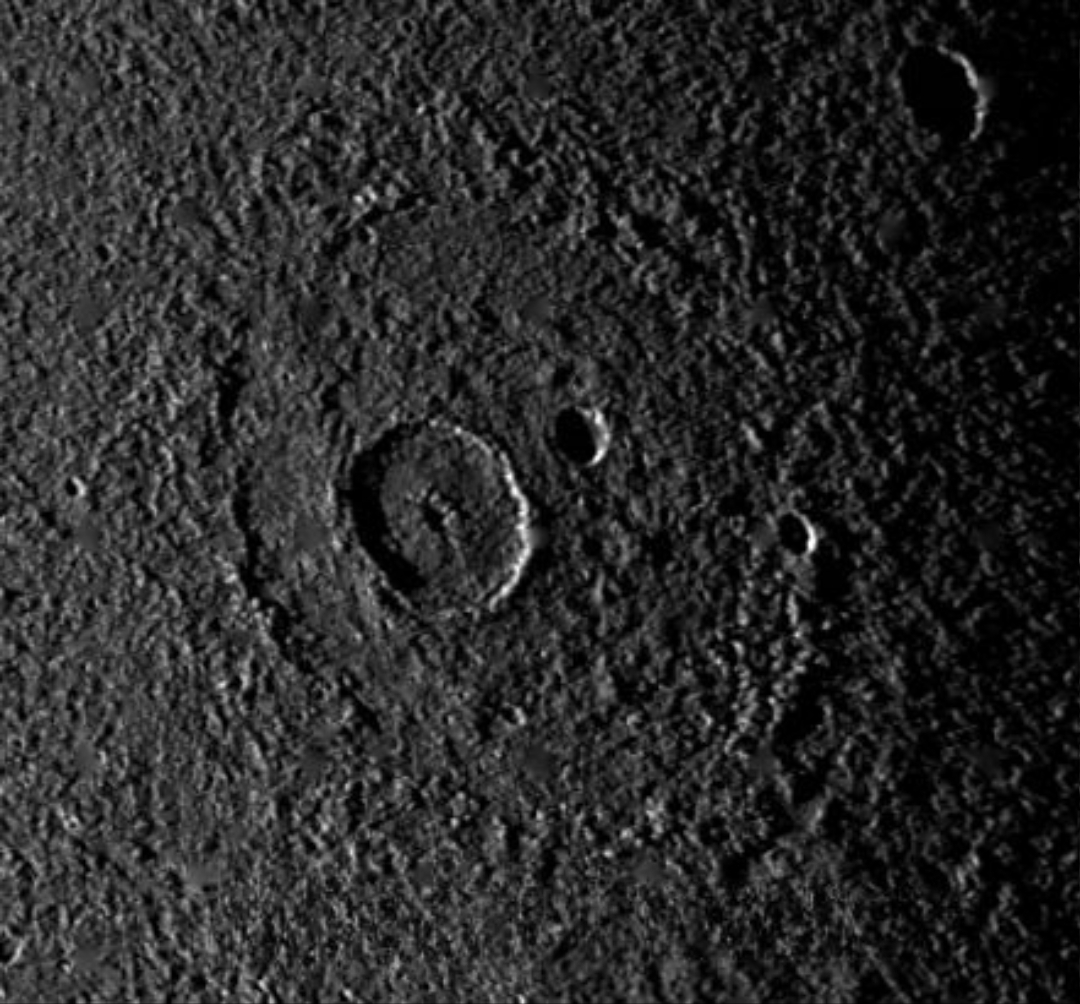
- An image of Ninki, taken by Voyager 2 on 9 July 1979.
- Feature type: Pit crater (LPI) or Impact basin (USGS)
- Coordinates: 8.37°S 120.79°W
- Diameter: 194 kilometres (121 mi) (including surrounding basin per USGS)
- Eponym: Ninki

Ninki is a crater on Ganymede, the largest moon of Jupiter. The crater is approximately 194 kilometres (121 mi) wide, including the outer, larger basin.

== Naming ==
Ninki is named after the Mesopotamian primordial goddess Ninki. Her identity in mythology is not entirely clear. The International Astronomical Union (IAU), the organization responsible for formally naming surface features on celestial bodies, identifies Ninki as the wife of the god Ea. Other sources describe Ninki as an earth goddess and one of the ancestors of Ea. However, there is no clear or consistent documentation in surviving mythological texts that firmly establishes Ninki's role or attributes.

Ninki's name follows the naming convention established by the IAU, which specifies that craters on Ganymede should be named after deities, heroes, or places from Ancient Middle Eastern mythology. Mesopotamian and Babylonian mythology mythologies.The IAU approved the name for Ninki in 1985.

== Location ==
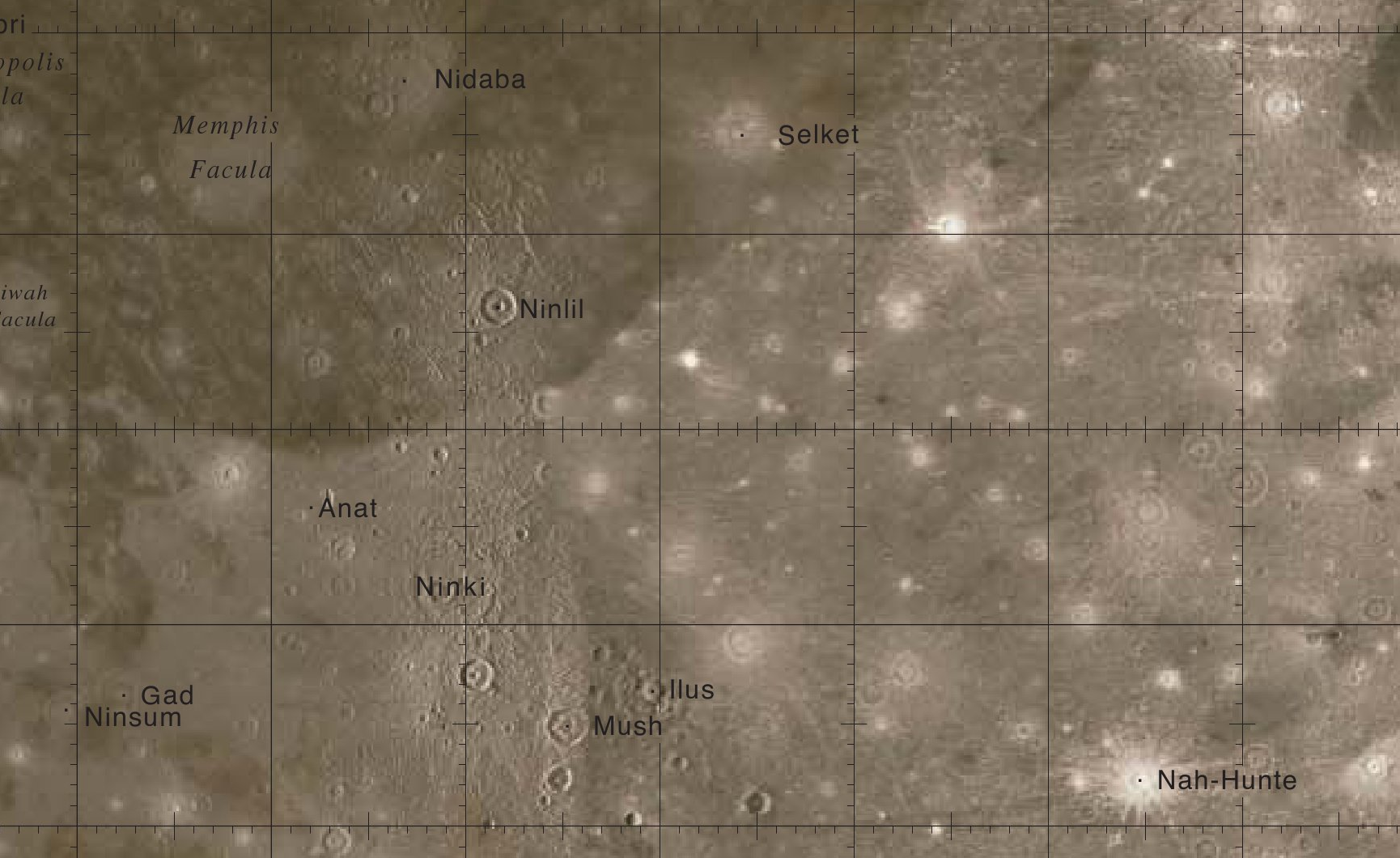
The Memphis Facula quadrangle on Ganymede where Ninki is located.

Ninki is a crater located within a larger, unnamed impact basin, sometimes called the "Western Equatorial Basin". On the other hand, according to the map of the United States Geological Survey, however, the "Western Equatorial Basin" is, in fact, part of Ninki.

The crater is situated on the western edge of a bright, grooved terrain called Babylon Sulci, and southeast of a massive, dark and ancient region on Ganymede called Galileo Regio.

The area around Ninki is relatively smooth and not heavily cratered. To its west lie the craters Ninsum and Gad, as well as the terminus of another bright, grooved terrain called Uruk Sulcus. To the northwest lies the crater Anat, the arbitrary point on Ganymede that marks the 128° West longitude of the moon. To the southeast are two named craters, Mush and Ilus.

Ninki is located within the Memphis Facula quadrangle (or section) of Ganymede (designated Jg7).

In addition, the crater is located on the hemisphere of Ganymede that never faces Jupiter. This situation is a result of the moon's synchronous rotation as it orbits around its parent planet. If an observer were to stand on Ninki, they would never see Jupiter in the sky.

== Age ==
The groups of lineaments observed within the Ninki basin indicate post-impact tectonic activity that occurred after the formation of the crater. These lineaments share similar orientations and extensional characteristics with the surrounding grooves of Babylon Sulci, suggesting that both features formed under the same regional stress regime. This situation has forced planetary scientists to reconsider their age estimates for both Babylon Sulci and Ninki. Like many bright terrains on Ganymede—commonly referred to as sulci like Babylon—Babylon Sulci has traditionally been regarded as a relatively young bright terrain. Estimates place the formation of its grooves between approximately 3.8 and 3.1 billion years ago, formed from fresh water ice welling up from beneath the moon's surface. The presence of a nearby ray crater inferred to be less than 1 billion years old indicates that tectonic activity on Ganymede persisted long after the formation of the sulci.

== Geology ==
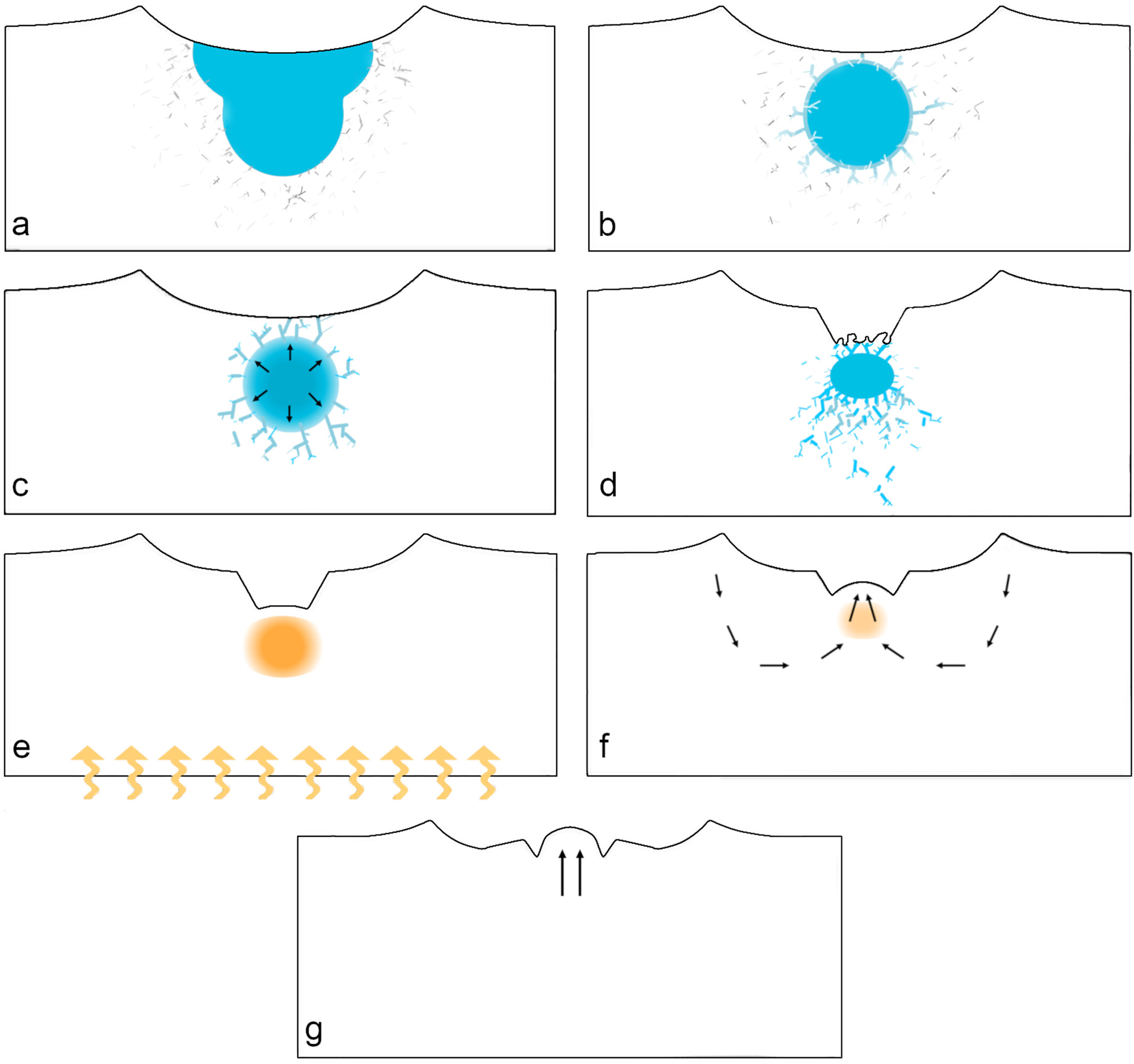
A diagram showing the steps in the formation of pits dome craters on icy moons. It shows how the refreezing of meltwater from meteorite impacts can cause both the formation of sinkholes and the dome-forming expansion of an icy crust.

The inner main crater of Ninki appears to be a pit crater. Pit craters are commonplace in Ganymede and they are thought to have been created by the refreezing of the meltwater generated by the impact of an asteroid or comet on Ganymede's icy surface. As the meltwater expands when it freezes, it disrupts and damages the crater floor, creating a central sinkhole and forming a pit. Some studies suggest that pit craters larger than 60 kilometres (37 mi) in diameter may evolve further by forming a dome, and eventually develop into ghost craters as the dome expands and the surrounding icy surface relaxes.

=== Western Equatorial Basin ===
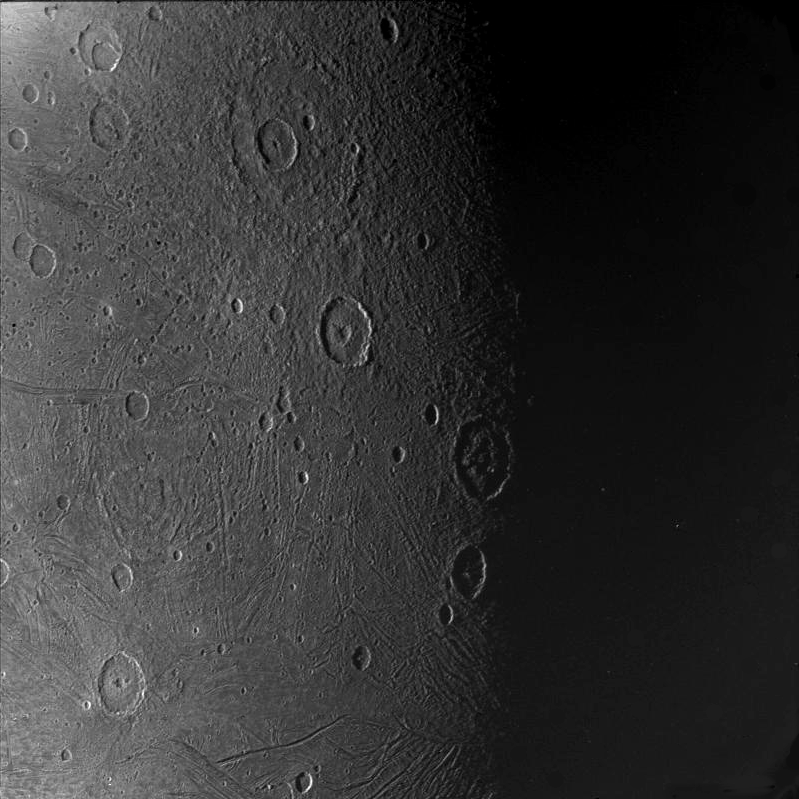
An image Ninki crater (upper part of the image, slightly left of center) taken by Voyager 2 in July 1979. The larger crater straddling the terminator of Ganymede is Mush.

On the other hand, it is no longer possible to determine whether the outer Western Equatorial basin was originally a pit or a dome crater because the impact that formed the inner crater destroyed the original center of the outer basin. The Western Equatorial basin is comparable to the crater Gilgamesh. The Western Equatorial basin is only slightly more flattened due to viscous relaxation compared to Gilgamesh. This observation suggests that the basin is only slightly older than Gilgamesh, a conclusion supported by using the crater counting method.

Determining the boundaries of the initial excavation (transient) cavities of impact basins remains challenging. However, compared to other similar craters like the aforementioned Gilgamesh, the limits of the Western Equatorial basin are less ambiguous: the transient cavity of the Western Equatorial basin is thought to coincide with its outer scarp. In this study, planetary scientists attempted to refine these boundaries by identifying 'ghost craters' and analyzing correlations between the distribution of secondary craters and the size of the main crater. The best available images from passing space probes show that there are no ghost craters around the Western Equatorial Basin.

Lastly, the estimated transient cavity depth of the Western Equatorial basin is about 13 kilometres (8.1 mi), based on the depth-to-radius ratio observed for bowl-shaped craters on the Moon (approximately 1:5; Passey and Shoemaker, 1982). This suggests that the lithospheric thickness at the time of the impact was roughly 13 kilometres (8.1 mi). According to the proposed radius, the lithosphere would have been much thicker, implying a rapid cooling and thickening of Ganymede's lithosphere. In contrast, the depth-based estimates suggest a slower cooling and thickening, consistent with a lithosphere of approximately 13 kilometres (8.1 mi) at the time of the Western Equatorial event. These values provide important constraints for models of Ganymede's thermal history.

== Exploration ==
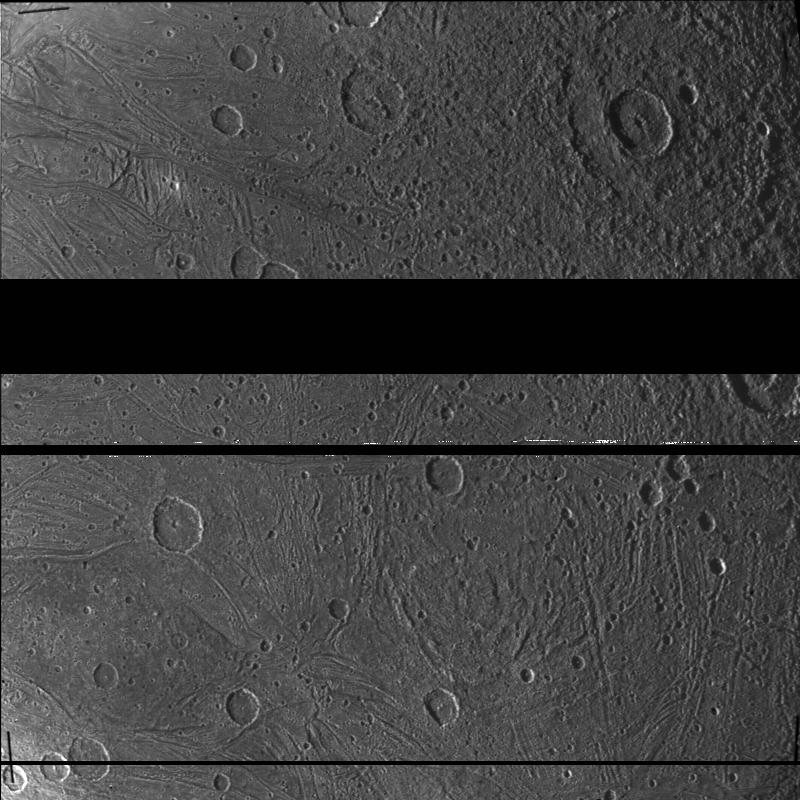
An image of the western region of Babylon Sulci, taken by Voyager 2 in July 1979. Ninki is located on the upper right corner of the image.

Voyager 2 was the first spacecraft to image the side of Ganymede that never faces Jupiter during its flyby in July 1979. The probe imaged the surrounding regions of the Ninki in excellent details.

The Galileo probe was the next—and, as of 2026, the last—spacecraft to observe Ninki while orbiting Jupiter from December 1995 to September 2003. However, no images of Ninki taken by Galileo are available in the planetary image archives.

=== Future Missions ===
The European Space Agency's (ESA) Jupiter Icy Moons Explorer (Juice) is scheduled to arrive at Jupiter in July 2031. In 2034, after performing several flybys of Europa, Ganymede and Callisto while orbiting Jupiter for three and a half years, Juice is will settle into a low orbit around Ganymede at a distance of just 500 kilometres (310 mi) in July 2034. The probe will return images of Ninki, completing the imagery archive that Galileo was unable to capture.

== See also ==
- List of craters on Ganymede
- Meteor
