= Anat (crater) =

Crater on Ganymede

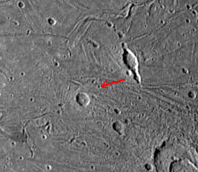
- An image showing the small crater Anat, taken by Voyager 2 on 9 July 1979.
- Feature type: Crater
- Coordinates: 4.1°S 128°W
- Diameter: 2.9 kilometres (1.8 mi)
- Eponym: Anat

Anat is a small crater on Ganymede, the largest moon of the planet Jupiter. At approximately 2.9 kilometres (1.8 mi) in diameter, it is the smallest named crater on Ganymede. Despite its small size, the crater's center was chosen as the point through which the moon's 128° W meridian passes. The longitudinal coordinates of all other craters and surface features on Ganymede are based on Anat's location.

== Naming ==
Anat is named after the major Phoenician goddess Anat, who is described as the sister of the Phoenician queen of the gods Astarte and of Baal-Hadad, the king of the gods who was probably also her consort. She is portrayed as an extremely warlike deity who revels in the bloodshed of battle.

Anat's violent nature is particularly remembered in the story known as the Baal Cycle. In this narrative, Baal-Hadad is killed by his brother Mot, the Phoenician god of the dead and the underworld, bringing droughts and famine to the world. After Baal-Hadad's soul descends into the underworld following his defeat, Anat attacks Mot. Phoenician literature graphically describes how she dismembers, burns and scatters Mot's body before rescuing Baal-Hadad, restoring him to life, and bringing him back to the surface world, allowing spring and life to return.

The naming of craters on Ganymede follows the convention established by the International Astronomical Union (IAU), which requires all craters on Ganymede to be named after deities, heroes, and places from Ancient Near Eastern mythologies, a category that includes Anat from Canaanite (or Phoenician) mythology.

The IAU approved the name Anat in 1985.

== Location ==
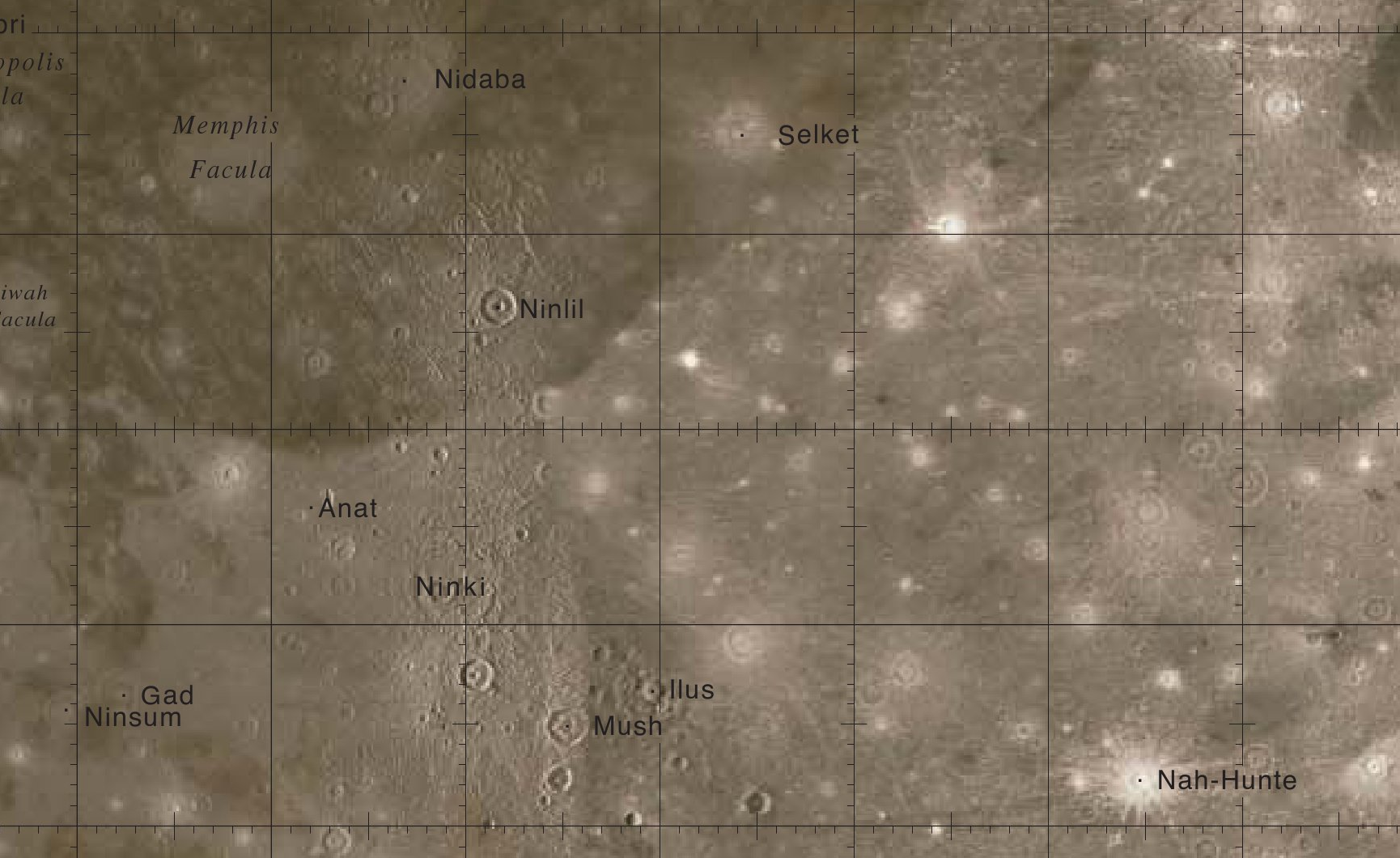
The Memphis Facula quadrangle on Ganymede where Anat is located.

The tiny crater Anat serves as the primary reference point for Ganymede's longitudinal coordinate system. Its center marks the exact location through which the moon's 128° W meridian passes. By definition, Anat is at 128° longitude. The crater's small size makes it an ideal reference point.

Anat is located in the northwestern corner of the extensive, bright, grooved terrain known as Babylon Sulci.

In contrast to the brighter, younger Babylon Sulci surrounding the crater, the dark, ancient, heavily cratered terrain of Galileo Regio lies immediately to the north of Anat.

Anat is surrounded by numerous craters of varying sizes, most of which are very small. Only one nearby crater — Ninki — is noticeably big and has been given a name.

Anat is located within the Memphis Facula quadrangle (designated Jg7) of Ganymede. It is located on the hemisphere of Ganymede that always faces away from Jupiter. Due to the moon's synchronous rotation as it orbit around its parent planet, one hemisphere of Ganymede always points Jupiter while the opposite hemisphere always faces away. Therefore, an observer standing within Anat crater would never see Jupiter in the sky. (Note: For moons in synchronous rotation, such as Ganymede, 0° longitude corresponds to the part of the surface that always faces Jupiter. Regions between 90° W and 270° W longitude never face the moon's parent planet.)

== Exploration ==
As of 2026, no spacecraft have flown by Anat at close range. Voyager 2 became the first spacecraft to image the crater in July 1979, but its small size made it difficult to resolve.

Galileo also attempted to photograph the tiny crater, but the resolution of its images was insufficient to resolve any surface details.

=== Future Missions ===
The European Space Agency (ESA) has launched a space probe called the Jupiter Icy Moons Explorer (Juice) to Jupiter to study its icy moons, including Ganymede. The probe is scheduled to arrive at Jupiter in July 2031, where it will collect data from Ganymede, Europa, and Callisto through flybys.

In July 2034, Juice is scheduled to settle into a low orbit around Ganymede at an altitude of just 500 kilometres (310 mi). The spacecraft is expected to return the first close-up, high-resolution images of Anat.

== See also ==
- List of craters on Ganymede
- Meteor
