= Chrysor and Aleyin (craters) =

Crater on Ganymede

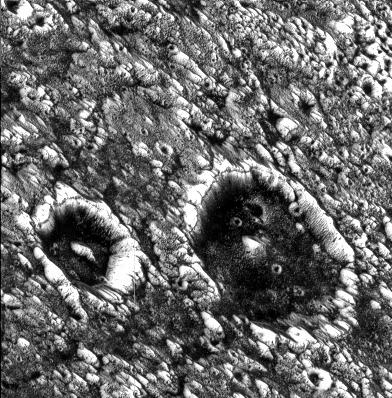
- An image of the craters Chrysor (left) and Aleyin (right), taken by the Galileo space probe on June 27 1996.
- Feature type: Dark Craters
- Coordinates: 15.2°N 134.21°W (average of both craters)
- Diameter: 7 kilometres (4.3 mi) (Chrysor) 12.40 kilometres (7.71 mi) (Aleyin)
- Eponym: Chrysor and Aleyin

Chrysor and Aleyin are a pair of small craters on Ganymede, the largest moon of Jupiter. Both craters have dark floors and are surrounded by knob-shaped peaks that form their rims.

== Naming ==
According to older sources such as the encyclopedia The Mythology of All Races, Chrysor is a heroic figure from Phoenician mythology who, according to the writer Sanchuniathon, invented the fishing hook, fishing line, and the fishing boat. Chrysor was later deified under the name Diamichius.

According to the International Astronomical Union (IAU), the organization responsible for formally naming surface features on celestial objects, Aleyin is named after a god of springs from Phoenician mythology. The IAU states that Aleyin is a son of Ba'al but no other sources confirm Aleyin's identity.

The IAU ruled that craters on Ganymede should be named after deities, heroes or places from Ancient Middle Eastern mythologies. Phoenician mythology is traditionally considered as a Middle Eastern mythology. The IAU approved the names for both Chrysor and Aleyin in 1997.

A webpage of NASA spells the name of Aleyin crater as "Aleyn" instead.

== Location ==
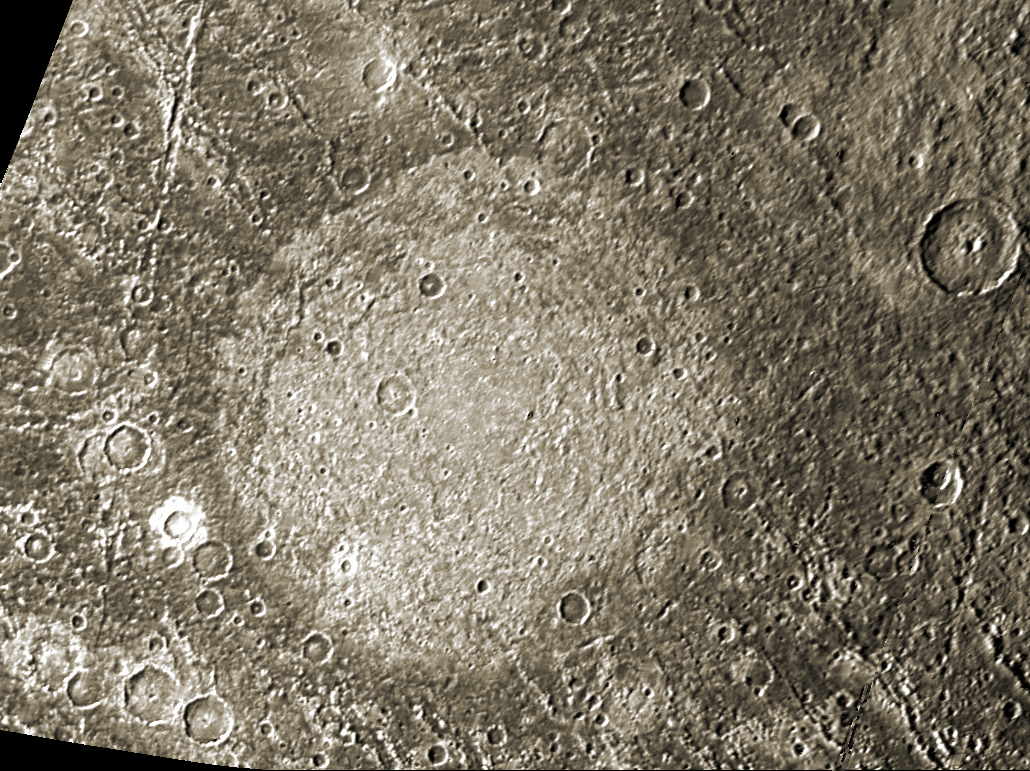
An image of Memphis Facula. Chrysor and Aleyin are the two craters on the western side of the bright circular area.

Chrysor and Aleyin are less than 10 kilometres (6.2 mi) apart from each other. Both are located within the western section of a relatively bright region on Ganymede known as Memphis Facula. This facula, in turn, lies within an extensive dark region called Galileo Regio.

Both Chrysor and Aleyin are located within the Memphis Facula quadrangle (or section) of Ganymede (designated Jg7).

== Morphology and Geography ==
Both Chrysor and Aleyin are considered as impact craters based on classic impact features that they both possess such as steep walls, relatively flat floors, and central peaks. Bright water ice is exposed on their walls, rims, and central peaks while darker material covers the crater floors and appears to flow down the inner walls, likely concentrated there during the impact events.

Most dark-floored craters in the outer regions are thought to have penetrated a thin layer of bright material to expose underlying dark material. A dark line near theirs rim may represent uplifted layered bedrock, exposed by the impact. Both craters are heavily degraded. Their ejecta blankets and secondary crater fields are no longer visible—indicating they are very old, probably hundreds of millions of years in age.

As mentioned above, both craters sit on Memphis Facula, a wider, bright feature thought to have formed when a much larger ancient impact excavated bright subsurface water ice. Notably, while Chrysor and Aleyin have dark floors, other nearby craters such as Hay-tau do not exhibit dark floors.

The original diameter of Memphis Facula is estimated to be approximately 245 kilometres (152 mi), roughly corresponding to the location of Chrysor or just within Aleyin.

== Exploration ==
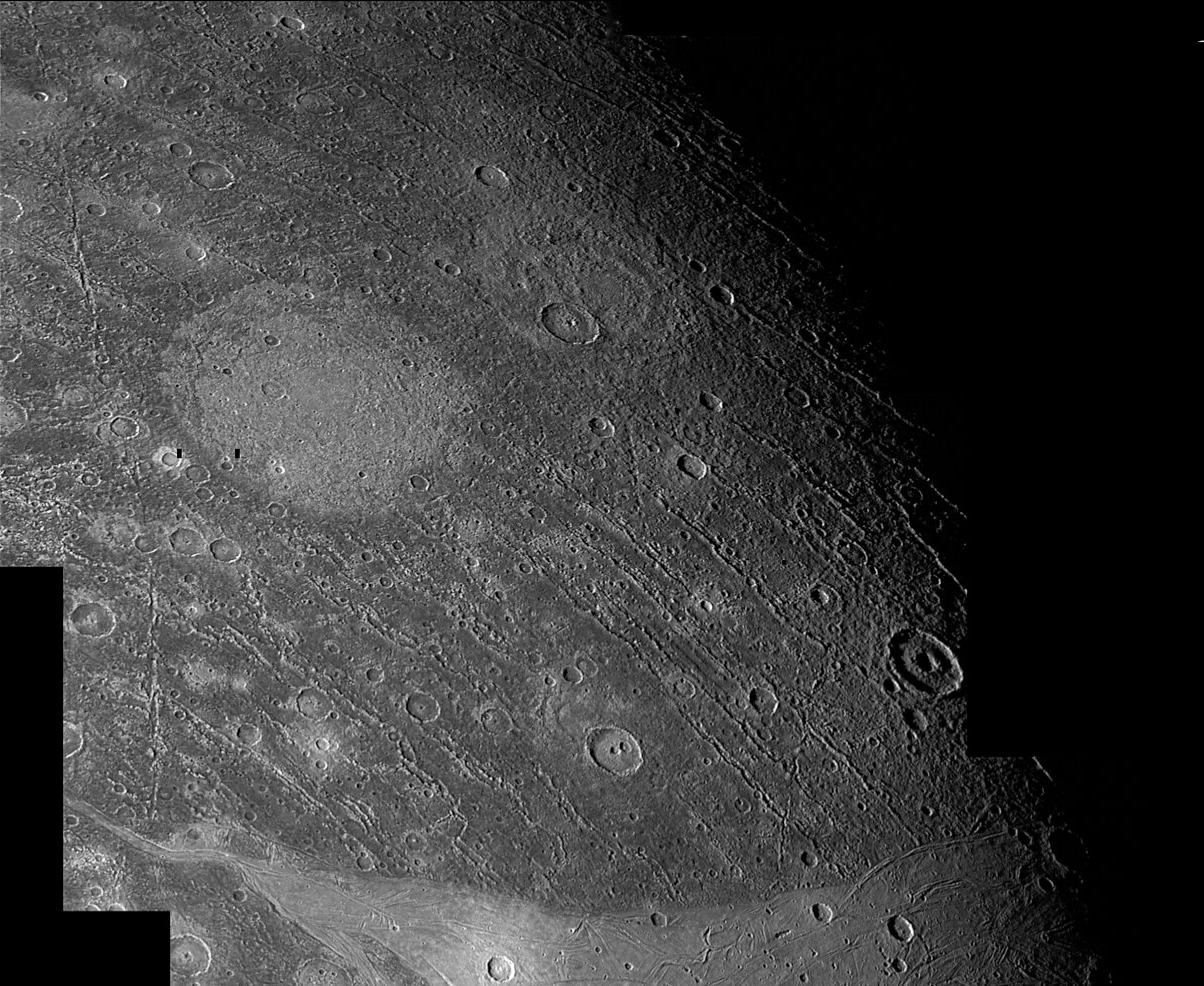
An image of Ganymede, showing Memphis Facula (left from the center). Chrysor and Aleyin are situated on the western side of the bright area.

The first spacecraft to explore and photograph Chrysor and Aleyin was Voyager 2, which flew by Ganymede in July 1979. The two craters, along with the surrounding Memphis Facula, were imaged at high resolution.

The next and last spacecraft to image Chrysor and Aleyin was Galileo, which flew above Memphis Facula in June 1996. The probe flew over the craters at a distance of just 2,850 kilometres (1,770 mi), and was able to resolve details as small as 59 metres (194 ft) in its images.

=== Future Mission ===
The next spacecraft dedicated to studying Ganymede is the European Space Agency's (ESA) Jupiter Icy Moons Explorer (Juice) mission. The probe is scheduled to arrive at Jupiter in July 2031, and after approximately three and a half years of orbiting Jupiter and performing multiple flybys of Europa, Ganymede, and Callisto, Juice will enter a low polar orbit around Ganymede at an altitude of about 500 kilometres (310 mi).

== See also ==
- En-zu - another dark floor crater on Ganymede
- Khensu a dark floor crater near Ganymede's equator
- Nergal - a relatively young dark crater obscuring a younger groove terrain on Ganymede
- List of craters on Ganymede
- Meteor
