= Ghost craters on Mercury =

Ghost craters on the planet Mercury have tectonic features such as graben and wrinkle ridges. These features were formed by extensional and contractional forces originating in tectonic processes such as uplift and global contraction. The combination of graben and wrinkle ridges inside ghost craters found on Mercury has not been observed on any of the other terrestrial planets.

== Discovery ==
The tectonic features on Mercury were not studied in precise detail until the MESSENGER spacecraft was sent to Mercury; by 2009 the MESSENGER spacecraft had mapped 98% of the planet's surface. By 2013, Messenger mapped 100% of the planet's surface. Mercury Dual Imaging System cameras and Mercury Laser Altimeter equipment on the messenger spacecraft allowed for researchers to obtain high-resolution images of the planet's surface for analyzing Mercury's tectonics.

Izquierdo crater (right of center) showing multiple ghost craters and graben within.

== Ghost craters ==
Ghost craters are impact craters that have been filled with volcanic deposits. Ghost craters can be observed on the surface of the Moon, Mars, Mercury, and may possibly exist on Venus. On Mercury, ghost craters are most commonly found in the northern hemisphere of the planet in the smooth plains. There are three types of ghost craters on Mercury. Type one ghost craters contains a wrinkle ridge that forms a ring while type two ghost craters contain a wrinkle ridge ring and graben in the interior. Type three ghost crater's wrinkle ridge ring either does not exist or can not be observed. Instead, it has a ring of graben along its border.

== Tectonic features ==
=== Graben ===
A graben is a tectonic feature associated with normal faulting. The footwall is raised while the hanging wall is lowered, creating a depression. The graben are thought to have formed from extensional stresses due to uplift and contraction of the volcanic deposits that filled the crater. Uplift is possible by isostatic rebound in response to the formation of the crater or from the volcanic material being deposited. The volcanic material will contract as it cools, and this cooling generates extensional stresses. The orientation of a graben is determined based on the stress at the time of its formation. Radial graben form when basin-circumferential stresses are the most extensional. When radial stresses are the most extensional, circumferential graben form. If radial stress and circumferential stress are equal, then polygonal patterns form.

=== Wrinkle ridges ===
Wrinkle ridges are tectonic feature where sections of the crust are uplifted. Wrinkle ridges are associated with compressional stresses. On Mercury, the planet's interior is cooling and contracting. This contraction creates planet-wide compression. Wrinkle ridges on Mercury are thought to come from material loaded on top of the volcanic plains, in addition to the cooling. When plains have volcanic material deposited on top, the lithosphere can flex and create more compressional stresses.

== Temporal relationships ==
Scientists used cross-cutting relationships in order to determine the sequence of events that formed ghost craters. Most likely, an impact struck Mercury. Then volcanic material flooded over the surface and filled the inside of the crater. Next, the graben or wrinkle ridges formed. When the graben are all included within the wrinkle ridges, then they are interpreted to have formed after the wrinkle ridges. If a graben cuts across a ridge and appears to be modified, then it is interpreted to be older, and to have formed before the ridges.

== Importance ==
The presence of both graben and wrinkle ridges within ghost craters is a feature unique to Mercury. This combination is because of the tectonic processes that formed the graben and wrinkle ridges. The graben and wrinkle ridges came from rapidly accumulating lava flows that cooled within impact craters while the planet was experiencing global contraction from interior cooling. Other planetary bodies such as the Moon and Mars do not have both tectonic features within their ghost craters, possibly due to the accumulation rates of volcanic material on the Moon and Mars being slower than the rates on Mercury.
