= Palimpsest (planetary astronomy) =

Astronomical geographical feature

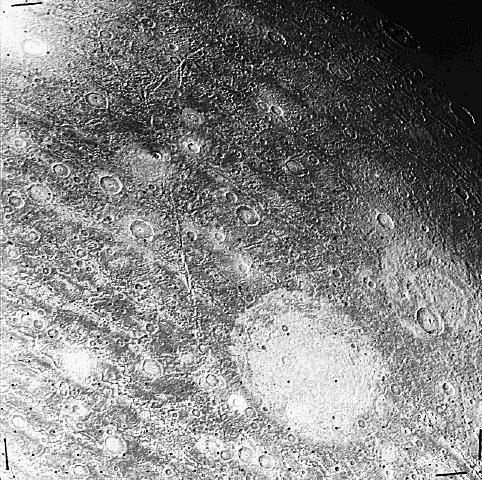
Voyager 2 image of Memphis Facula (white patch at lower right) on Ganymede

A palimpsest /ˈpælɪmpsɛst/, in planetary astronomy, is an ancient crater that has been degraded over time. They may also be referred to as "ghost craters", "degraded craters", "buried craters", or "pathological craters". Palimpsests have been identified on Mercury, the Earth, the Moon, Mars, Ganymede, Callisto, and possibly even Titan. On Mars, these features are morphologically described as craters that are "flat-floored, rimless, extremely shallow, without central peaks, and would probably represent what remains after erosion."

On an icy moon of the outer Solar System, a palimpsest is a crater whose relief has disappeared due to creep of the icy surface ("viscous relaxation") or subsequent cryovolcanic outpourings, leaving a circular albedo feature, perhaps with a "ghost" of a rim. Icy surfaces of natural satellites like Callisto and Ganymede preserve hints of their history in these rings. A typical example is Memphis Facula on Ganymede, a 340 km wide palimpsest.

== See also ==
- Palimpsest (geology)
- Ghost craters on Mercury
