= Memphis Facula =

Degraded crater on Ganymede

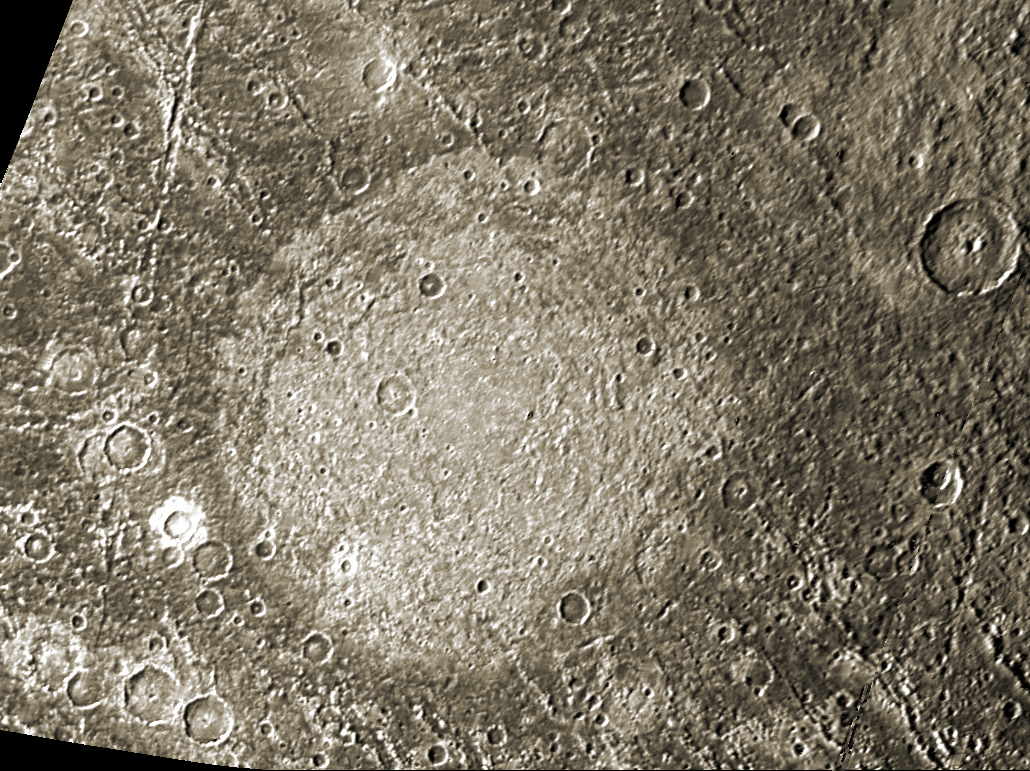
- A mosaic image of Memphis Facula assembled from Voyager 2 images, taken on July 9, 1979. The smaller, darker, more rugged Nidaba to its upper right is considered a crater.
- Feature type: Facula
- Coordinates: 14.1°N 131.9°W
- Diameter: 360 km (220 mi)
- Eponym: Memphis, Egypt

Memphis Facula /ˈmɛmfɪs ˈfækjʊlə/ is a palimpsest, or "ghost crater", on Ganymede, the largest of the Jovian satellites. It is a bright, circular surface feature that is about 360 km (220 mi) across, and is considered relatively old.

== Naming ==
Memphis is named after the capital city of Ancient Egypt. It was also the center of worship of the Egyptian god Ptah who became one of the supreme creator gods of Egypt for many centuries due to the city's political and royal significance.

The International Astronomical Union's (IAU) naming convention states that all faculae on Ganymede should be named after places that are of great importance in Egyptian mythology. More specifically, all named faculae on the moon are named after important places of worship in Ancient Egypt. In this case, Memphis was the center of worship of Ptah, his wife Sekhmet, and their son Nefertem.

== Location ==
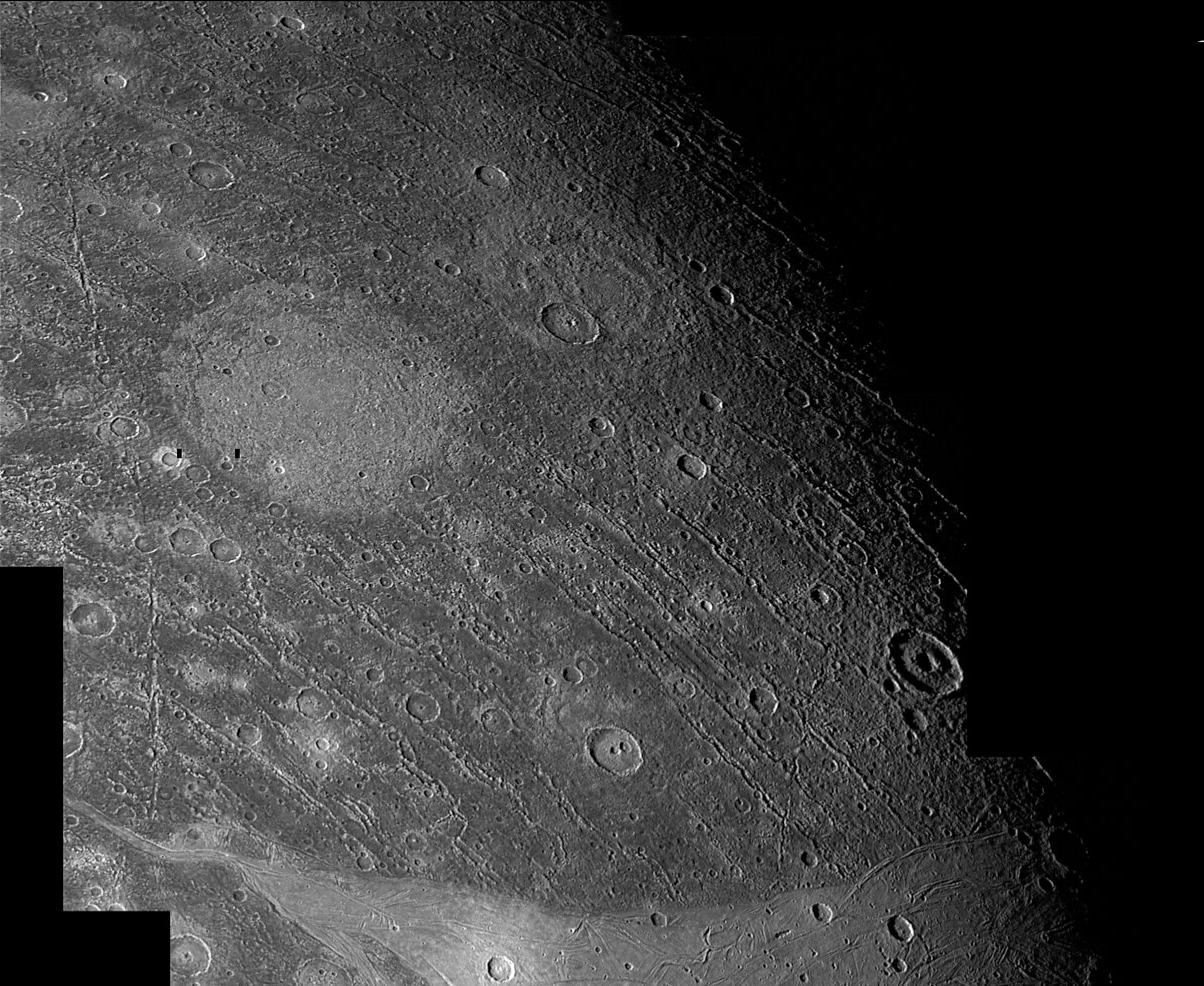
An image of Memphis Facula (slightly upper left from the center), taken by Voyager 2 in July 1979.

Memphis Facula is situated in the southern part of Galileo Regio, a huge, roughly circular dark region in Ganymede's northern hemisphere. It is surrounded by many craters, and its interior also has a lot of craters.

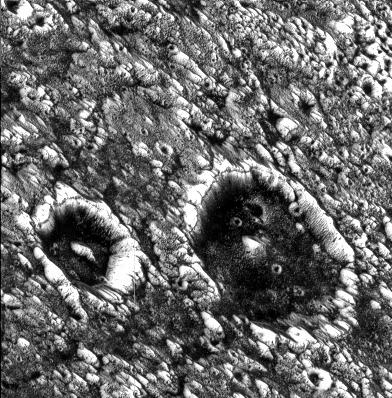
Two dark craters called Chrysor (left) and Aleyin (right) that are located within Memphis Facula. This image was taken by the Galileo space probe in July 1998.

Within Memphis Facula lie three named craters — Aleyin and Chrysor, which are beside each other, and Hay-tau.

To the northeast of Memphis Facula is the crater Nidaba, while to its southeast is the crater Ninlil.

The areas of Ganymede's surface that are south, east, and southeast of Memphis Facula are considered part of the Memphis Facula quadrangle (designated Jg7). The quadrangle also includes parts of Galileo Regio, particularly the areas of the regio that are close to Memphis Facula, despite the fact that Galileo Regio has its own quadrangle. From the west, parts of the neighboring Uruk Sulcus (the namesake of the Uruk quadrangle) is also crossing over into the Memphis Facula quadrangle.

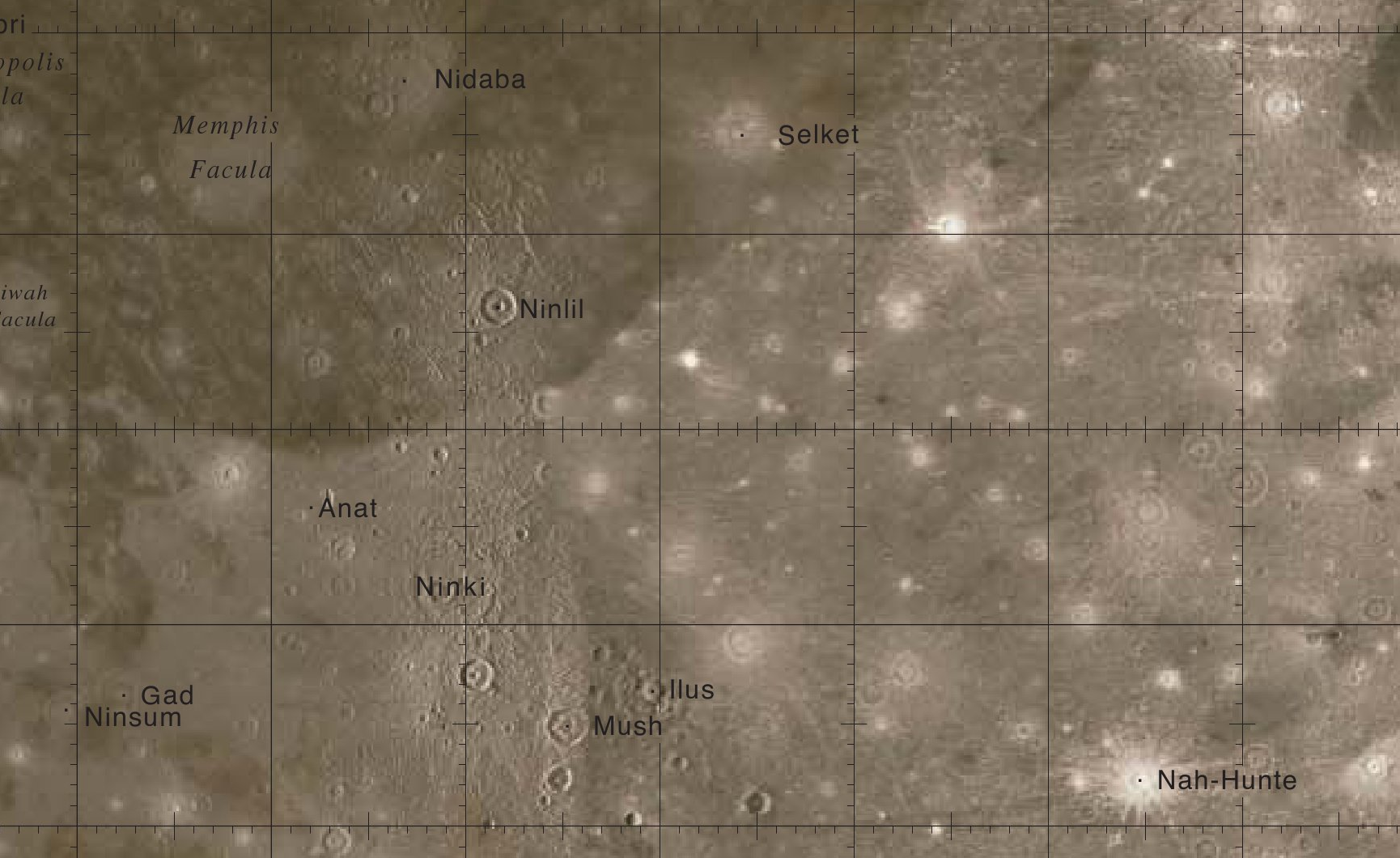
The Memphis Facula quadrangle where the facula is located.

Memphis Facula lies on the side of Ganymede that never faces Jupiter as a consequence of the moon's synchronous rotation. As a result, an observer on Memphis Facula will never see Jupiter in the sky.

== Geology ==
Memphis Facula is a relatively bright, circular patch on Ganymede's surface that is completely surrounded by the darker Galileo Regio. Although it is almost completely leveled today, Memphis Facula is a relic of a massive impact and was once a deep impact crater. As time went on, its walls have slumped and its floor has risen isostatically, smoothing out the remaining topography into a slush.

The morphology of larger palimpsests like Memphis Facula suggests that at the time of the asteroid impact, Ganymede's icy crust was about 10 km thick, and was penetrated by the impact, allowing the slush and fluid beneath to fill and level out the crater. The original diameter of Memphis Facula is estimated to be approximately 245 kilometres (152 mi), roughly corresponding to the location of Chrysor or just within Aleyin.

By analyzing the density of superposed craters within the facula, planetary scientists can estimate the age of the surface, which is thought to be several hundred million years old.

== Exploration ==
Memphis Facula has been photographed and explored by three space probes — Voyager 1, Voyager 2 and Galileo.

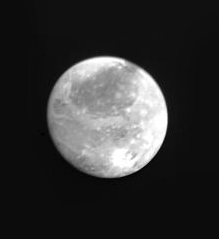
A distant image of Ganymede, taken by Voyager 1 in February 1979. Memphis Facula is the widest bright spot within the dark regio in the northern part of Ganymede, slightly above the center of the image.

Voyager 1 became the first spacecraft in history to image and identify Memphis Facula as it approached Ganymede during the final two days of February 1979. At that time, Ganymede was still several million kilometers away, allowing the spacecraft to obtain only low-resolution images of the surface feature. By the time of Voyager 1's closest approach to Jupiter and Ganymede in March 1979, Memphis Facula had already rotated onto Ganymede's night side so no high resolution images of the facula could be obtained.

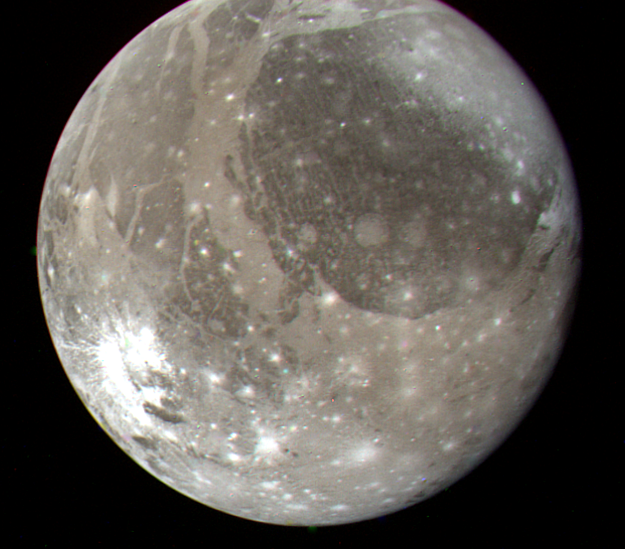
A mosaic photograph of Ganymede showing Memphis Facula (center slightly to the right) within the larger, darker Galileo Regio, taken by Voyager 2 in July 1979.

On the other hand, Voyager 2 performed much closer flyby of Ganymede's anti-Jovian hemisphere during its visit to the Jovian system in July 1979. It was able to image Memphis Facula, along with several other faculae within Galileo Regio. It was not able to take any close-up images of the facula or its surroundings because its flyby trajectory did not bring it very close to the moon. Nevertheless, the image quality was enough to allow many surface features to be clearly identified for the first time.

The last probe to visit Memphis Facula was Galileo. During its flyby of Ganymede in July 1998, the space probe was able to fly as low as 2,850 km (1,770 mi) above the facula, allowing its imaging system to resolve details as small as 60 m (200 ft). As of 2025, Galileo's close-up images of Memphis Facula remain the best available images of the surface feature and the craters within it.

== Gallery ==
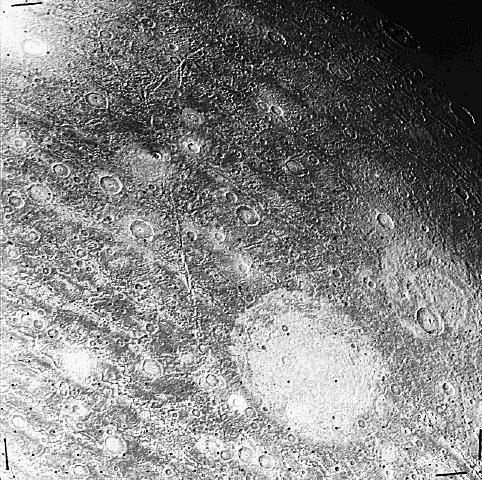
An image of Memphis Facula (lower right) and Nidiba, taken by Voyager 2 in July 1979.

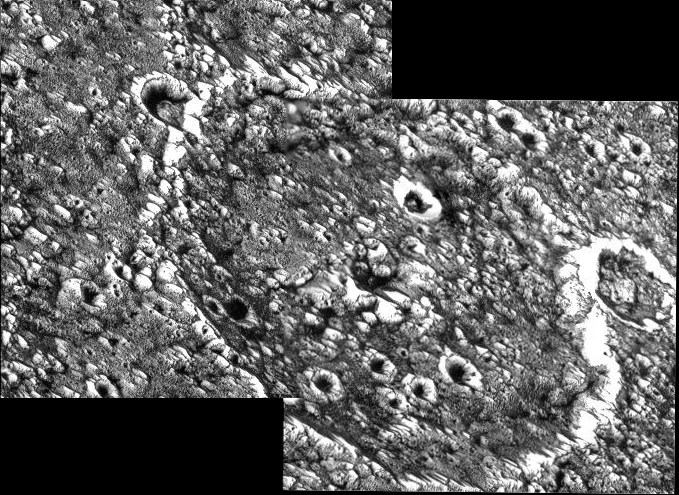
An image of Hay Tau, a crater within Memphis Facula, taken by Galileo in June 1996.

== See also ==
- Ganymede City
- List of geological features on Ganymede
