= Galileo Regio =

Dark region on Ganymede

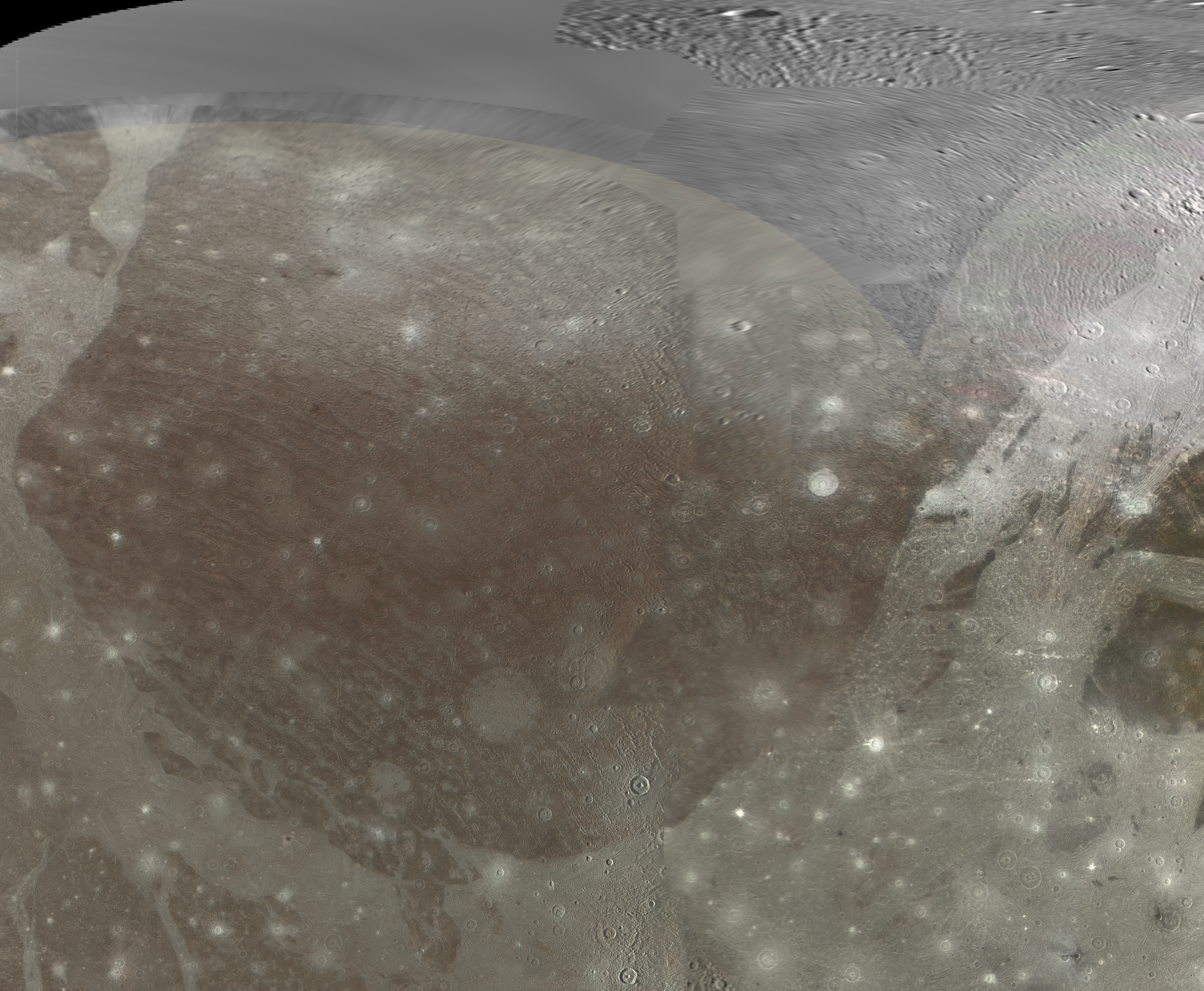
- A mosaic image of Galileo Regio, created from images taken by the Galileo space probe as it flew by Ganymede several times from 27 June 1996 to 28 December 2000.
- Feature type: Regio
- Coordinates: 47.0°N 129.6°W
- Diameter: 4,439 kilometres (2,758 mi)
- Eponym: Galileo Galilei

Galileo Regio is a large, dark surface feature on Jupiter's moon Ganymede. It is one of the most ancient and largest surface features on Ganymede, spanning as much as 4,500 kilometres (2,800 mi).

== Naming ==
The International Astronomical Union (IAU) officially named Galileo Regio after Galileo Galilei, the Italian astronomer who was one of the first person in history to use a telescope to study the night sky. He also discovered Jupiter's four largest moons, Io, Europa, Ganymede and Callisto in 1610, the first moons to be discovered using a telescope. The IAU ruled that dark regions on Ganymede be named after astronomers who contributed greatly to the discovery of moons, of whom Galileo Galilei is one. The name was approved in 1979.

== Geography and location ==
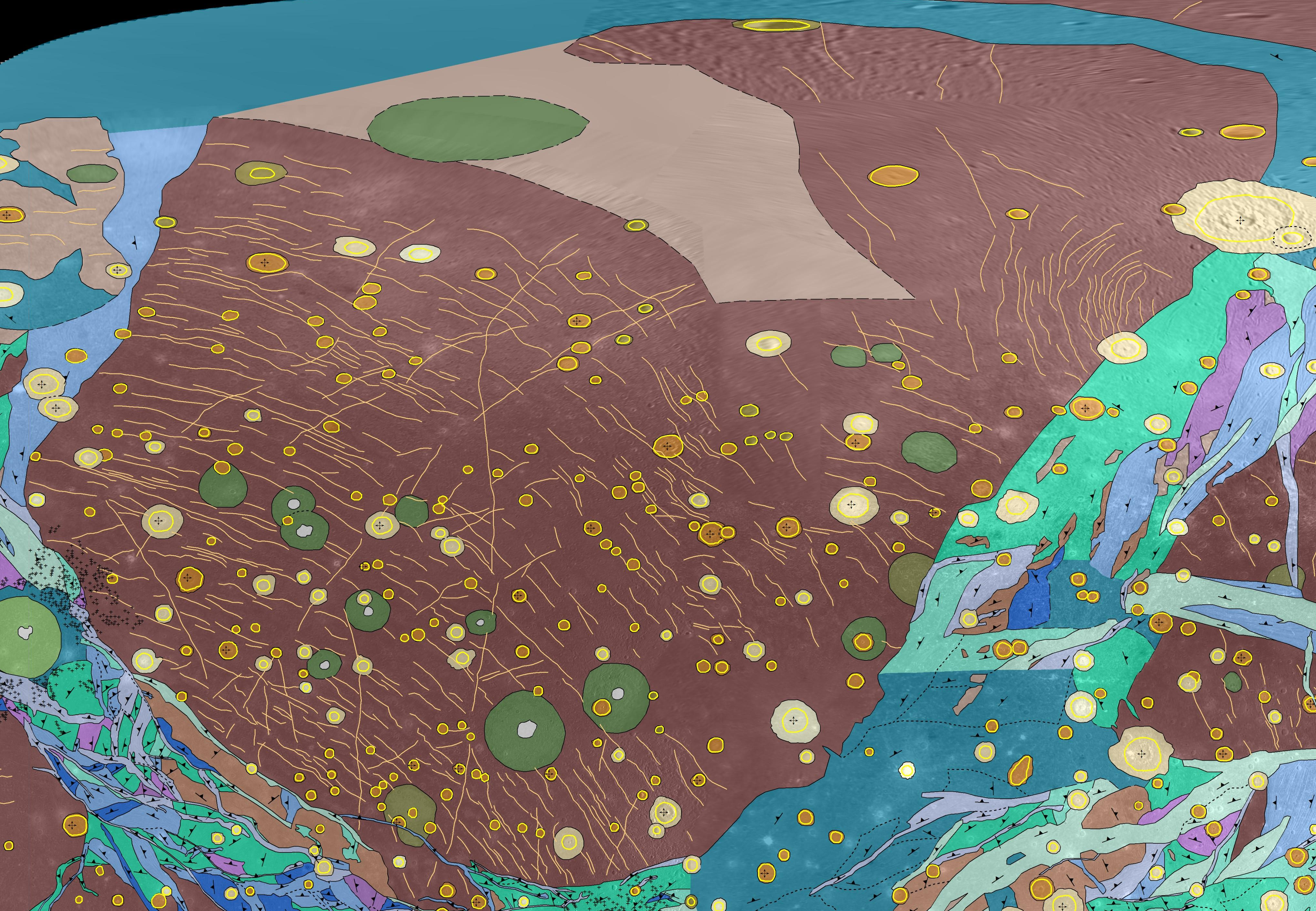
A color-coded geologic map of Galileo Regio. Dark red corresponds to the dark areas of the moon

Galileo Regio is a large region of ancient dark material located in the northern hemisphere of Ganymede. It is shaped like an oval, and it is so massive that it covers an area ranging from near Ganymede’s north pole all the way to south of its equator.

The regio has been broken apart by younger, brighter sulci, causing it to assume a bumpy oval shape. Philae Sulcus and Ur Sulcus mark its western boundary. To the southwest, Uruk Sulcus and Nippur Sulcus separate Galileo Regio from another regio called Marius Regio, while to the east, Xibalba Sulcus separates Galileo Regio from Perrine Regio. The northern part of Galileo Regio is very close to the north pole of Ganymede.

The map of the surface of Ganymede's surface is divided into 15 quadrangles. One of the quadrangles is named after Galileo Regio (designated Jg3) where most of the regio resides. However, because of its immense size, it actually crosses over into several other quadrangles, including Etana (designated Jg1) quadrangle to the north, Perrine quadrangle (designated Jg2) to the east, Memphis Facula (designated Jg7) quadrangle to the southeast and Uruk quadrangle (designated Jg8) to the southwest.

The same side of Ganymede always faces Jupiter due to its synchronous rotation. The westernmost point of Galileo Regio (which lies at the moon's 180° longitude) is directly opposite the side of Ganymede that always faces Jupiter, which means that an observer standing on the western side of the regio will never see Jupiter. However, Galileo Regio is so vast that on its eastern side, an observer will be able to see Jupiter hanging low on the horizon at all times.

== Geology and characteristic ==
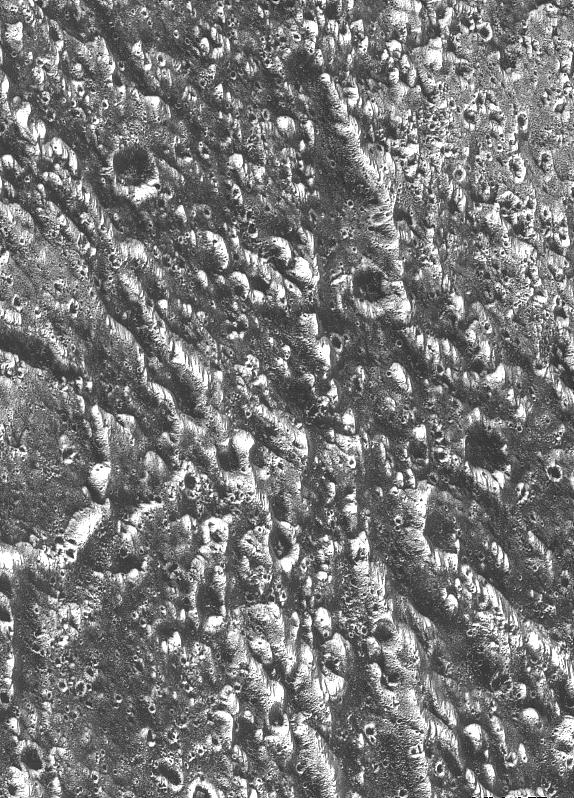
A closeup greyscale image of the western part of Galileo Regio, imaged by the Galileo space probe in September 1997. It shows the highly rugged and heavily cratered ancient terrain of the regio.

Like other dark regions on Ganymede, Galileo Regio is one of the oldest parts of the moon's surface. It is a very rugged area covered by ancient dark materials probably accumulated from dark fragments brought to the moon by falling meteors and comets. Rugged and heavily cratered terrain, in general, suggest that a surface is more ancient than smoother regions.

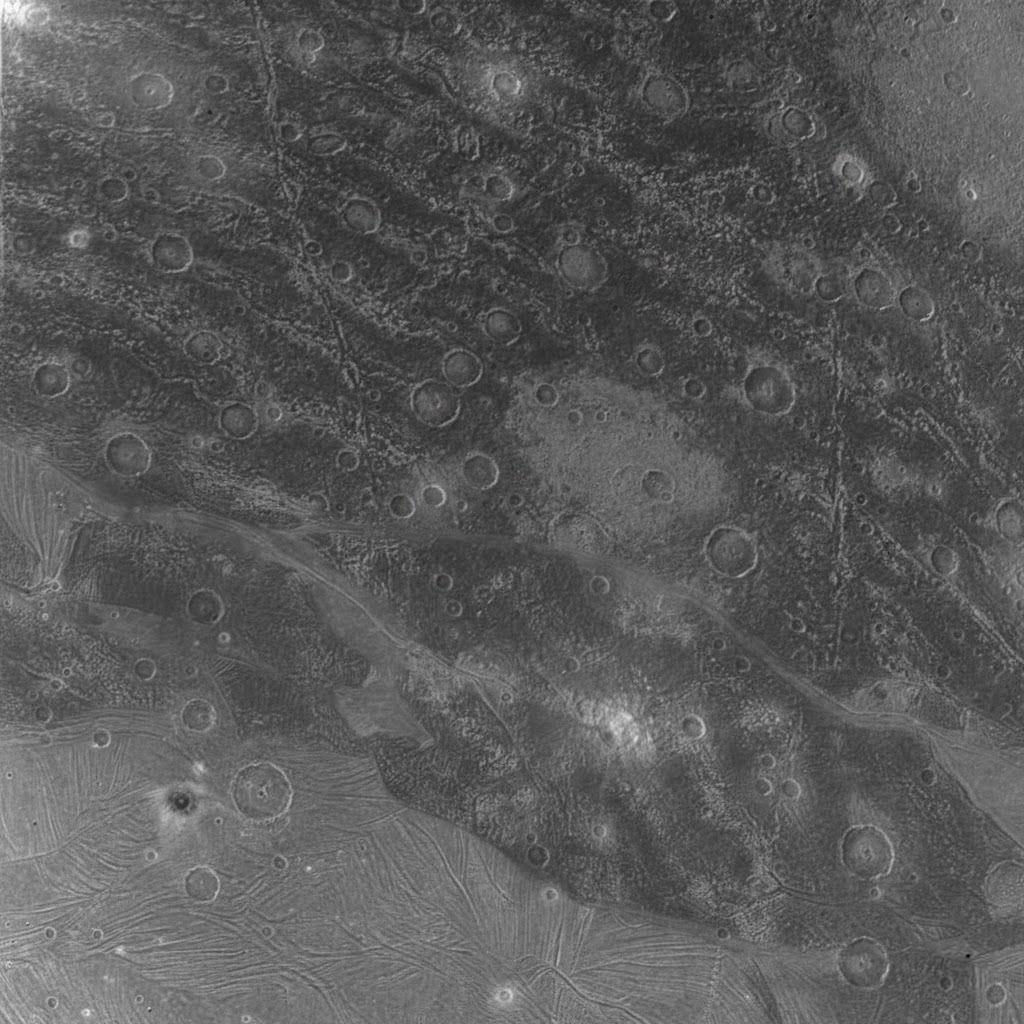
An image of Galileo Regio's southern area, taken by Voyager 2 in July 1979. The bright, circular patch in the image is Siwah Facula.

Galileo Regio is thought to be some 4 billion years old and is heavily cratered and palimpsested (meaning it is full of ghost craters). It is also full of oval features called facula, of which one of them, called Memphis Facula, is considered a ghost crater—a relic crater so old that its crater walls have slumped and its crater floor has flattened. The rest of the dark regio is pockmarked by hundreds of bright ray craters, rayless craters and other faculae. Most craters within the regio are bright, suggesting that the impactors that created them excavated a lot of fresh water ice from underneath the surface of the dark regio. Clean water ice reflects a lot of sunlight, causing them to look brighter than the surrounding, more ancient areas.

The northern and northeast side of Galileo Regio is covered with a whitish blanket of bright materials. The exact nature of these materials is not yet known, but it may be some type of condensate. It is believed that these were created from charged-particle sputtering and redistribution of water ice under the influence of Ganymede’s magnetic field.

Galileo Regio is surrounded on all sides by sulci except to its north. These sulci are younger and smoother than Galileo, and they formed due to tectonic activities that occurred after Galileo Regio had formed, effectively erasing its dark surface and replacing it with brighter, fresh materials upwelling from beneath Ganymede’s crust. The direction in which the troughs, grooves and faults of the sulci generally do not match the direction of those of Galileo regio, indicating that they are of different age. These sulci define the outline of the shape of the regio.

Galileo Regio also has a unique distribution of furrows and smooth terrain that has been the subject of conflicting speculation regarding cause or origin. The distribution of smooth terrain on Galileo Regio suggests that the ancient crust of Ganymede was relatively thin in the equatorial region and it gets thicker towards the poles. The age relationships, morphology, and geometry of the furrow systems do not favor an origin by impact or tidal stressing. A possible—though still speculative—explanation is that the feature formed through crustal uplift driven by a plume-like convection cell in a fluid mantle beneath a thin outer crust. The stratigraphic and morphological relationships between the furrows and crater palimpsests indicate that the appearance of palimpsests is primarily due to impacts occurring in a mechanically weak crust, rather than to later modification by viscous relaxation.

A study from 2020 by Hirata, Suetsugu and Ohtsuki suggests that Ganymede probably was hit by a massive asteroid 4 billion years ago; an impact so violent that may have shifted the moon's axis. The study came to this conclusion analysing images of the furrows system in the satellite's surface.

== Exploration and observation ==
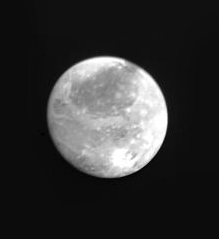
An distant image of Ganymede's anti-Jovian hemisphere, taken by Voyager 1 in February 1979. Galileo Regio is on the top of the image.

Galileo Regio has been explored by several spacecraft. Pioneer 10 was the first spacecraft to photograph the regio but its resolution was disappointingly very low. Similarly, Voyager 1 was only able to image Galileo Regio from a distance during the last days of February 1979 as it approached the Jovian system. By the time of the probe's closest approach to Ganymede in March 1979, Galileo Regio had rotated onto the moon's far side, preventing Voyager 1 from obtaining high-resolution images of the region.

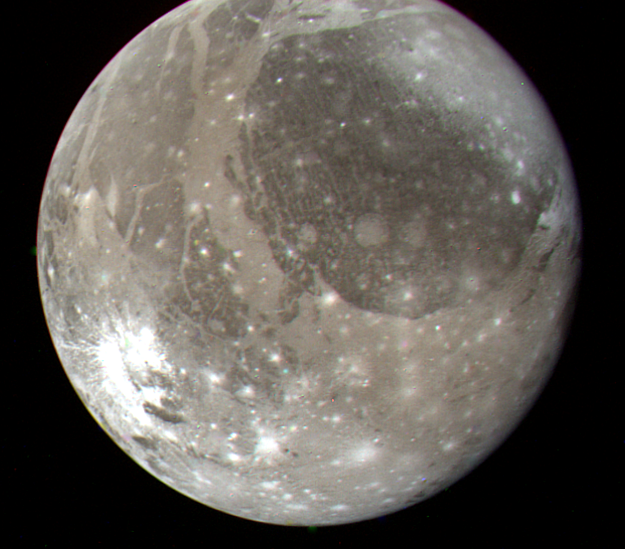
A mosaic photograph of Galileo Regio (upper right), taken by Voyager 2 in July 1979.

Voyager 2 became the first spacecraft to send clear images of Galileo regio when it flew by Jupiter in July 1979. Galileo Regio became one of the first major discoveries of Voyager 2 alongside a major ray crater to the south called Osiris. Voyager 1 was not able to photograph Galileo Regio because its fight trajectory brought it to the opposite side of Ganymede.

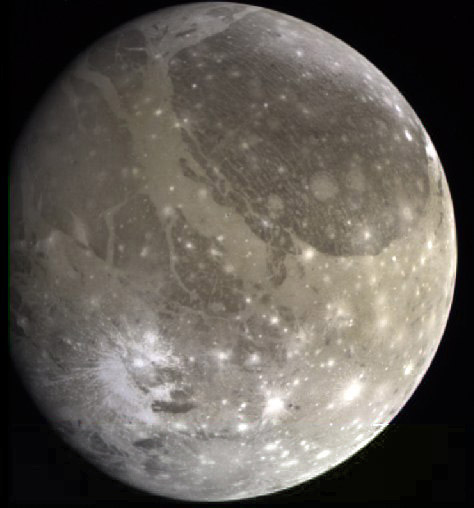
A global image of Ganymede, showing most of Galileo Regio, taken by the Galileo spacecraft in June 1996.

The Galileo space probe then took extremely clear images of Galileo regio, when it flew as low as 750 kilometres (470 mi) from the regio in September 1996. As of 2025, the images sent back by the Galileo spacecraft are the clearest available images of the regio.

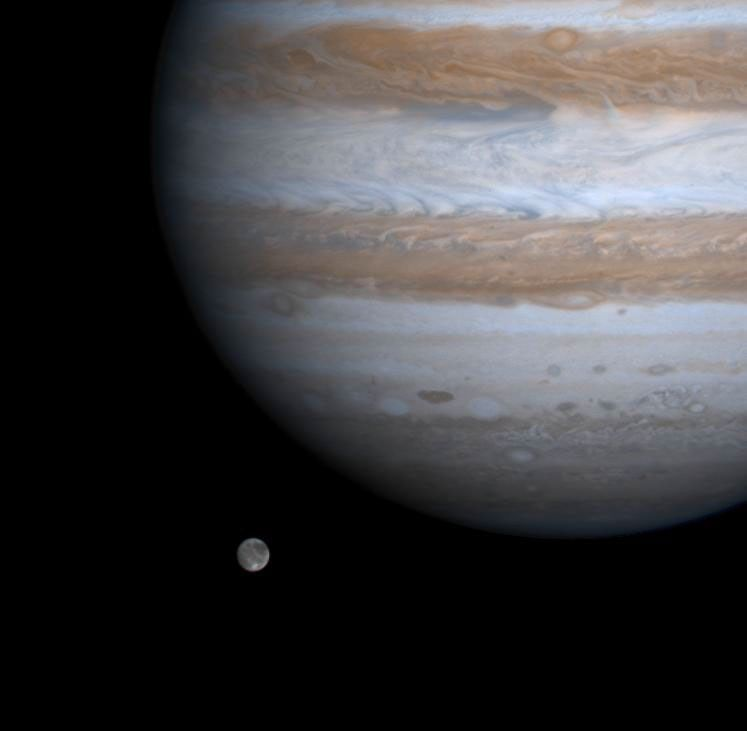
An image of Ganymede and Jupiter, taken by Cassini in December 2000 from a distance of 26,500,000 kilometres (16,500,000 mi) Galileo Regio is on the top right of Ganymede in this image.

The next probe that visited Jupiter, the Cassini spacecraft, was able to photograph the regio during its flyby of the Jovian system.

The regio has also been observed by Earth-based telescopes such as the Hubble Space Telescope. With enough angular resolution, amateur telescopes can also see the regio due to its immense size and very dark shade, which contrasts with its brighter surroundings.

=== Future missions ===
The European Space Agency's (ESA) Jupiter Icy Moons Explorer (Juice) is scheduled to arrive at Jupiter in July 2031. After spending around three and a half years in orbit around Jupiter and performing multiple flybys of Europa, Callisto and Ganymede, Juice will settle into a low orbit around Ganymede at a distance of just 500 kilometres (310 mi). Juice is expected to be able to photograph the ancient, grooved, and heavily cratered terrain of Ganymede with a resolution even higher than that of Galileo.

== Gallery ==
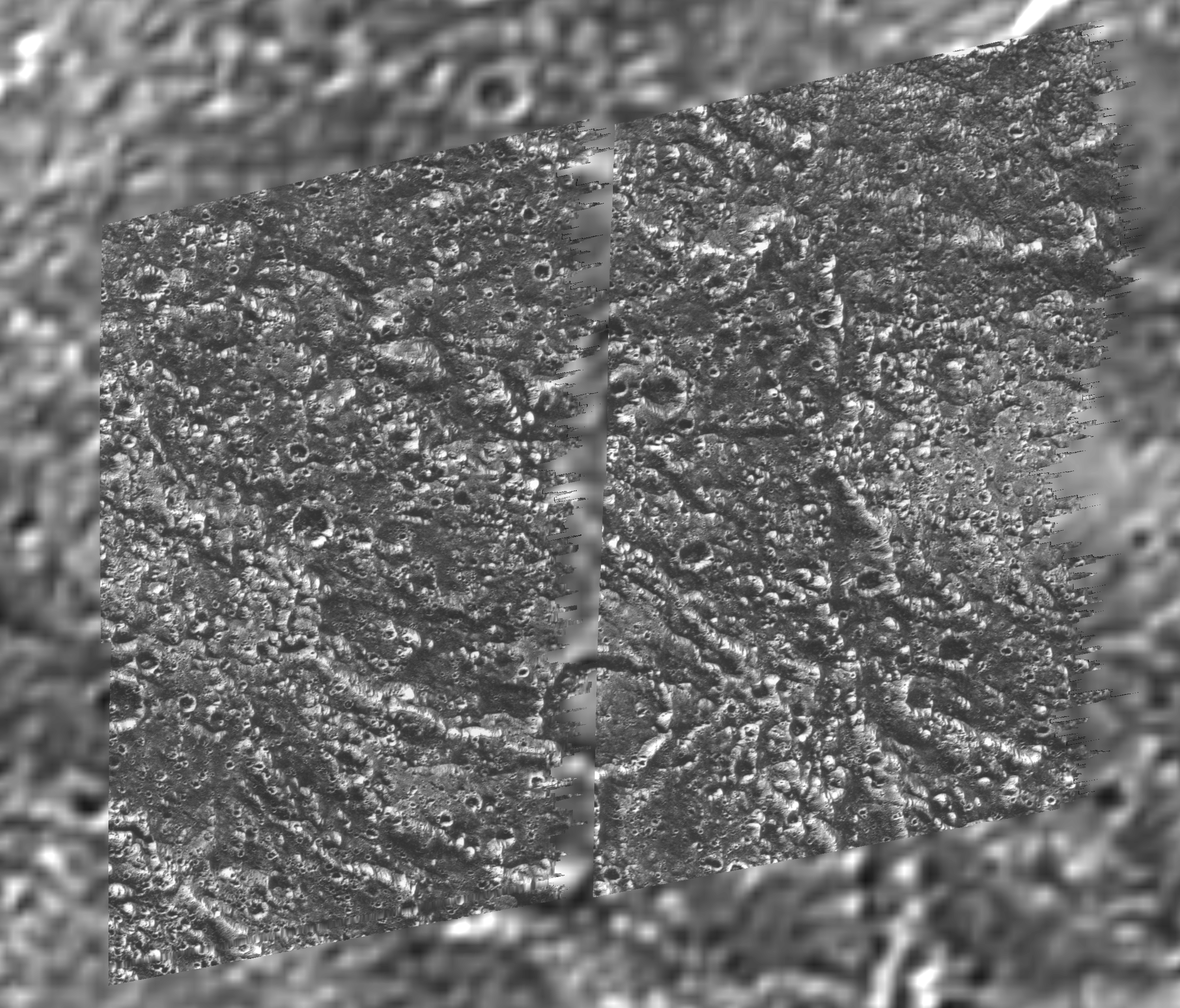
A high resolution image Galileo Regio, clearly showing its ancient terrain composed of old furrows in various stage of degradation. This image was created by overlaying images taken by the Galileo spacecraft in September 1997 onto images taken by Voyager 2 in July 1979.

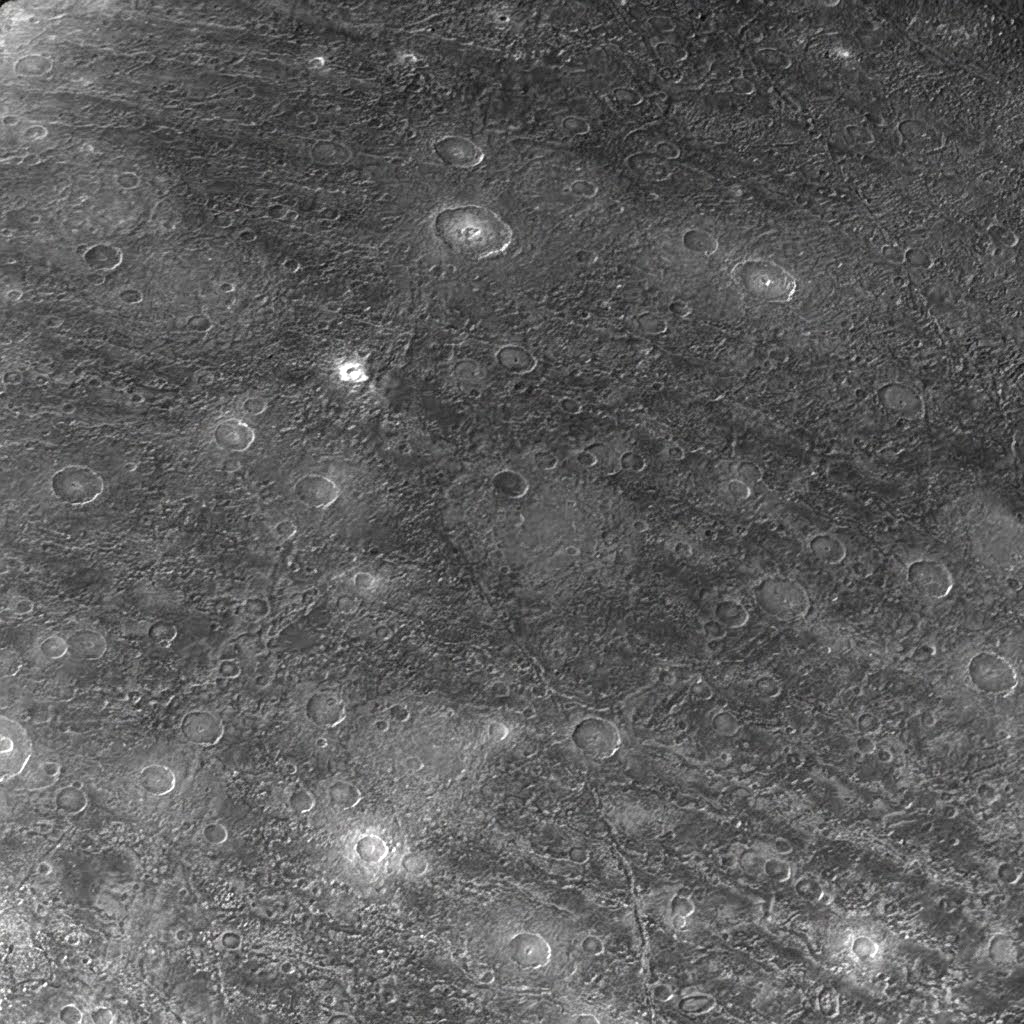
An image of Edfu Facula and Khepri crater that are within Galileo Regio. This photograph was taken by Voyager 2 in July 1979.
